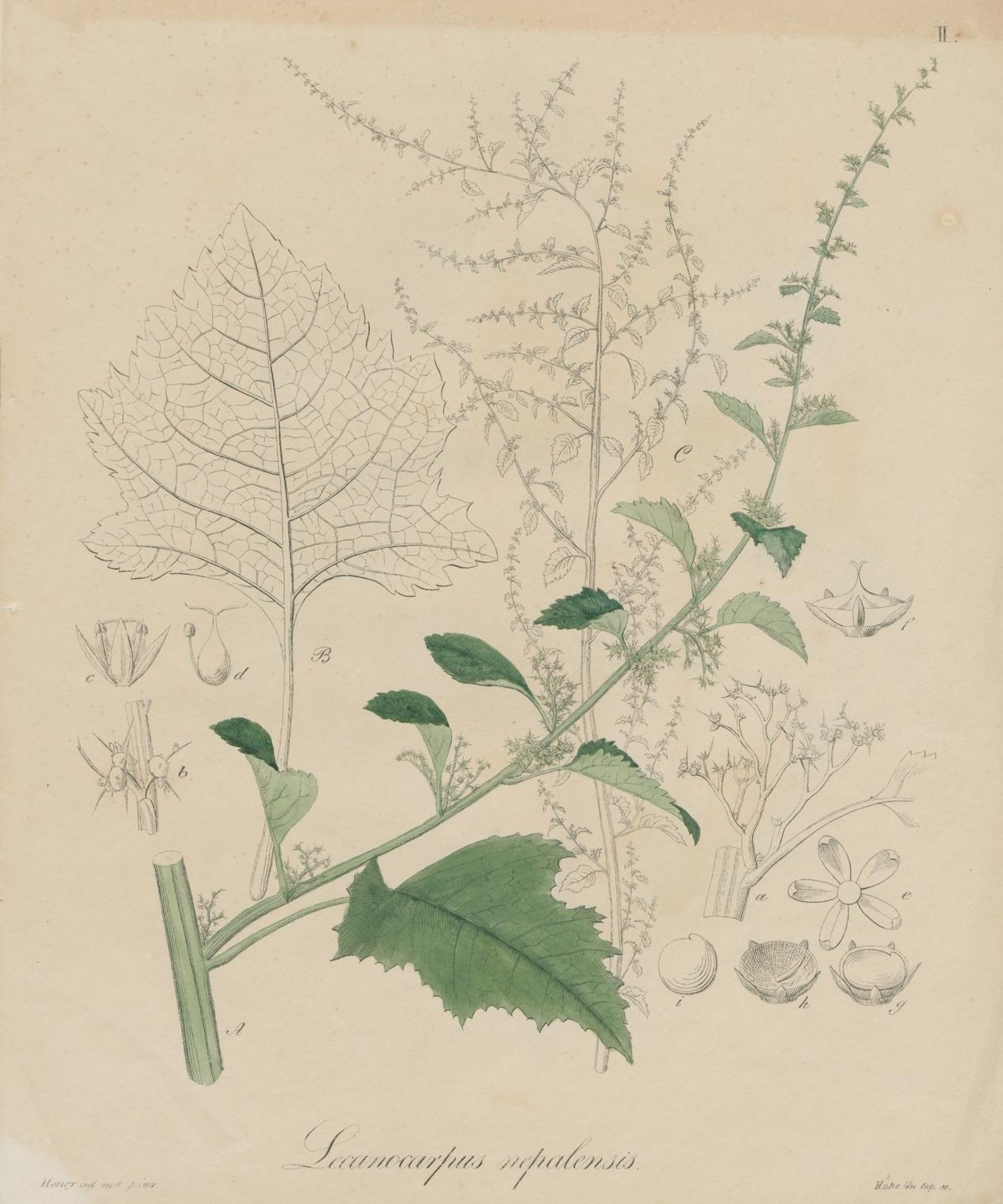
- Botanical illustration of Acroglochin persicarioides

Scientific classification
- Kingdom: Plantae
- Clade: Tracheophytes
- Clade: Angiosperms
- Clade: Eudicots
- Order: Caryophyllales
- Family: Amaranthaceae
- Genus: Acroglochin; Schrad.

Synonyms
- Blitanthus Rchb.; Lecanocarpus Nees

= Acroglochin =

Genus of plants

Acroglochin is a genus of flowering plants in the family Amaranthaceae.

== Taxonomy ==
The genus Acroglochin was first established in 1822 by Heinrich Schrader. Acroglochin was usually classified in subfamily Betoideae, because like all other Betoideae, the fruits are circumscissile capsules. But it proved to be phylogenetically isolated. The relationships are uncertain, it may probably be classified as a subfamily of its own. Molecular research in 2016 provided some evidence for the inclusion in subfamily Corispermoideae.

=== Species ===
As of April 2022, Plants of the World Online accepted three species:

- Acroglochin muliensis (Soong) G.L.Chu
- Acroglochin multiflora (Soong) G.L.Chu
- Acroglochin persicarioides (Poir.) Moq.
