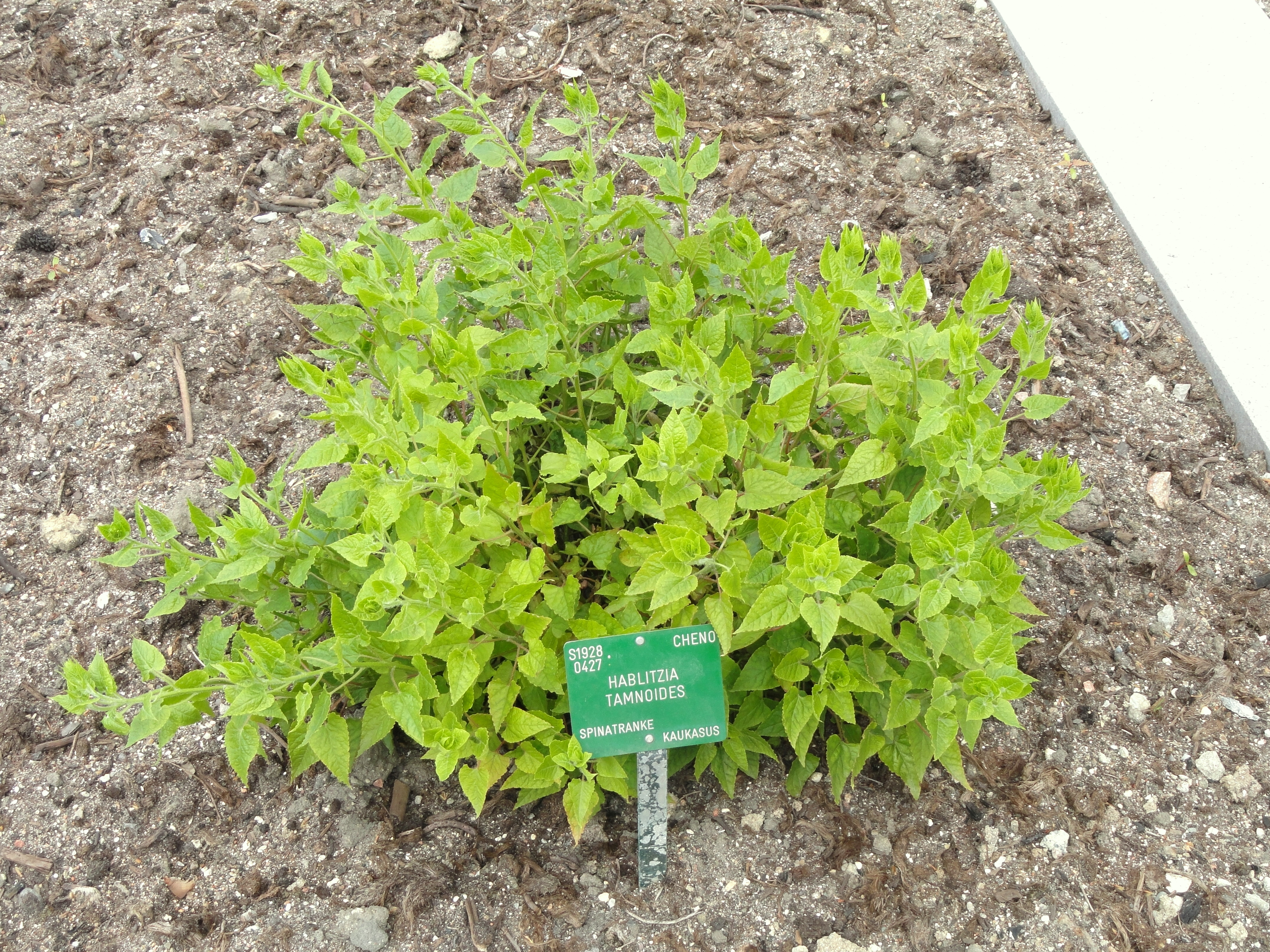

Scientific classification
- Kingdom: Plantae
- Clade: Tracheophytes
- Clade: Angiosperms
- Clade: Eudicots
- Order: Caryophyllales
- Family: Amaranthaceae
- Subfamily: Betoideae
- Tribe: Hablitzieae
- Genus: Hablitzia; M.Bieb. (1817)
- Species: H. tamnoides

Binomial name
- Hablitzia tamnoides M.Bieb. (1817)

= Hablitzia =

Genus of flowering plants

Hablitzia tamnoides, or Caucasian spinach, the sole species in the genus Hablitzia, is an edible herbaceous perennial plant, native to the Caucasus region. It is in the family Amaranthaceae and the subfamily of Betoideae. It is related to the genus Beta, but unlike Beta, it is a vine. It is also likely one of the longest lived plants in its family - one plant growing in Norrtälje, Sweden is reported to be over 50 years old.

== Description ==
=== Leaves and Stems ===
Caucasian spinach has green cordate leaves without serration which taper to a narrow point and sometimes have very soft hairs on them. Hablitzia's leaf-surface is more or less matte, and the veins are arranged around a central axis. The stems are generally green, with noticeable ridges running their length and are sometimes red in color. The leaves are edible, similarly to spinach, which is related. Hablitzia plants can easily grow to a height of around three meters if they have adequate support. However, they lack tendrils, so they climb mostly by twisting their leaf stalks around the structures they grow upon, as many species from the genus Clematis do. Where there is no support, they sprawl horizontally across the ground or cascade down over the edges of the container.

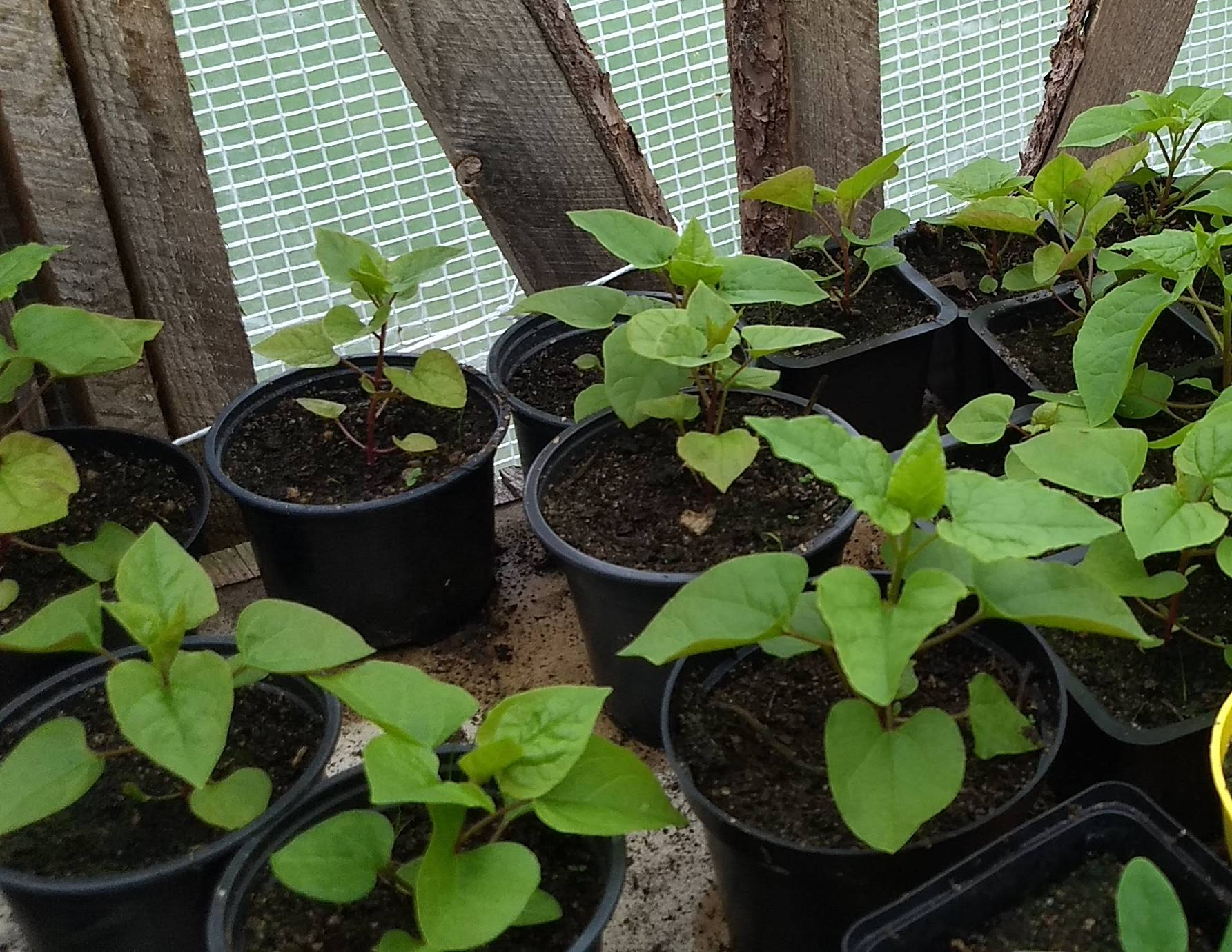
Hablitzia tamnoides seedlings in a greenhouse

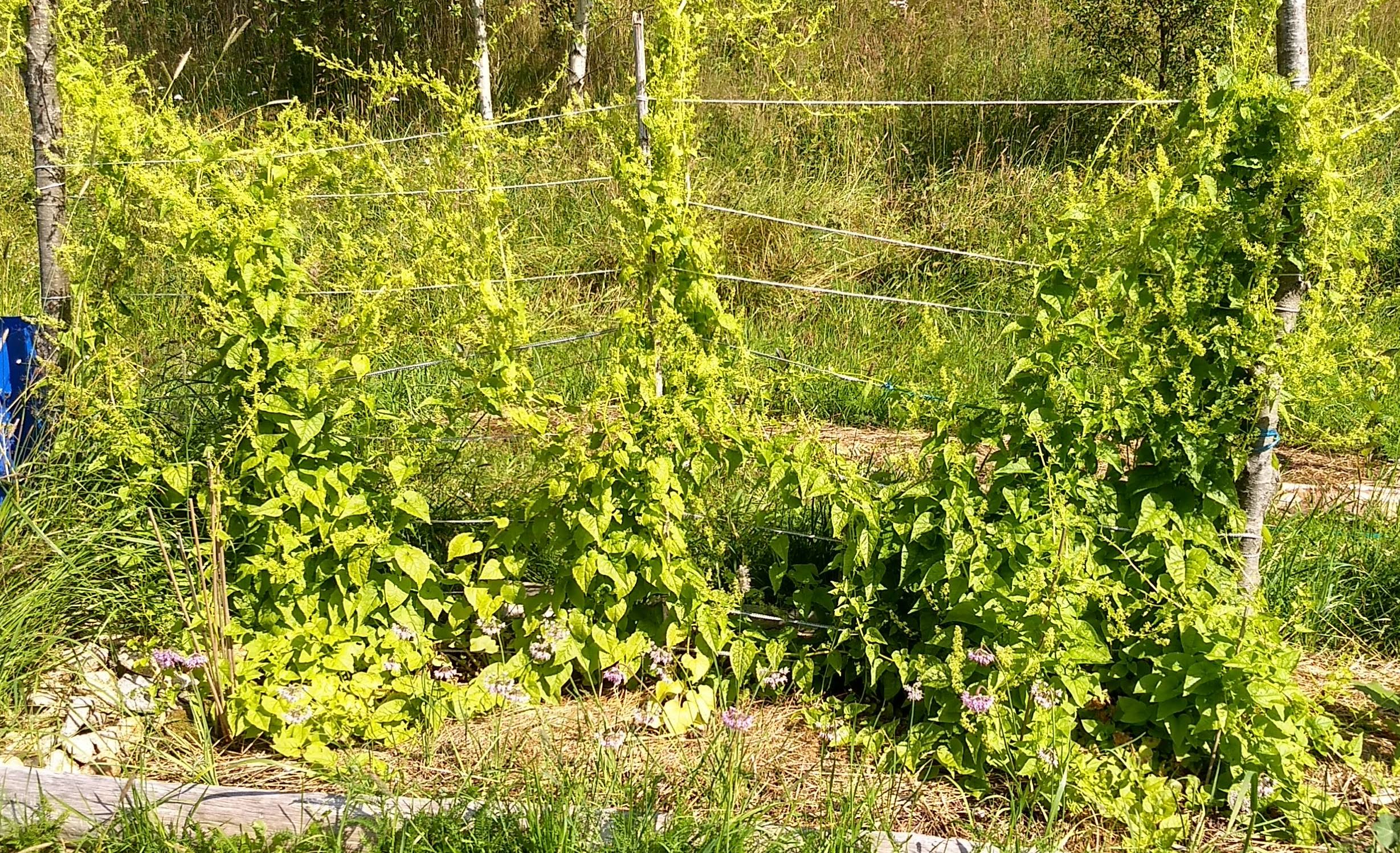
Hablitzia tamnoides plants in flower growing on a trellis

=== Flowers ===
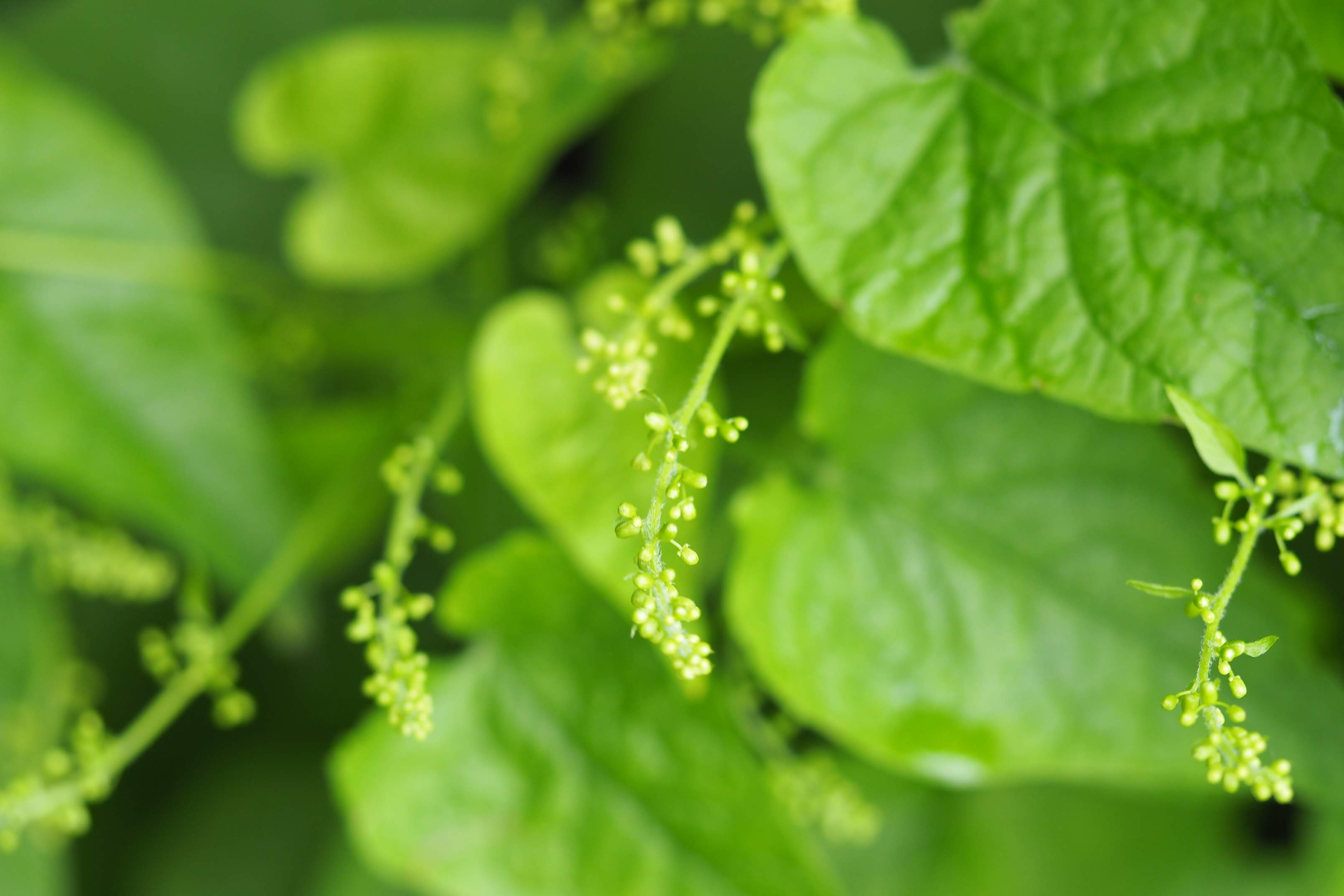
Flower buds from Hablitzia tamnoides

Hablitzia flowers are quite small and white in color. They are shaped like five-pointed stars, a fact which is reflected in the plant's Norwegian name, Stjernemelde, which means Star-report.

They are found profusely in a racemose or paniculate arrangement, typically appearing from late May through July.

The flowers have a notable scent. While individual flowers have a rather faint scent, a Hablitzia with many flowers has a scent almost exactly like crushed Coriander leaf.

=== Seeds ===
Hablitzia produces tiny, glossy black seeds, sometimes in abundance.

=== Roots ===
In autumn, the aboveground parts of the plant die back, but the rest of the plant remains dormant underground. A dormant Hablitzia almost always has its head very close to the surface. Even during winter, at the base of the old stem, a crown of elongated buds or shoots can be found, which usually remain dormant until around February. Around the primary shoots, there are often many secondary buds which can be seen when the soil around the base of the plant is removed. Occasionally, the roots are exposed, which are somewhat like those of sea kale.

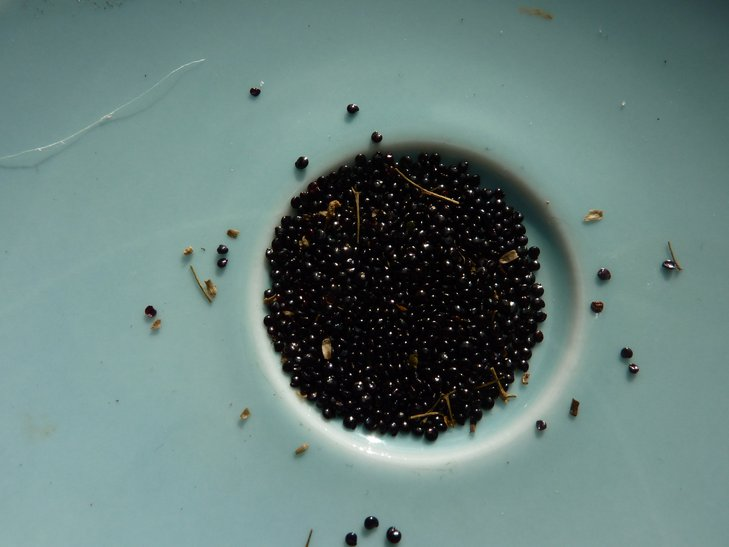
Seeds from Hablitzia tamnoides

=== Native range and growing conditions ===
Hablitzia's native range is the Caucasus. It is most commonly found in dry, deciduous woods and forests, particularly in shady spots and along rivers. Where most Goosefoot family members prefer full sun, Caucasian spinach is one of the few shade-loving species, a fact that is also reflected in its peculiar affinity for caves.

As well as the Caucasus, Hablitzia has also been found in North-Eastern Turkey, as well as in Iran and Greece. There are also relic populations and individual plants scattered across Scandinavia (several in Sweden and Finland and at least one in Norway), a fact that reflects the curious history of Hablitzia.

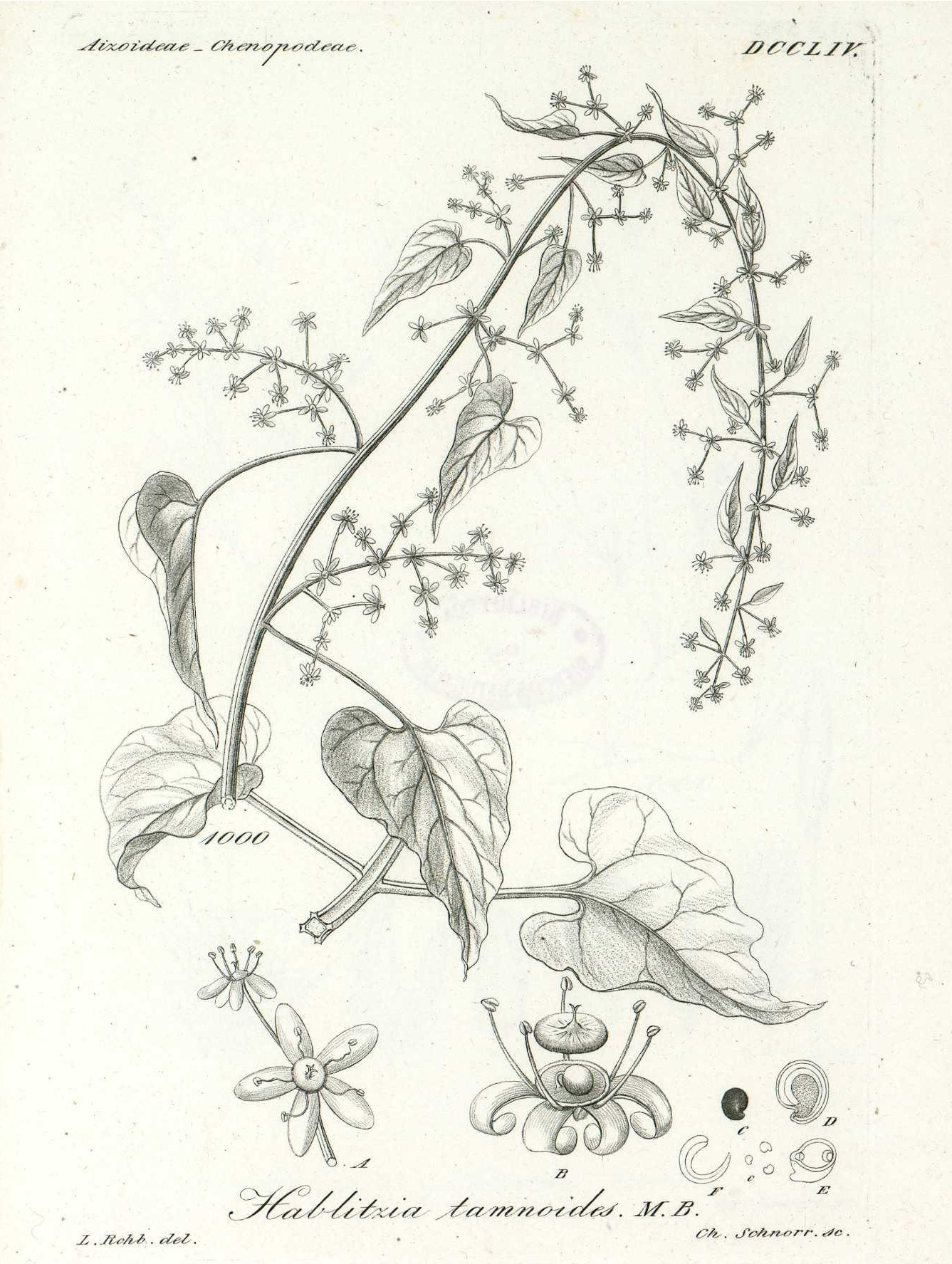
Diagram of plant and flower

== History ==
From its origin in the Caucasus, Hablitzia was moved around starting in the early 1800s. It was grown in the UK, at Kew and Cambridge Botanical Gardens as early as 1828, only 11 years after Bieberstein first described it. It was also grown at Glasgow around 1840. Kew seems to have had these plants until 1931, the last year in which it appears in their Bulletin of Miscellaneous Information. The three British institutions seem to be among the first botanic gardens to grow Hablitzia. References to its cultivation elsewhere start appearing during the second half of the 19th century.

=== Naming ===
Hablitzia was first described and documented for the international scientific community, by Friedrich August Marschall von Bieberstein, in the Memoirs of the Imperial Society of Naturalists of Moscow (t.5). Hablitzia is named after the 18th Century naturalist Carl Ludwig Hablitz.

== Uses ==
=== Culinary ===
Hablitzia leaves can be eaten raw or cooked. The young ones in particular taste good, but even the older ones make for good eating as they do not develop any bitterness once mature. However, the older leaves of plants grown in full sun, are generally better when cooked.

In addition to the leaves, the young shoots, tender vine tips, and emerging flowers can be used as a vegetable raw or cooked. The shoots can be picked as they start into active growth, but are best harvested while still dormant/semi-dormant, as at this stage the undeveloped leaves are still tightly packed, similarly to Asparagus. They can also be blanched a few weeks prior to harvesting, which may make them a little sweeter. However, it is unknown if the seeds or roots are edible.

==== Nutritional information ====
Until fairly recently there has not been nutritional information available for Hablitzia. However, some work has been carried out at the University of Helsinki, Finland by Leena Nurmi. On analysis, Hablitzia leaves were shown to contain high amounts of carotenoids, folates, calcium, magnesium, phosphorus and zinc. Its levels of oxalic acid, nitrate, cadmium and lead were found to be within permissible thresholds.

Other information is summarized by Hegnauer (1964), who reports the presence of the flavonoids Quercetin and Kaempferol, and the polyphenols, Caffeic acid, p-Coumaric acid and Ferulic acid in Hablitzia leaves (p. 413). They also report that the whole plant contains 1% (by dry weight) of the methylamine Betain, (citing Stanek and Domin (1909/1910) on p. 417).

Another noteworthy feature of Hablitzia is that it produces betacyanins, a class of compounds structurally related to alkaloids. Any red colouration seen in the stems and leaves is due to this.

== Cultivation ==
=== Position in the garden ===
Hablitzia can tolerate reasonable amounts of shade. In fact, plants have grown in full sun and partial shade, and the experience is that it shows, as Jules Rudolph wrote back in 1897, 'a marked preference' [un preference marquee] for the latter (p. 329). In particular, it seems to benefit from having its feet in the shade - presumably because this helps the soil to remain cool and retain more water during the hottest parts of the year. The plants themselves grow well enough in full sun but unless they get plenty of water, weeks of glaring summer sunshine eventually impacts on the quality of the leaves and shortens the window within which they are at their prime.

=== Cold hardiness ===
Many of the plants in circulation come via Scandinavia, and are likely very cold-hardy - some survive in Finnmark, in the northernmost part of Norway, are known to withstand temperatures down to -30 (Barstow 2014). In its home in the Caucasus wild populations of Hablitzia occupy a number of habitats, some of these may grow at considerable altitude, and share the hardiness of the Nordic stock, but it is unlikely that they are all this hardy, even if they are relatively so.

=== Soil ===
Caucasian spinach seems to tolerate a range of soils conditions. However, the conditions a plant can tolerate and those under which it flourishes are not necessarily the same, and while there is some truth to John Weather's claim that it ‘flourishes in ordinary garden soil’ (1911, p. 263), that really depends on an individuals assessment of what the soil in a typical garden is like. He, at any rate, seems have regarded Hablitzia as having slightly more specific requirements a decade earlier when, in A Practical Guide to Garden Plants, he writes that it requires ‘a good, rich, loamy soil' (p.765). In agreement with this, a short entry from 1880 in the periodical The Garden attributes the unprecedented vigor of a plant in cultivation at Kew to its 'having been planted two years ago in a deep bed of loam and manure’ (Anon. 1880, p. 79).

==== Drainage ====
Two factors that do seem to be important are drainage and pH. Although Hablitzia likes a good deal to drink when it first commences into growth, it seems to resent wet feet in winter. This seems to be well established as an entry from 1893 in The Gardener's Chronicle, urges readers to 'bear in mind the importance of dryness at the root during the winter' (Anon. 1893. p. 236). In his New Illustrated Encyclopedia of Gardening (1960), Thomas Everett reiterates this: 'stagnant moisture is fatal to the roots in winter' (p. 815).

==== pH ====
As for pH, Hablitzia seems to have a preference for neutral or alkaline soil, which is not entirely surprising given that many members of the Chenopodiaceae thrive on soils with fairly high concentrations of alkali-salts (sodium chloride, sodium carbonate, gypsum). While it seems to do fine on weakly acidic soil (around pH 5), once the universal indicator starts to look like a glass of Chartreuse the soil is pushing up against its limits.

=== Climbing support ===
Although not strictly necessary, most people prefer to provide Caucasian spinach with something to climb up or through. Any large trellis, garden obelisk, bean pole wigwam, or similar should work fine, and a number of older sources suggest using it to cover an arch or pergola. But perhaps the most satisfying way to provide Hablitzia with support is to use a living trellis. Placing it at the base of a tree, particularly a deciduous one, which will have an open canopy early in the year so that the emerging shoots have a little extra light, can work very well. In fact, The Garden recommend Hablitzia be 'placed at the base of a tree, so that the slender stems can cling to the trunk and develop its large head of feathery green blossoms' (Anon. 1881, p. 71). As well as trees, try large bushy shrubs.

=== Pests and diseases ===
Hablitzia is not known to suffer from many pests or diseases, although it is a host plant for a species for tortoise or leaf-mining beetle, Cassida seraphina var. hablitziae, native to Turkey and Kazakhstan. In one study it is reported that plants were successfully inoculated with the leaf spot virus Cercospora beticola.

== Propagation ==
=== From seeds ===
Caucasian spinach is grown from seed or propagated vegetative and both methods are fairly easy for planters. Fresh seeds germinate readily, and they do so more evenly and over a shorter period when sown outside, while temperatures are still relatively cool, e.g. in March and April. In general, no special pre-treatment is used, however some people find that a short period of cold-stratification can help. When Hablitzia seeds are sown, they are scattered onto the surface of a mixture of peat-free compost and sand and cover with a thin layer of horticultural grit.

Planters

Hablitzia flowers are hermaphrodite and plants seems to be self-fertile. However, some plants may be more self-compatible than others, as some seem to find that plants only produce large amounts of seed if there are two or more genetically distinct plants growing close together. Mature Hablitzia's often self-seed freely - although the seedlings are vulnerable to slugs and snails. One question that haven't been answered definitively is how long Hablitzia seeds are likely to remain viable after they mature. However, a post to the Friends of Hablitzia Facebook group, reports success germinating seeds that were stored for around four years in less than ideal conditions.

=== Vegetative propagation ===
When it comes to vegetative propagation of Hablitzia, there are a couple of options. One is to lift and divide established plants, as with other clump-forming perennials. The best time to do this is once the current season's growth has died back or early the following season before they have started into active growth. Cuttings can also be successful. After removing shoots from the base of the plant with a small heal - just after they start into growth in early Spring - and cutting away the lowest leaves, apply a small amount of liquid rooting hormone, and place them in sandy compost, in a cool, sheltered spot out of direct sunlight. Plants started from cuttings tend not to grow very strongly in their first year, but by the end of autumn 5 -10 buds should be visible at the base of plants ready to start into growth the following season. It is unsure whether Hablitzia can be propagated by root cuttings.

First year plants are quite slow growing, and for optimal long-term results it is recommended that they should not be harvested from them heavily until their second year, when plants become much more vigorous.
