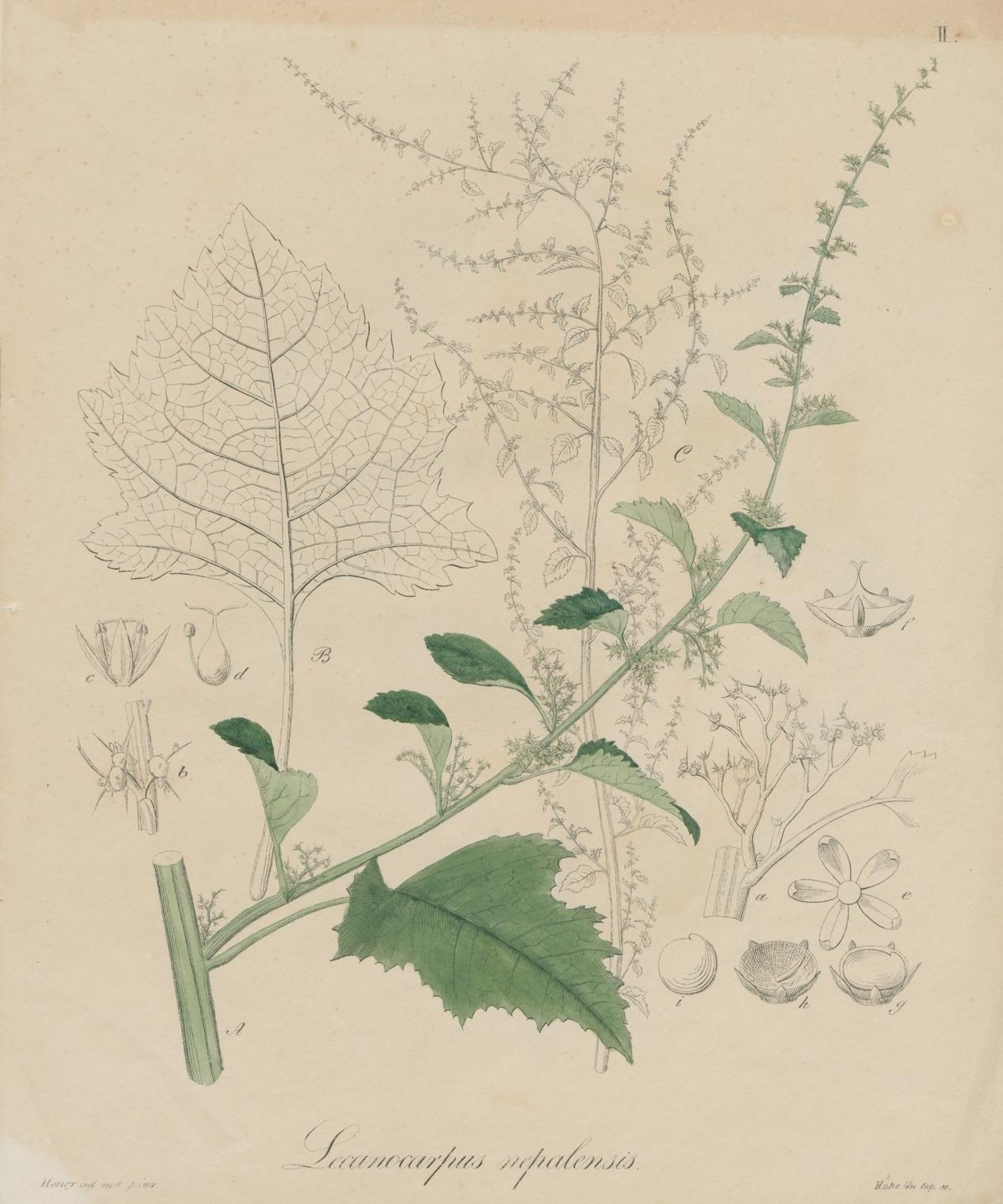

Scientific classification
- Kingdom: Plantae
- Clade: Embryophytes
- Clade: Tracheophytes
- Clade: Angiosperms
- Clade: Eudicots
- Order: Caryophyllales
- Family: Amaranthaceae
- Genus: Acroglochin
- Species: A. persicarioides

Binomial name
- Acroglochin persicarioides (Poir.) Moq.

Synonyms
- See text.

= Acroglochin persicarioides =

Genus of flowering plants

Acroglochin persicarioides is a species of flowering plants in the plant family Amaranthaceae. It is distributed from the Himalayas to China. The systematic position of the genus Acroglochin in subfamily Betoideae is still uncertain.

== Description ==
Acroglochin persicarioides is an erect glabrous annual herb, 30–80 cm tall. The sparsely branched stems are ribbed and striate, green or purplish. The alternate leaves (up to 6 cm long) are long petiolate, their simple leaf blades are ovate to deltoid with irregularly and coarsely toothed margins.

The inflorescences are numerous branched cymes in the axils of almost all leaves, erect-spreading, contracted, with short sterile branches ending needle-like. The hermaphrodite flowers are sessile, without bracts and bracteoles. The perianth is very small and consists of five basally connate tepals, these are linear-oblong, curved upwards, with a green center and membranous margins. There are one to three stamens and an ovary with short style and two short stigmas.

The fruit is slightly shorter than the adpressed persistent perianth, and about 1–4 mm in diameter, it is disciform, depressed and saucer-shaped and opens circumscissile. The fruit wall (pericarp) is free. The horizontal seed is black, with a hard, thin, glossy seed coat. It contains an annular embryo and mealy perisperm (feeding tissue).

The flowering and fruiting phase reaches from July to November.

== Systematics ==
The genus Acroglochin was first established in 1822 by Heinrich Schrader, at the same time describing the single type species, Acroglochin chenopodioides. In the following years, several species of other genera were regarded as identical, especially Amaranthus persicarioides, which was already described in 1810, so that this name has priority. Alfred Moquin-Tandon published the combination Acroglochin persicarioides in 1849 as the accepted name for this species.

Synonyms of Acroglochin persicarioides are:

- Acroglochin chenopodioides Schrad. ex J.A. Schultes
- Acroglochin persicarioides var. muliensis T.P. Soong
- Acroglochin persicarioides var. multiflora T P. Soong
- Acroglochin obtusifolia C.H.Blom
- Acroglochin schraderiana Schult.f. ex Moq.
- Amaranthus acroglochin Spreng.
- Amaranthus diandrus Spreng.
- Amaranthus cauliflorus Link
- Amaranthus persicarioides Poir.
- Blitanthus nepalensis Rchb.
- Boehmeria amaranthus H.Lév.
- Lecanocarpus cauliflorus (Link) Nees, T. Nees & Sinning
- Lecanocarpus nepalensis Nees

== Distribution and habitat ==
Acroglochin persicarioides is distributed from the Himalayas (northern parts of Pakistan and India), Kashmir, Nepal, Bhutan, and Tibet to China (Gansu, Guizhou, Hubei, S Hunan, Shaanxi, Sichuan, Yunnan)

The plants grow in disturbed vegetation among rocks, on waste grounds, near cultivations, at forest margins, riversides, open hillsides, or at roadsides.
