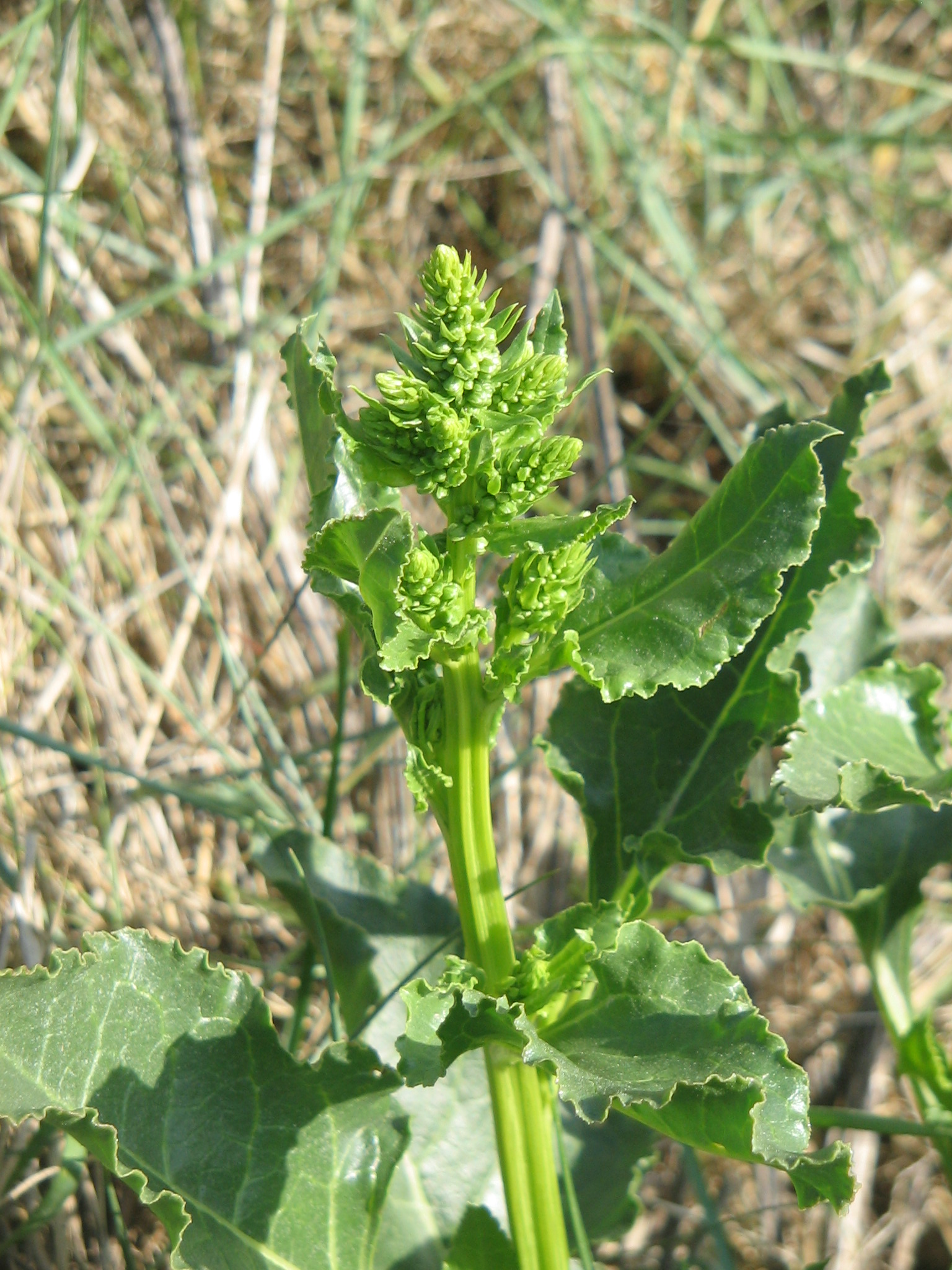
- Beta vulgaris subsp. maritima

Scientific classification
- Kingdom: Plantae
- Clade: Tracheophytes
- Clade: Angiosperms
- Clade: Eudicots
- Order: Caryophyllales
- Family: Amaranthaceae
- Subfamily: Betoideae; Ulbr.

Genera
- about 6 genera, see text

= Betoideae =

Subfamily of flowering plants

The Betoideae are a small subfamily of the flowering plant amaranth family, Amaranthaceae sensu lato (or in Chenopodiaceae sensu stricto). Commonly known members include beet, sugar beet, chard, and mangelwurzel, which all are cultivars of Beta vulgaris.

== Description ==
The species of Betoideae are annuals, biennial or perennial herbs, vines (Hablitzia) or subshrubs. The flowers have 5 tepals (Aphanisma only 3) and 5 stamens (Aphanisma only one). The fruits of Betoideae are capsules that open with a circumscissile lid.

In tribe Beteae, the perianth is basally indurated in fruit, and the stamens a basally inserted to a thickened bulge surrounding the visible part of the ovary. In tribe Hablitzieae, the tepals are not modified in fruit and membranous, and the stamens are basally united in a membranous ring.

== Distribution and habitat ==
Most genera are distributed in Western and Southern Europe, in the Mediterranean and Southwest Asia, but one disjunct genus, Aphanisma, lives at the coasts of California.

The species of Betoideae are adapted to different ecological habitats, several growing in coastal habitats, some on rocks and in mountains, one in deciduous forests (Hablitzia).

== Systematics ==
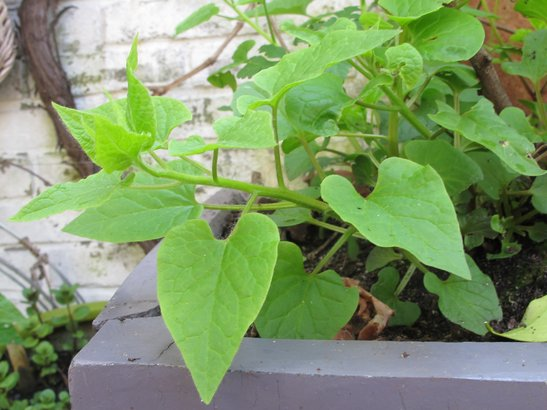
Hablitzia tamnoides

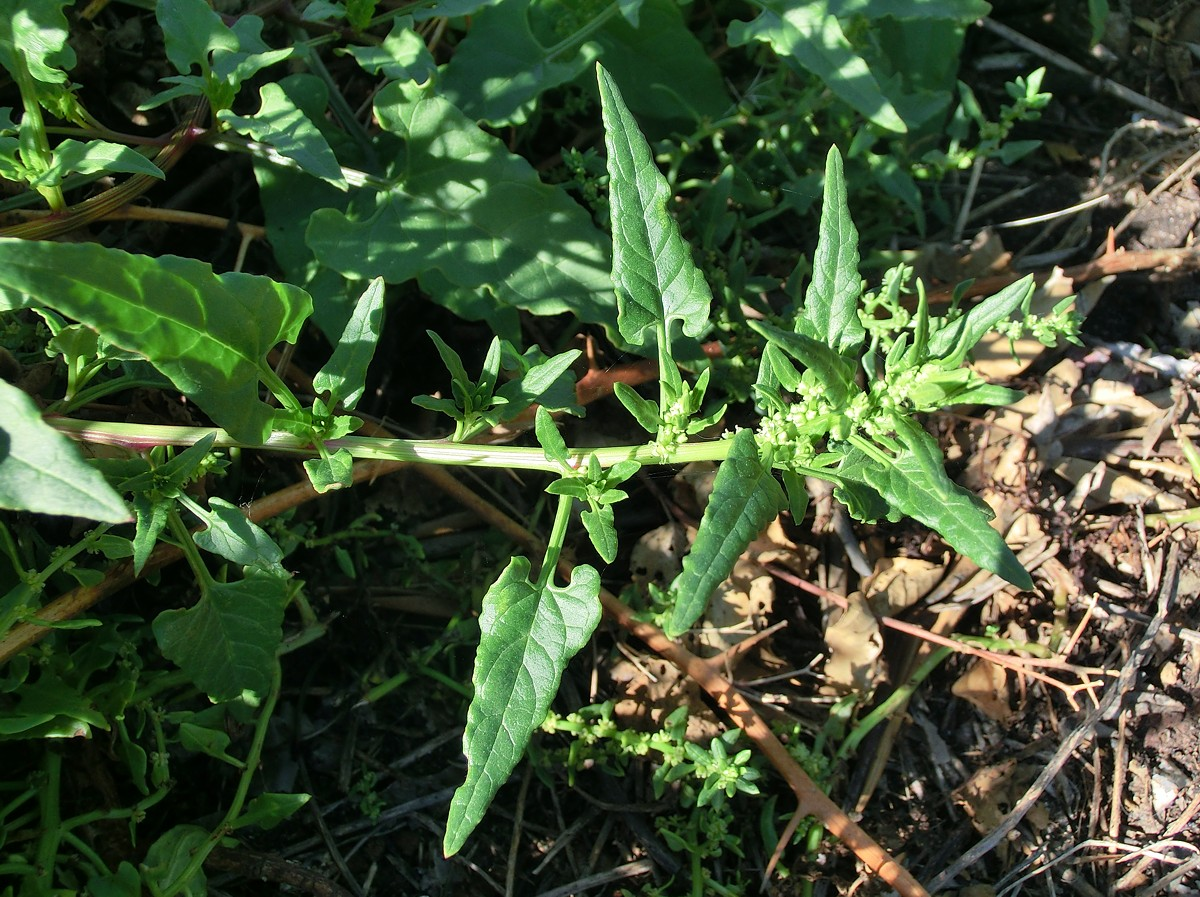
Patellifolia procumbens

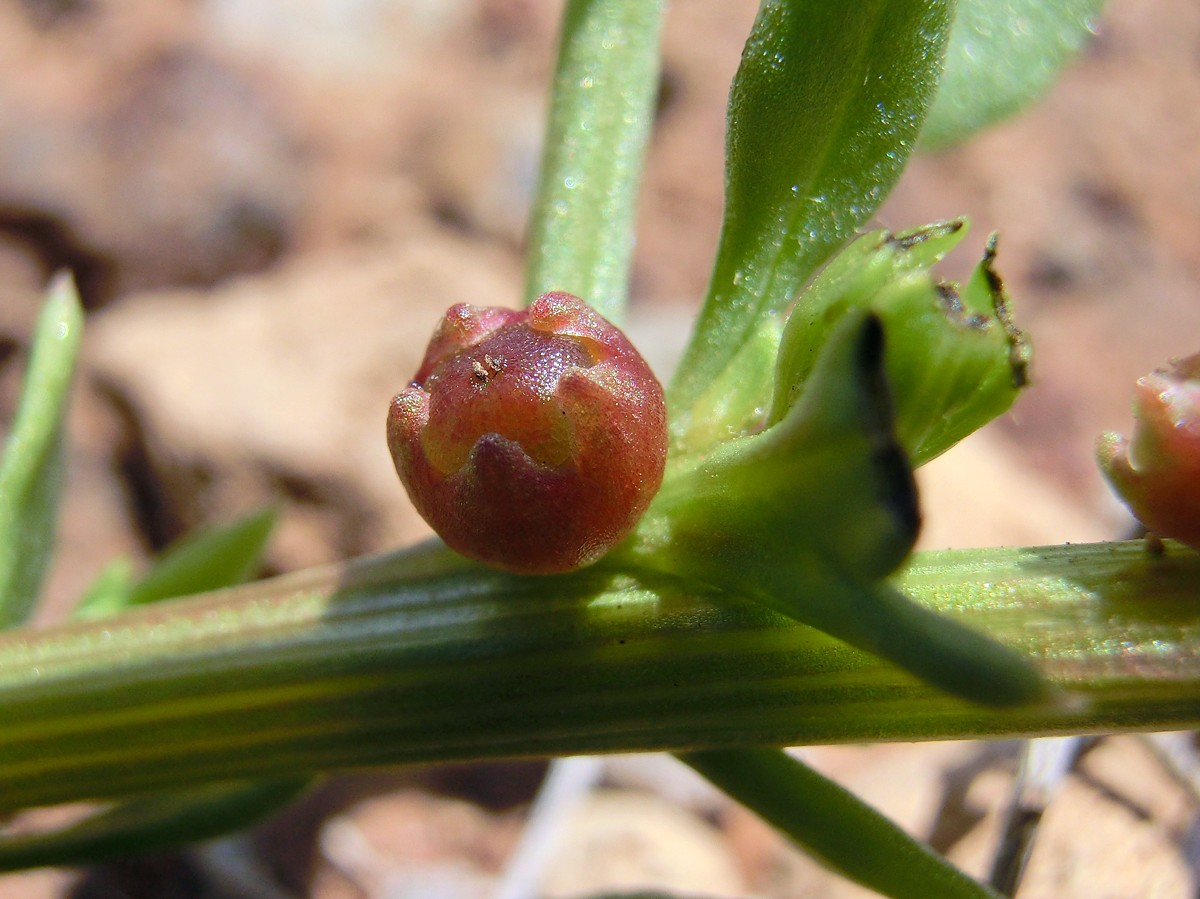
young fruit of Patellifolia patellaris

Oskar Eberhard Ulbrich described the subfamily Betoideae in 1934 within the plant family Chenopodiaceae. He subdivided the taxon into two tribes, Hablitzieae and Beteae, the latter with only one genus, Beta. Phylogenetic research by Kadereit et al. (2006) confirmed this classification, whereas Romeira et al. (2016) suggest only one tribe.

The subfamily is now classified either in family Amaranthaceae sensu lato, or in Chenopodiaceae sensu stricto, (excluding the subfamily Polycnemoideae, as the other subfamilies of Chenopodiaceae, Betoideae, Camphorosmoideae, Chenopodioideae, Corispermoideae, Salicornioideae, Salsoloideae, and Suaedoideae, form a monophyletic group which is distinct from the Amaranthaceae s. str.). Current taxonomic treatments and morphological, physiological and phylogenetic studies seem to prefer Chenopodiaceae s. str. for reasons of taxonomic stability.

The subfamily comprises five genera with about 13-20 species.

- Tribus Beteae Moq.:
  - Beta L., about 7-12 species in West-Europe, Mediterranean, Southwest-Asia, with the important crops Sugar beet, Chard, Beetroot, Mangelwurzel
- Tribus Hablitzieae Ulbr.:
  - Aphanisma Nutt. ex Moq., with one species:
    - Aphanisma blitoides Nutt. ex Moq., an annual plant on Californian beaches
  - Hablitzia M.Bieb., with one species
    - Hablitzia tamnoides M.Bieb., a vine in the forests of the Caucasian floristic region
  - Oreobliton Durieu, with one species
    - Oreobliton thesioides Durieu & Moq., a subshrub in North-Africa, growing on chalk rocks in the Atlas mountains
  - Patellifolia A.J.Scott, Ford-Lloyd & J.T. Williams (Syn. Beta sect. Procumbentes Moq.), was confirmed as a different genus. These are perennial procumbent herbs, with 3 species growing in coastal vegetation in Southern-Western Europe, with its center of diversity in the Macaronesian archipelagos:
    - Patellifolia patellaris (Moq.) A.J. Scott & al. (Syn. Beta patellaris Moq.), on Canary Islands and in the western Mediterranean (Spain, Balearic islands, Sicily, Marocco)
    - Patellifolia procumbens (Chr. Sm.) A.J. Scott & al. (Syn. Beta procumbentes Chr. Sm.), on Canary Islands
    - Patellifolia webbiana (Moq.) A.J. Scott & al. (Syn. Beta webbiana Moq.), on Canary Islands
- Classification not sure: phylogenetically isolated, formerly included in Betoideae but to be excluded, maybe to be classified as a subfamily of its own. Recent molecular research provides some evidence for the inclusion in subfamily Corispermoideae:
  - Acroglochin Schrad. ex Schult., with one species
    - Acroglochin persicarioides (Poiret) Moq.

=== Phylogenetics ===
The subfamily Betoideae is regarded as a monophyletic taxon, if Acroglochin is excluded. The age of the subfamily seems to be relatively old, originating during the Early Oligocene Glacial Maximum, estimated 48.6-35.4 million years ago They early diversified into genera about 32.5 million years ago. The extant genera show narrow distributions in distant geographic regions, which may have resulted from speciation by isolation and following extinction events. The areals of Aphanisma in California and Oreobliton in North-Africa are interpreted as remnants from a Beringian ancestor, the disjunction circa 15.4-9.2 million years ago.

The differentiation between Beta and Patellifolia probably occurred early in the Late Oligocene. Both lineages tolerate aridity and highly saline soils, so they were able to survive dramatic aridity events in the past that led to the extinction of other more vulnerable lineages in the subfamily.

== Uses ==
Beet (Beta vulgaris) has an immense economic importance as sugar crop (sugar beet), and a great importance as a vegetable (chard, beetroot), and as fodder plant (mangelwurzel). This species is also used as medicinal plant, ornamental plant, dye and as renewable resource. It is the crop species with the highest economic value in the order Caryophyllales. Therefore, the other members of Betoideae, especially Beta and Patellifolia, are interesting as crop wild relatives.
