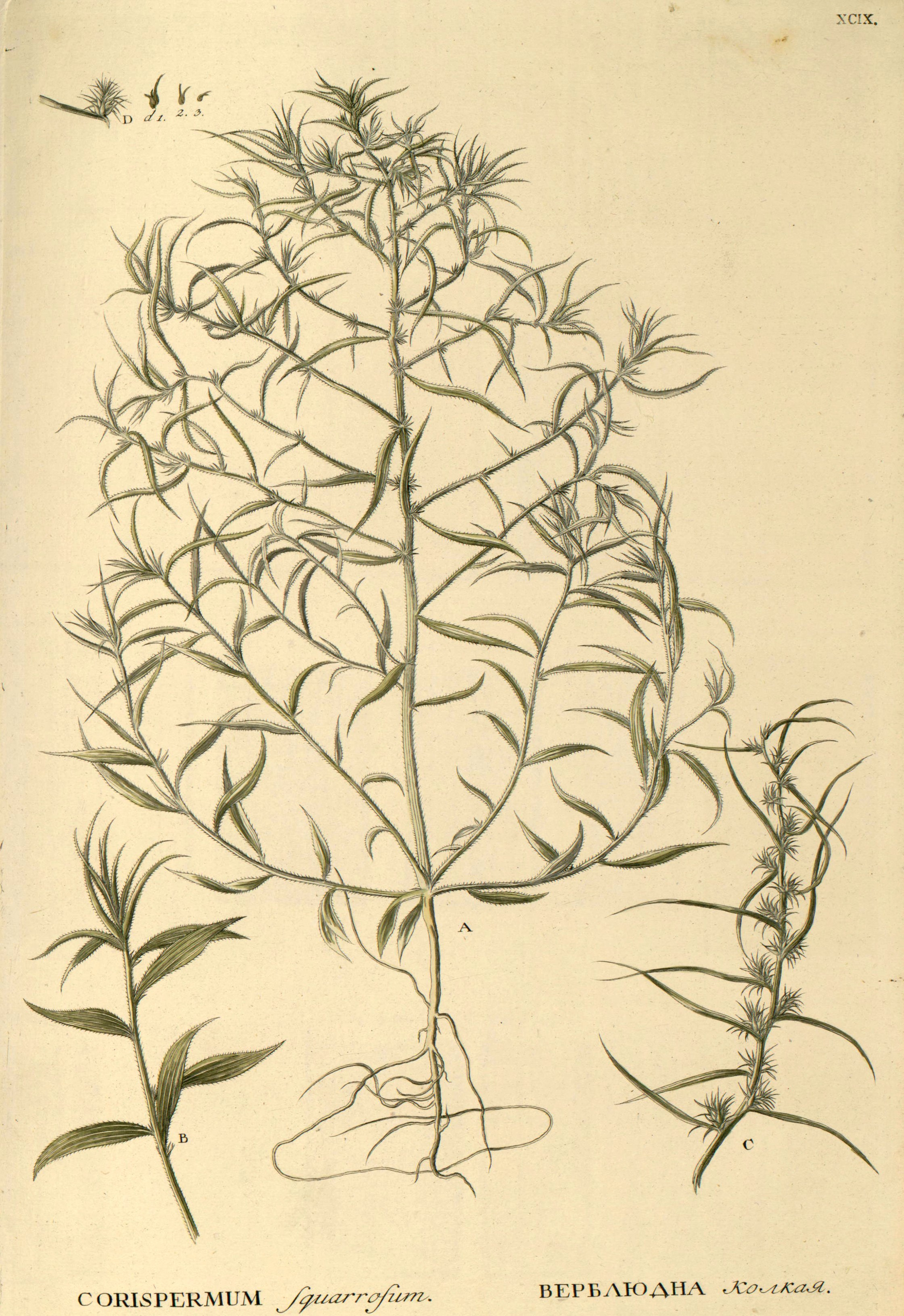
- Agriophyllum squarrosum as Corispermum squarrosum

Scientific classification
- Kingdom: Plantae
- Clade: Embryophytes
- Clade: Tracheophytes
- Clade: Angiosperms
- Clade: Eudicots
- Order: Caryophyllales
- Family: Amaranthaceae
- Subfamily: Corispermoideae
- Genus: Agriophyllum; M.Bieb.

Species
- See text

= Agriophyllum =

Genus of flowering plants

Agriophyllum is a genus of flowering plants of the family Amaranthaceae, native to arid regions of Asia with a few occurrences in Eastern Europe. Reaching at most 1 m, they are valuable as fodder and for wind‑blown soil capture.

In Kazakhstan, it is known as "kumarshyk". Scientists from the Atyrau Region patented a drink combining kumarshyk with camel's milk that's undergone lactic acid fermentation. In 2021, author Murat Bektenov, who is from the Ryn Desert region, published a book named after the plant. The book outlines how kumarshyk was used for sustenance by Kazakhs during times of war and famine. Like wheat, kumarshyk seeds can be roasted, milled, baked, or even made into porridge.

== Species ==
Species currently accepted by The Plant List are as follows:

- Agriophyllum lateriflorum (Lam.) Moq.
- Agriophyllum latifolium Fisch. & C.A.Mey.
- Agriophyllum minus Fisch. & C.A.Mey.
- Agriophyllum montasirii El Gazzar
- Agriophyllum paletzkianum Litv.
- Agriophyllum squarrosum (L.) Moq.
