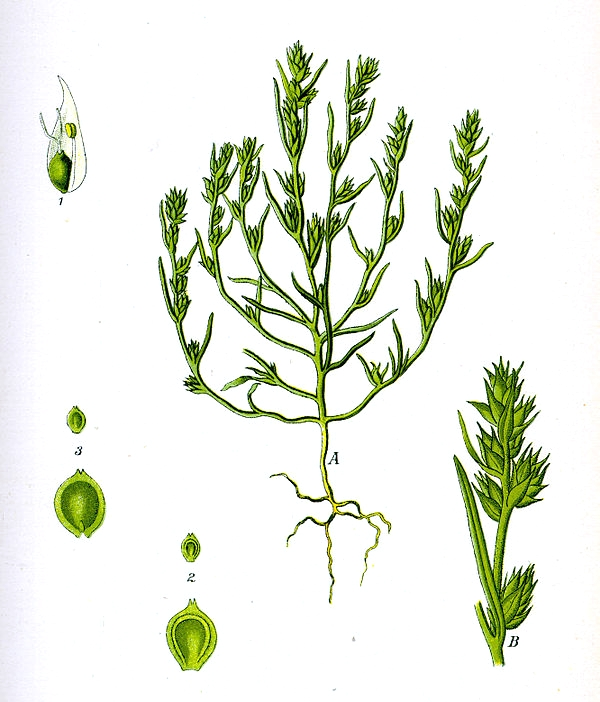
- Corispermum intermedium

Scientific classification
- Kingdom: Plantae
- Clade: Tracheophytes
- Clade: Angiosperms
- Clade: Eudicots
- Order: Caryophyllales
- Family: Amaranthaceae
- Subfamily: Corispermoideae
- Genus: Corispermum; L.

Species
- 60-65: See text

= Corispermum =

Genus of flowering plants

Corispermum is a genus of plants in the family Amaranthaceae. Common names given to members of the genus involve bugseed, tickseed, and tumbleweed. In general, these are erect annual plants with flat, thin leaves and topped with inflorescences of flowers with long bracts. Bugseeds are native to North America and Eurasia, but little is known about their taxonomy and distribution.

== Species ==
The following species are recognised in the genus Corispermum:

- Corispermum afghanicum Podlech
- Corispermum algidum Iljin
- Corispermum altaicum Iljin
- Corispermum americanum (Nutt.) Nutt. - American bugseed
- Corispermum anatolicum Sukhor.
- Corispermum aralocaspicum Iljin
- Corispermum bardunovii Popov ex Lomon.
- Corispermum × calvoborysthenicum Klokov
- Corispermum candelabrum Iljin
- Corispermum canescens Kit. ex Schult.
- Corispermum chinganicum Iljin
- Corispermum confertum Bunge ex Maxim.
- Corispermum crassifolium Turcz.
- Corispermum × czernjaevii Klokov
- Corispermum declinatum Stephan ex Iljin
- Corispermum dilutum (Kitag.) C.P.Tsien & C.G.Ma
- Corispermum dutreuilii Iljin
- Corispermum ellipsocarpum (C.P.Tsien & C.G.Ma) Sukhor. & M.Zhang
- Corispermum elongatum Bunge ex Maxim.
- Corispermum erosum Iliin
- Corispermum falcatum Iljin
- Corispermum filifolium C.A.Mey.
- Corispermum flexuosum W.Wang & Fuh
- Corispermum gallicum Iljin
- Corispermum gelidum Iljin
- Corispermum heptapotamicum Iljin
- Corispermum hilariae Iljin
- Corispermum hookeri Mosyakin
- Corispermum huanghoense C.P.Tsien & C.G.Ma
- Corispermum hyssopifolium L. - tumbleweed, this species forms a tumbleweed
- Corispermum iljinii Sukhor. & M.Zhang
- Corispermum intermedium Schweigg.
- Corispermum × klokovii Mosyakin
- Corispermum komarovii Iljin
- Corispermum korovinii Iljin
- Corispermum krylovii Iljin
- Corispermum laxiflorum Schrenk
- Corispermum lehmannianum Bunge
- Corispermum lepidocarpum Grubov
- Corispermum lhasaense C.P.Tsien & C.G.Ma
- Corispermum macrocarpum Bunge ex Maxim.
- Corispermum marschallii Steven
- Corispermum maynense Ignatov
- Corispermum mongolicum Iliin
- Corispermum nanum Sukhor. & M.Zhang
- Corispermum navicula Mosyakin
- Corispermum nitidum Kit. ex Schult.
- Corispermum ochotense Ignatov - Russian bugseed
- Corispermum pacificum Mosyakin
- Corispermum pallasii Steven - Siberian bugseed
- Corispermum pallidum Mosyakin
- Corispermum pamiricum Iljin
- Corispermum papillosum (Kuntze) Iljin
- Corispermum patelliforme Iljin
- Corispermum piliferum Iljin
- Corispermum platypterum Kitag.
- Corispermum praecox C.P.Tsien & C.G.Ma
- Corispermum pseudofalcatum C.P.Tsien & C.G.Ma
- Corispermum puberulum Iljin
- Corispermum rechingeri Sukhor.
- Corispermum redowskii Roem. & Schult.
- Corispermum retortum W.Wang & P.Y.Fu
- Corispermum sibiricum Iljin
- Corispermum squarrosum L.
- Corispermum stauntonii Moq.
- Corispermum stenolepis Kitag.
- Corispermum subpentandrum Pall.
- Corispermum tibeticum Iljin
- Corispermum tylocarpum Hance
- Corispermum ulopterum Fenzl ex Ledeb.
- Corispermum villosum Rydb.
- Corispermum welshii Mosyakin
