= Beta lomatogona =

Scientific classification
- Kingdom: Plantae
- Clade: Embryophytes
- Clade: Tracheophytes
- Clade: Angiosperms
- Clade: Eudicots
- Order: Caryophyllales
- Family: Amaranthaceae
- Genus: Beta
- Species: B. lomatogona

Binomial name
- Beta lomatogona Fisch. & C.A.Mey.

Synonyms
- Beta longespicata Moq.

Species of flowering plant

Beta lomatogona is a species of wild beet in the family Amaranthaceae, native to Cyprus, Turkey, the Transcaucasus, and Iran. A diploid, it is being studied for its cold and drought resistance in an effort to improve the sugar beet.
