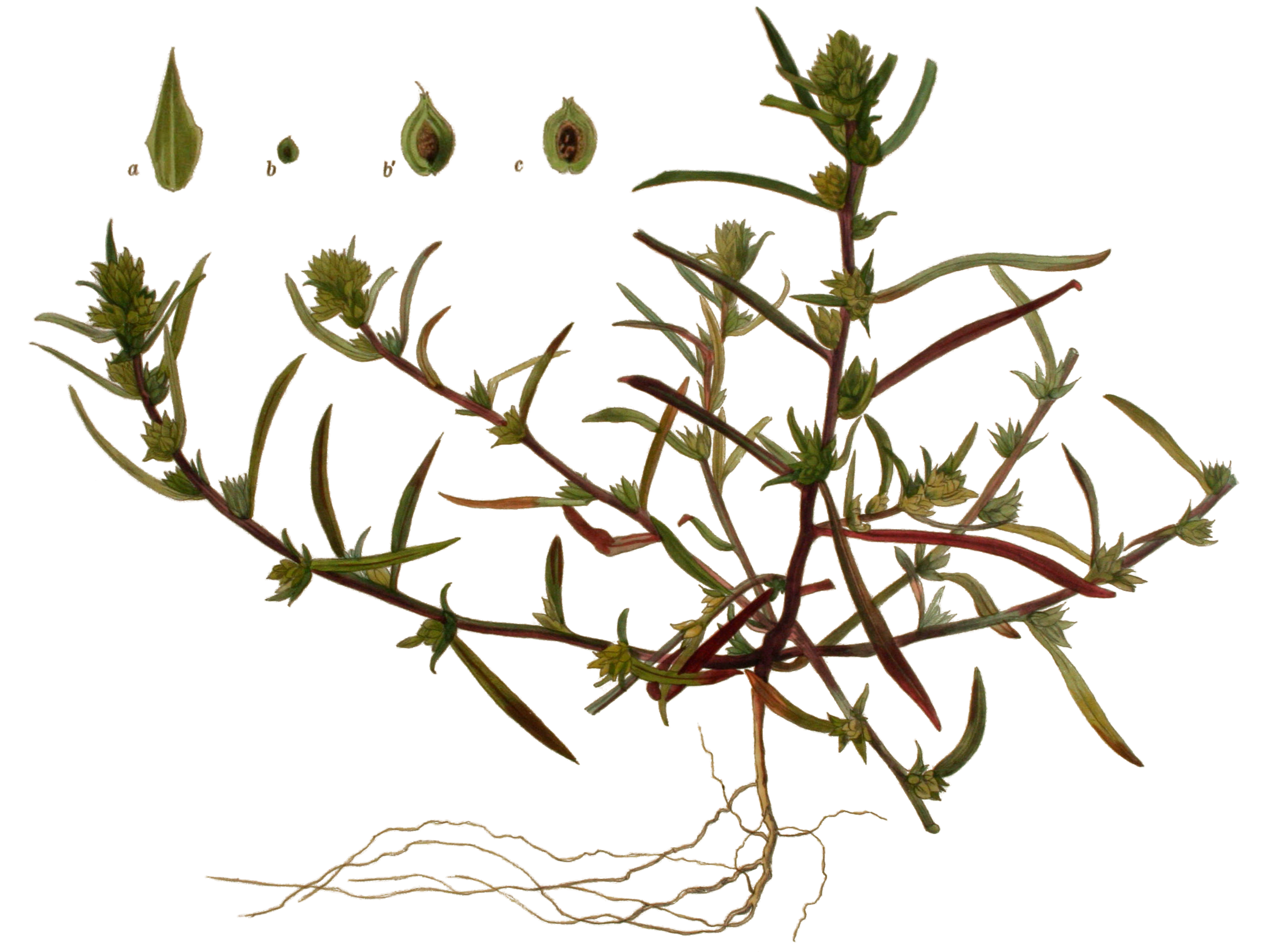
- Corispermum hyssopifolium, as illustrated in Flora Batava by Jan Kops

Scientific classification
- Kingdom: Plantae
- Clade: Tracheophytes
- Clade: Angiosperms
- Clade: Eudicots
- Order: Caryophyllales
- Family: Amaranthaceae
- Genus: Corispermum
- Species: C. hyssopifolium

Binomial name
- Corispermum hyssopifolium L.

= Corispermum hyssopifolium =

Species of flowering plant

Corispermum hyssopifolium is a species in the genus Corispermum of the family Amaranthaceae. It is found in dunes and sandy spots along rivers in central and western Europe, and in western North America where it was exploited for its edible seeds prehistorically. An annual plant, it is between 10 and 60 centimeters (3.9–26.3 inches) high. It blooms in July and August. The fruits have narrow wings, of which the nontransparent edge becomes wider at the top, and on which spikes are mounted on a broad base each. The transparent half of the edge is narrow. The top stipules are ovate, with a peaked top.
