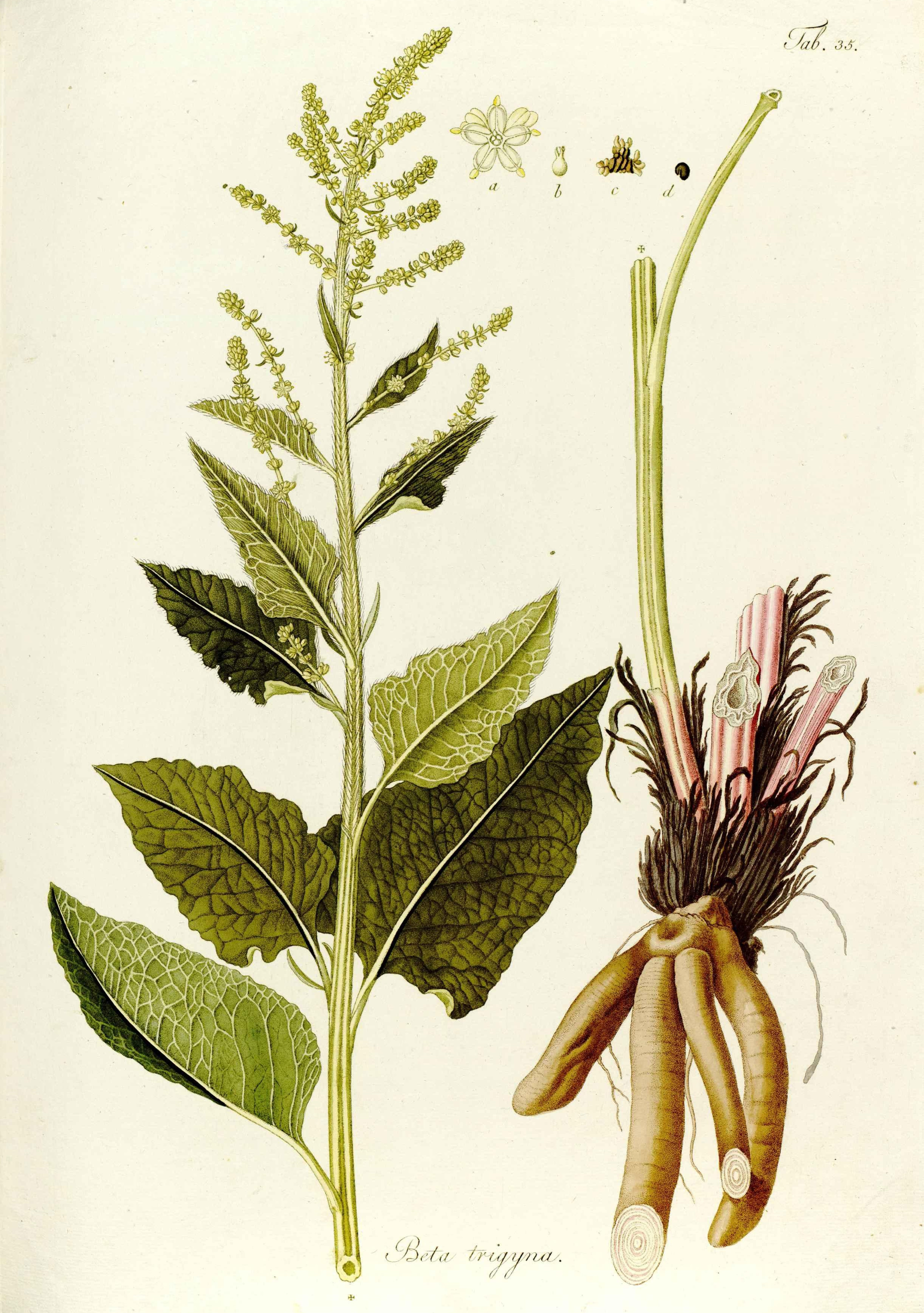
- Beta trigyna botanical illustration

Scientific classification
- Kingdom: Plantae
- Clade: Embryophytes
- Clade: Tracheophytes
- Clade: Angiosperms
- Clade: Eudicots
- Order: Caryophyllales
- Family: Amaranthaceae
- Genus: Beta
- Species: B. trigyna

Binomial name
- Beta trigyna Waldst. & Kit.

Synonyms
- Beta cicla Georgi; Beta cycla Pall.

= Beta trigyna =

Species of flowering plant

Beta trigyna, called the Caucasian wild beet and the Turkish wild beet, is a species of Beta native to Bulgaria, Iran, Romania, the Transcaucasus, Turkey (including the European portion), Turkmenistan, Ukraine (including Crimea), and the former Yugoslavia, and occurring in waste places elsewhere in Europe. It is a hexaploid (2n=54) that usually reproduces by apomixis.
