= Beta nana =

Conservation status
- Vulnerable (IUCN 3.1)

Scientific classification
- Kingdom: Plantae
- Clade: Tracheophytes
- Clade: Angiosperms
- Clade: Eudicots
- Order: Caryophyllales
- Family: Amaranthaceae
- Genus: Beta
- Species: B. nana

Binomial name
- Beta nana Boiss. & Heldr.

Species of flowering plant

Beta nana, the dwarf beet, is a species of flowering perennial plant in the family Amaranthaceae endemic to the mountains of central and southern Greece.

== Description ==
B. nana is a small, diploid perennial plant with a prostrate growth habit and a rosette of leaves 10–20 cm in diameter, depending on the fertility of the soil. The inflorescences are procumbent, meaning they lie flat on the ground, and they hold 10–25 flowers each. The inflorescence is covered in small orbicular bracts, and flowers arise from the axils of these bracts. The flowers are hermaphrodite and able to self-pollinate. The fruit is a hard, monogerm seedball that dehisces while still green.

== Taxonomy ==
The species Beta nana was first published in 1846 by Boiss. & Heldr.

B. nana is often treated as the sole species of the Nanae section of the Beta genus. However, it is closely related to the Corollinae section, and some authors treat it as part of the Corollinae section.

== Distribution and habitat ==
B. nana is endemic to the mountains of central and southern Greece. It mostly grows on the east and northeast slopes of mountains at elevations of 1700–2800 meters, where the climate is cool and moist. It grows on limestone soils in open areas dominated by short plants, in disturbed areas, and in rocky crevices.

In 2009, it was estimated that the population was stable with a total of 5,000 plants, but its habitat is potentially vulnerable to climate change.

== Ecology ==
Most sites inhabited by B. nana are grazed by goats and sheep. A small degree of grazing keeps nearby plants short, which may help the smaller B. nana to survive. The plant flowers from June to August. Its seeds are dispersed by meltwater flows, grazing animals, and birds.

== Uses ==
B. nana is edible. Its resistance to cold has potential in efforts to improve the sugar beet.
