= Corispermum ulopterum =

Scientific classification
- Kingdom: Plantae
- Clade: Tracheophytes
- Clade: Angiosperms
- Clade: Eudicots
- Order: Caryophyllales
- Family: Amaranthaceae
- Genus: Corispermum
- Species: C. ulopterum

Binomial name
- Corispermum ulopterum Fenzl ex Ledeb.

Species of plant in the amaranth family

Corispermum ulopterum is a species of flowering plant in the family Amaranthaceae, native to Irkutsk Oblast in Siberia. It is found only on the beaches of Lake Baikal.
