= Beta corolliflora =

Scientific classification
- Kingdom: Plantae
- Clade: Embryophytes
- Clade: Tracheophytes
- Clade: Angiosperms
- Clade: Eudicots
- Order: Caryophyllales
- Family: Amaranthaceae
- Genus: Beta
- Species: B. corolliflora

Binomial name
- Beta corolliflora Zosimovic ex Buttler

Species of flowering plant

Beta corolliflora is a species of wild beet in the family Amaranthaceae, native to Turkey, the Transcaucasus, and Iran. It is being studied for its resistance to beet curly top virus in an effort to improve the sugar beet.
