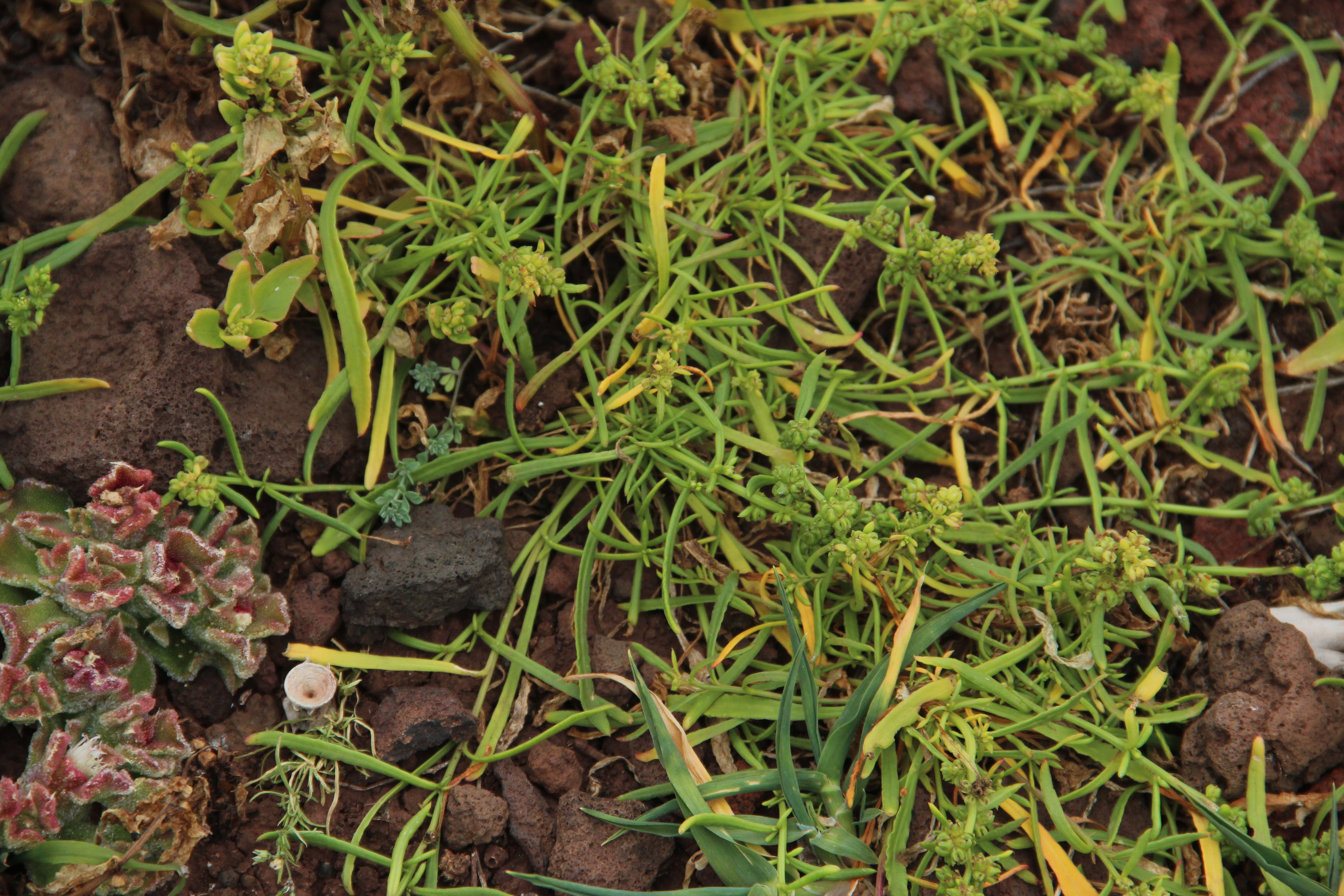
- Habit
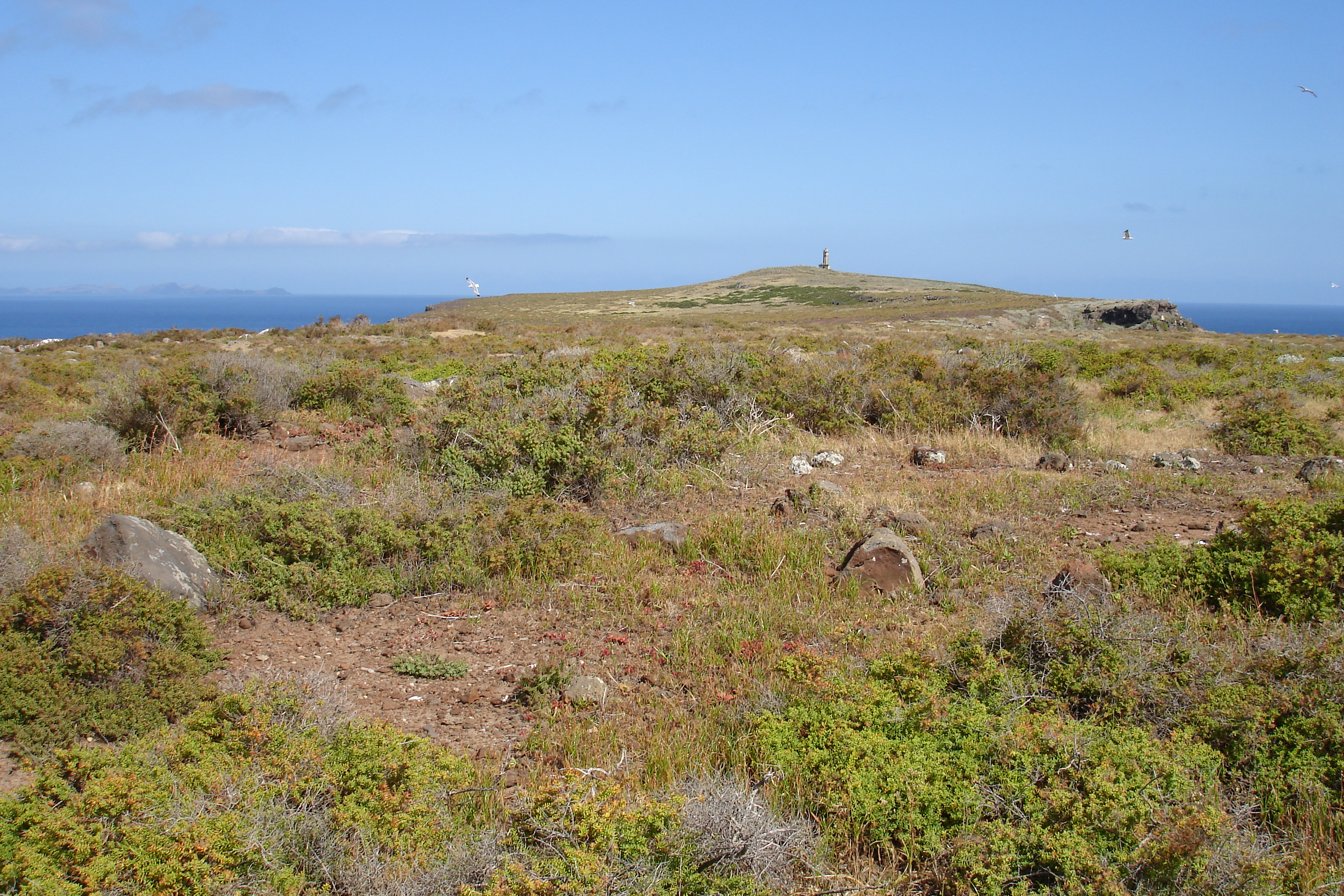
- Chão islet, with Cevada islet on the horizon

Conservation status
- Critically Endangered (IUCN 3.1)

Scientific classification
- Kingdom: Plantae
- Clade: Embryophytes
- Clade: Tracheophytes
- Clade: Angiosperms
- Clade: Eudicots
- Order: Caryophyllales
- Family: Amaranthaceae
- Genus: Beta
- Species: B. patula

Binomial name
- Beta patula Aiton

= Beta patula =

Species of flowering plant

Beta patula is a species of wild beet in the family Amaranthaceae, native to Madeira. It is a close relative of Beta vulgaris. There are about 3000 individuals alive in the wild, distributed on two uninhabited islets; Ilhéu Chão, and Ilhéu da Cevada—also called dos Desembarcadouros—which is an extension of Ponta de São Lourenço and separated from it by only a few meters during high tide.
