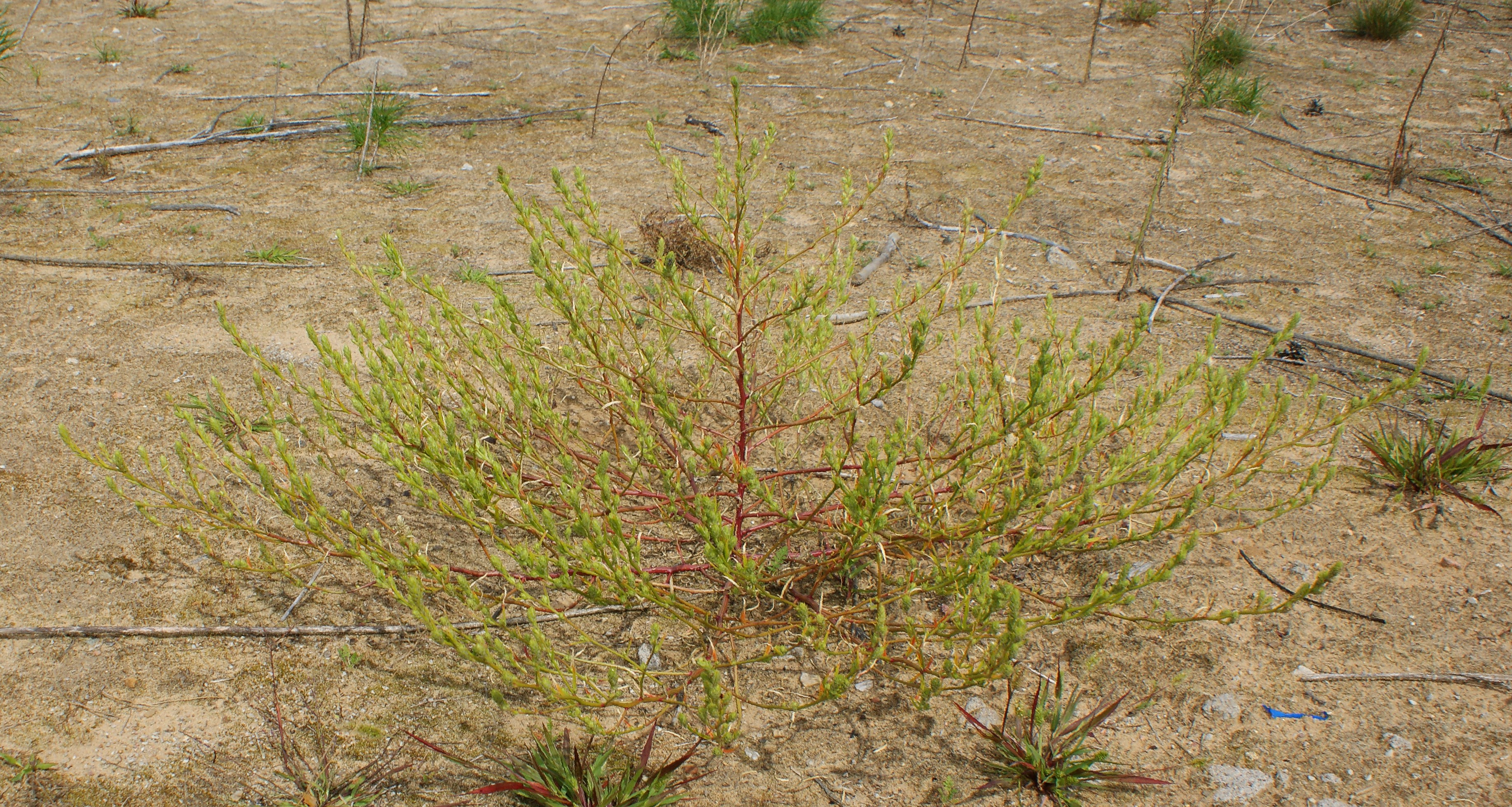

Scientific classification
- Kingdom: Plantae
- Clade: Tracheophytes
- Clade: Angiosperms
- Clade: Eudicots
- Order: Caryophyllales
- Family: Amaranthaceae
- Genus: Corispermum
- Species: C. pallasii

Binomial name
- Corispermum pallasii Steven

= Corispermum pallasii =

Species of flowering plant

Corispermum pallasii, common name Pallas bugseed, is a plant apparently native to Siberia but naturalized in Europe, Canada, and the Great Lakes Region of the United States. It is a branched herb growing on sand dunes and other sandy soils.

This plant is named after botanist and zoologist Peter Simon Pallas and was published by Stevens as Corispermum pallasii in Mém. Soc. Imp. Naturalistes Moscou. 5: 336. 1817.

Subspecies:

- Corispermum pallasii subsp. membranaceum (Bisch. ex Shnittspalm) Tzvelev (synonym: Corispermum membranaceum (Bisch. ex Shnittspalm) Iljin)
