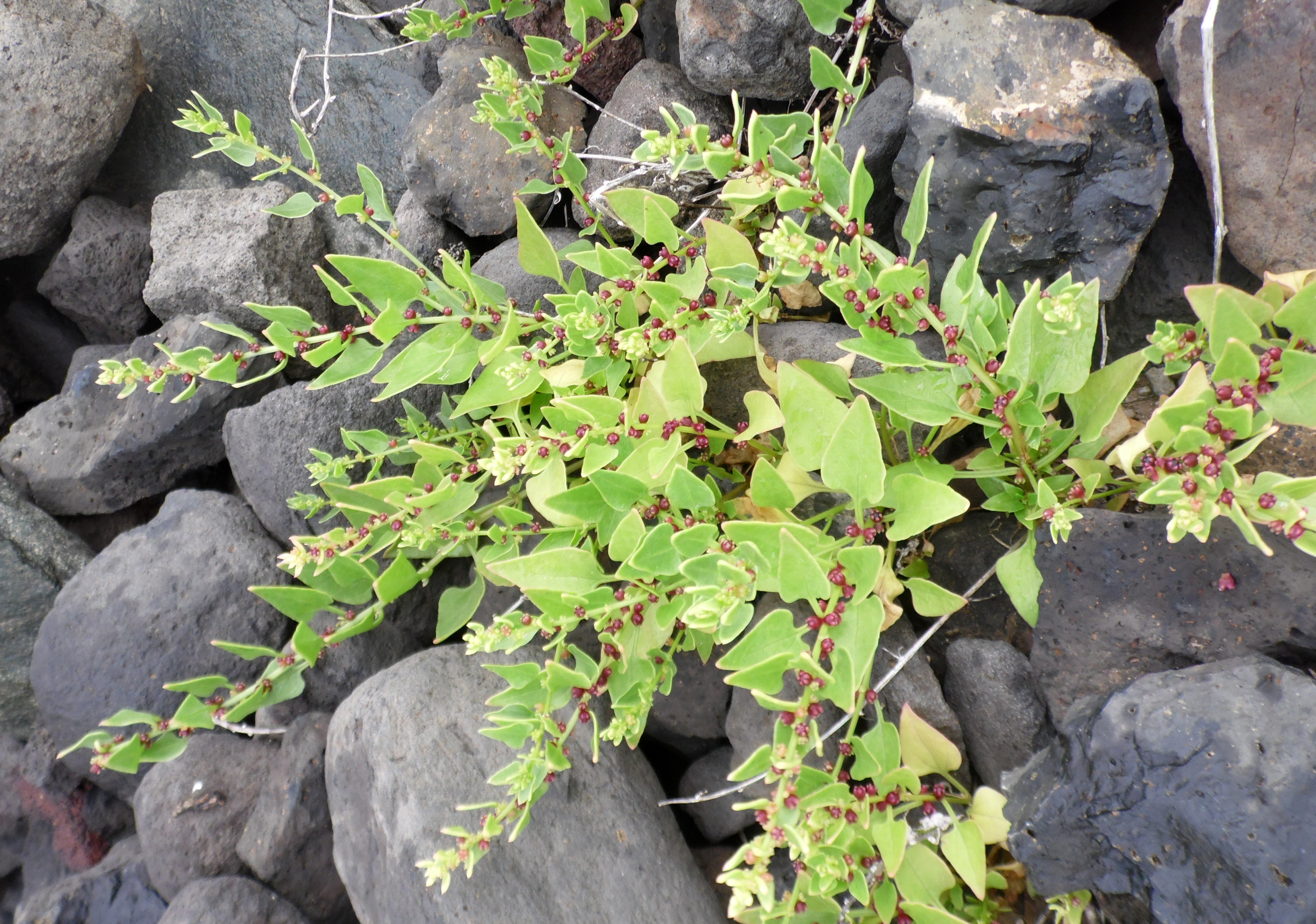
- Patellifolia patellaris

Scientific classification
- Kingdom: Plantae
- Clade: Tracheophytes
- Clade: Angiosperms
- Clade: Eudicots
- Order: Caryophyllales
- Family: Amaranthaceae
- Subfamily: Betoideae
- Tribe: Hablitzieae
- Genus: Patellifolia; A.J.Scott, Ford-Lloyd & J.T. Williams

Species
- 1-3 species, see text

Synonyms
- Beta sect. Procumbentes Ulbr.

= Patellifolia =

Genus of flowering plants

Patellifolia is a genus of flowering plants in the subfamily Betoideae of the family Amaranthaceae. These are mostly procumbent herbs occurring in the Western Mediterranean region and Macaronesia, with some isolated occurrences in North Africa and at the Horn of Africa. They are of interest as crop wild relatives of sugar beet.

== Description ==
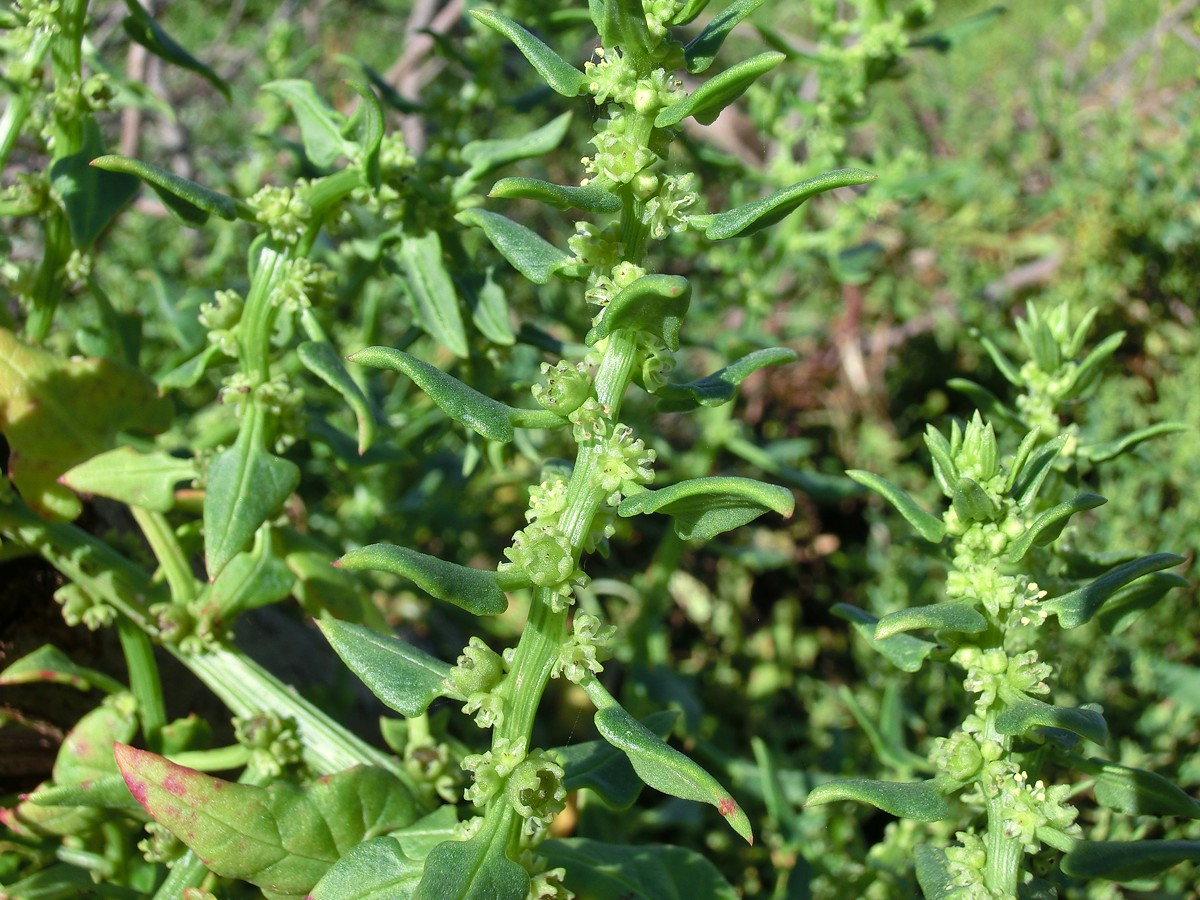
Inflorescence of Patellifolia procumbens

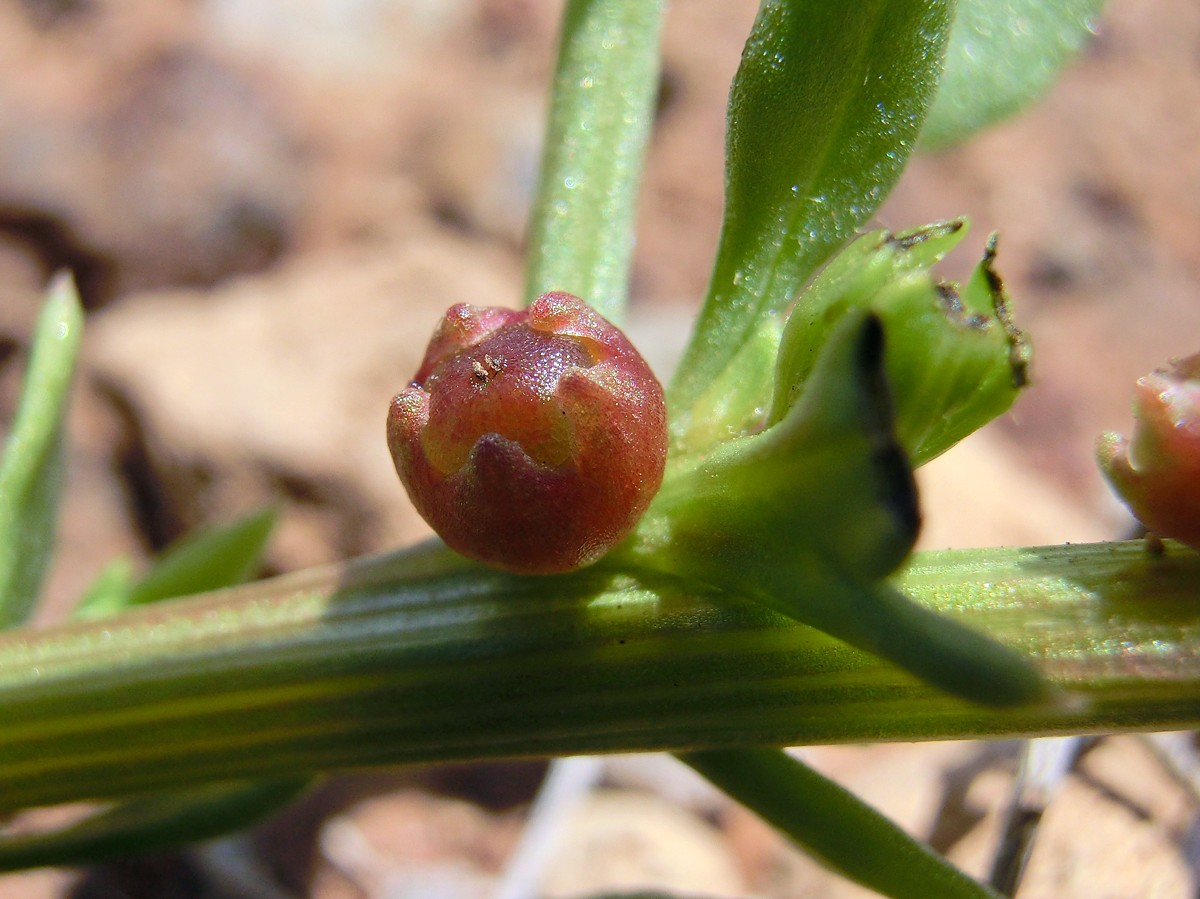
Fruit of Patellifolia patellaris

Patellifolia are annual or perennial herbs, growing erect or often procumbent. The alternate leaves have a petiole, their leaf blade is heart-shaped or hastate.

The spike-like inflorescences consist of glomerules of one to three flowers sitting in the axils of leaf-like bracts. The free flowers are hermaphrodite. The perianth consists of five herbaceous, slightly keeled tepal lobes which are connate at base. There are five stamens opposite to the tepals, their filaments are fused at base forming a disc. The ovary is semi-inferior with 2 stigmas.

In fruit, the ovary is partly immersed in the enlarged base of the perianth. The tepal lobes are not modified and appressed to the fruit. The solitary fruits are nearly globular capsules, they fall down when ripe and open with a circumscissile lid. The vertical seed contains an annular embryo and copious perisperm (feeding tissue).

== Distribution and habitat ==
Patellifolia is mainly distributed in the Western Mediterranean region (Spain, Morocco), Macaronesia and Cape Verde Islands. There are also some isolated occurrences in North Africa (Hoggar Mountains and Tassili n'Ajjer, Libya), and in the Horn of Africa region (Socotra, Somalia).

The plants grow in more or less coastal habitats from sea level up to 200 m, in Macaronesia and the Western Mediterranean region, and also in Socotra. But in the North African mountains they were found at higher altitudes up to 2000 m, and also in Somalia at 1150 m.

== Systematics ==
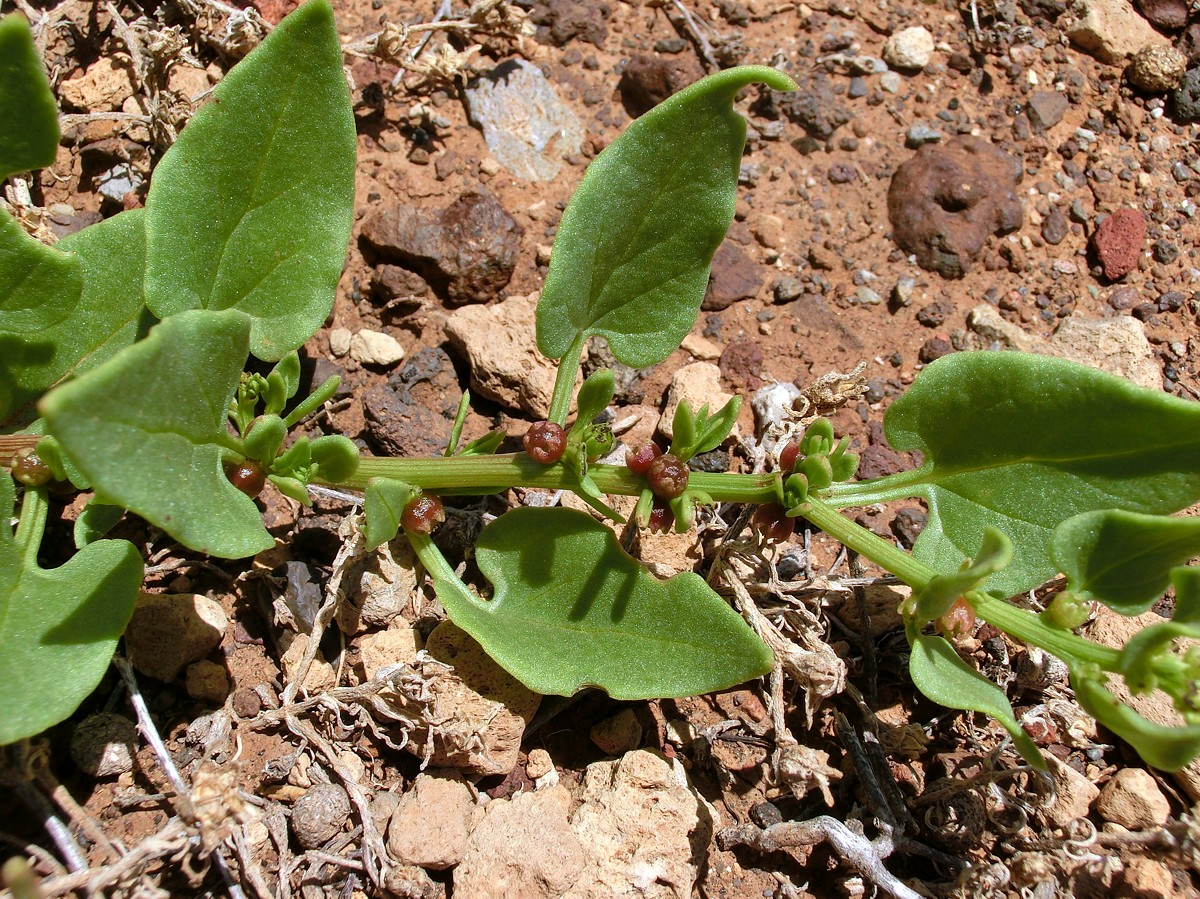
Patellifolia patellaris

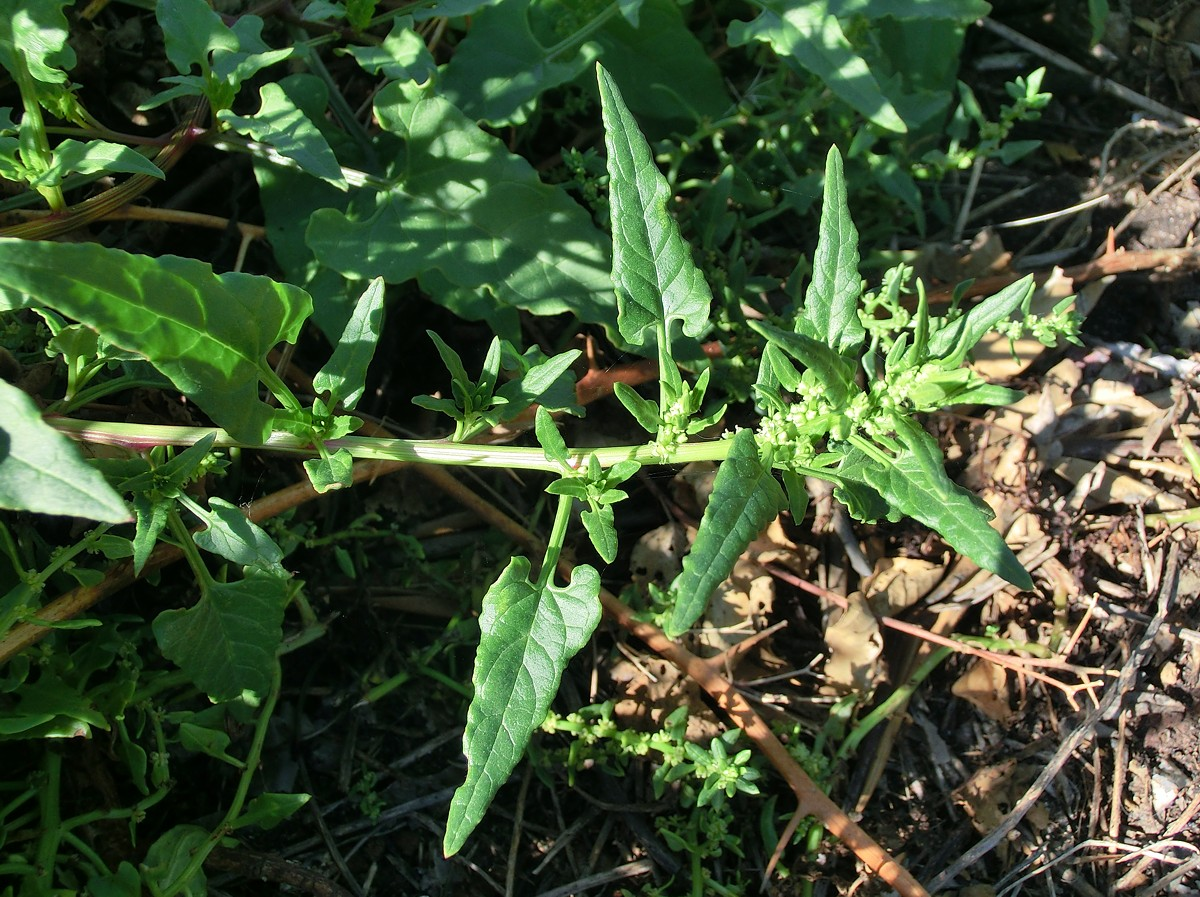
Patellifolia procumbens

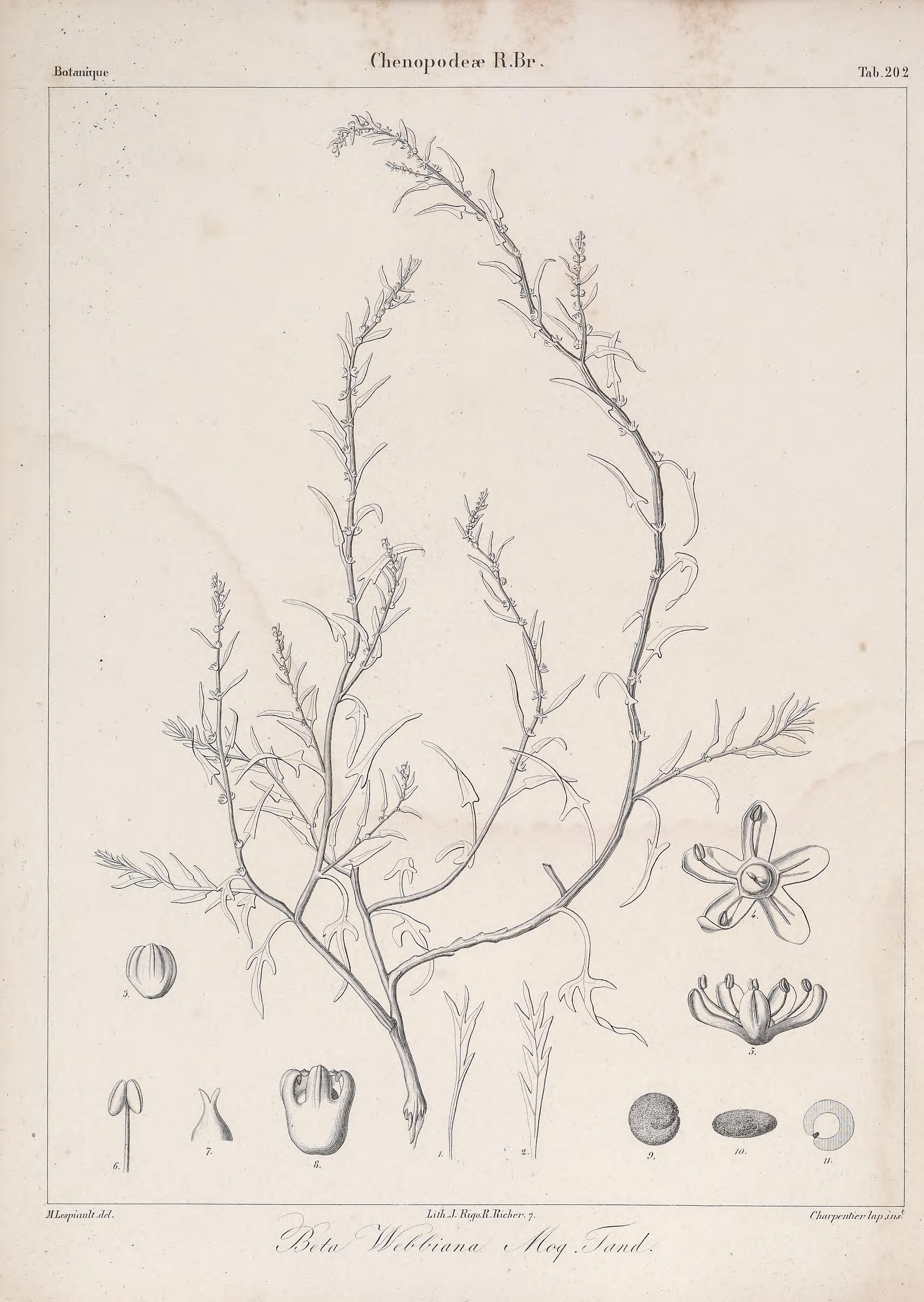
Patellifolia webbiana

The genus Patellifolia was published in 1977 by A J Scott, Brian V. Ford-Lloyd and J. Trevor Williams, with the type species Patellifolia webbiana. The same authors had described this taxon already in 1976 as Patellaria J.T. Williams, A.J.Scott & Ford-Lloyd, but that was an illegitimate name, (because the lichen genus Patellaria Hoffmann was published earlier in 1789).

These plants were first grouped together in 1927 by Vladimir Andreevich Tranzschel as an informal unranked taxon Patellares in the genus Beta. In 1934, Oskar Eberhard Ulbrich placed them in a new section Beta sect. Procumbentes. Until 2006, Patellifolia was often not accepted as a separate genus. But recent molecular genetic studies by Kadereit et al. (2006) and Romeiras et al. (2016) revealed a deep genetic differentiation between Beta and Patellifolia and confirmed the status as own genus.

Patellifolia comprises one to three species:

- Patellifolia patellaris (Moq.) A.J. Scott & al. (Syn. Beta patellaris Moq.), in dry coastal sites or on rocks, widely distributed in Macaronesia (Canary Islands, Madeira, Cape Verde) and in the western Mediterranean (Spain, Balearic islands, Sicily, Morocco), North Africa, to the Horn of Africa.
- Patellifolia procumbens (Chr. Sm.) A.J. Scott & al. (Syn. Beta procumbens Chr. Sm.), in dry coastal sites in Macaronesia (Canary Islands, Madeira, Cape Verde).
- Patellifolia webbiana (Moq.) A.J. Scott & al. (Syn. Beta webbiana Moq.), endemic on Gran Canaria, in ruderal nitrophilous sites, Critically Endangered.

It was suggested that Patellifolia procumbens and Patellifolia webbiana might not be different species. The identification of the three species is difficult, and some distinguishing characters were found to be unreliable. Therefore, Thulin et al. (2010) proposed to treat all members of Patellifolia as a single variable species, Patellifoia procumbens. This proposal was followed in the Euro+Med Plant Base.

But Patellifolia patellaris could not be hybridised with the other two species, supporting the rank of an own species. The island species evolved recently, and because of their isolation they developed only small genetic differentiation. As a result, they show only weak genetic barriers to hybridization.

== Evolution ==
Patellifolia is a rather old genus; the divergence from its sister genus Beta probably occurred early in the Late Oligocene. Its subtaxa are relatively young, diversifying in the late Pliocene or early Quaternary. The present distribution area suggests that it was previously a widespread taxon, but later the area fragmented and extensive extinctions occurred.

== Crop wild relatives ==
Patellifolia is related to the economically important cultivated beets (Beta vulgaris subsp. vulgaris, with sugar beet, beetroot, chard and fodder beet). Therefore, Patellifolia is of great interest as Crop wild relative and potential gene donor. They seem to be resistant to some of the most serious diseases of sugar beets, to leaf spot disease caused by Cercospora beticola, curly top virus, rhizomania, and powdery mildew (Erysiphe polygoni). All three species proved to be highly resistant to the Beet cyst eelworm (Heterodera schachtii). The three species differ in their resistance level, whereas Patellifolia patellaris is not completely immune, but eelworms never develop to maturity in the other two species.
