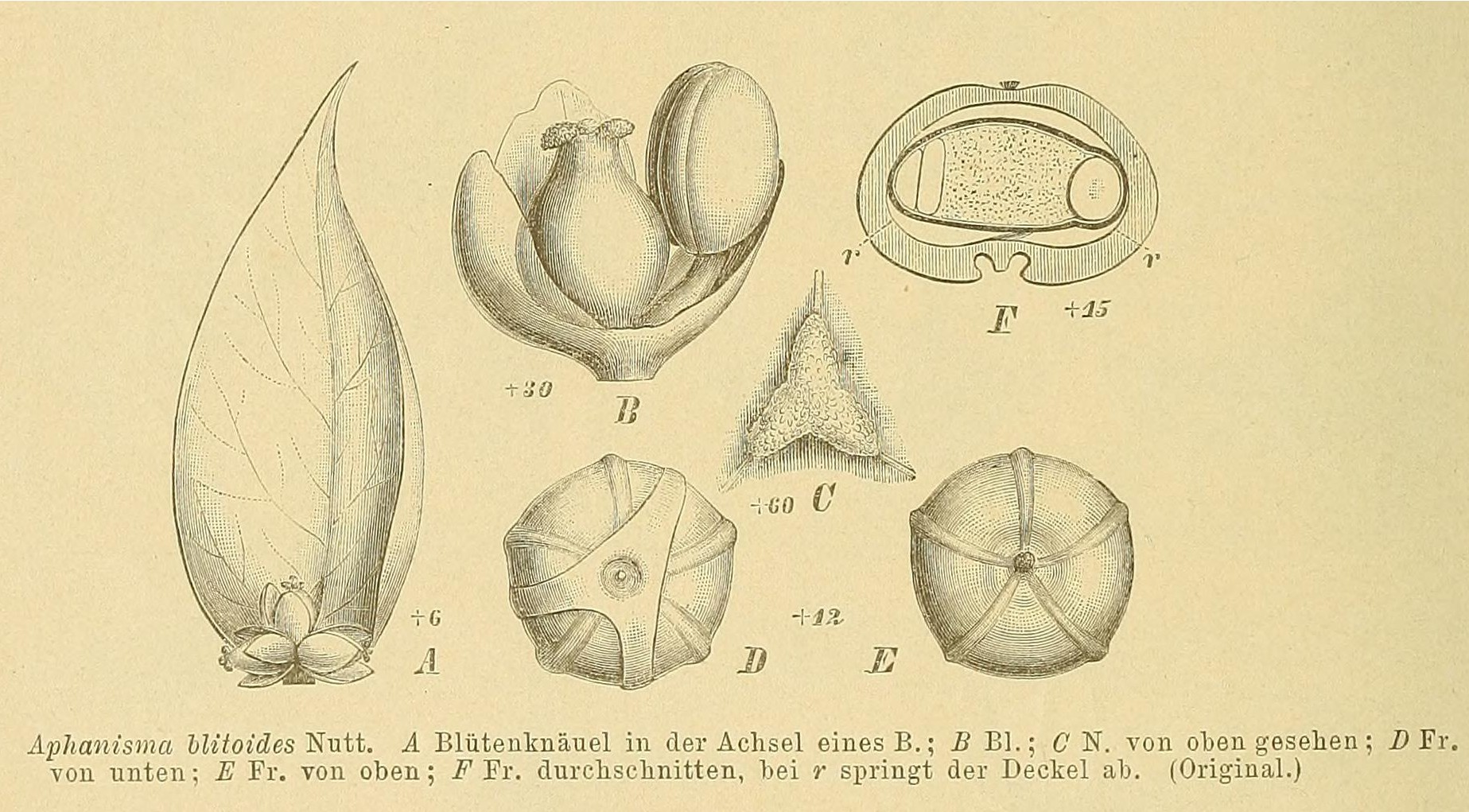
- Aphanisma blitoides

Scientific classification
- Kingdom: Plantae
- Clade: Tracheophytes
- Clade: Angiosperms
- Clade: Eudicots
- Order: Caryophyllales
- Family: Amaranthaceae
- Subfamily: Betoideae
- Tribe: Hablitzieae
- Genus: Aphanisma; Nutt. ex Moq.
- Species: A. blitoides

Binomial name
- Aphanisma blitoides Nutt. ex Moq.

= Aphanisma =

Genus of flowering plants

Aphanisma is a monotypic genus which contains the sole species Aphanisma blitoides, a rare annual plant known by the common names San Diego coastalcreeper or simply aphanisma. This is a beach-dwelling plant native to the coastline of Baja California and Southern California, including the Channel Islands. It is a succulent saline-adapted plant found in sand or scrub at the immediate coastline. It has many thin, sprawling stems, few reduced green leaves, and tiny flowers. The older stems are bright red. This plant is becoming more rare due to the disappearance of its coastal habitat. It is extirpated from much of its native range.
