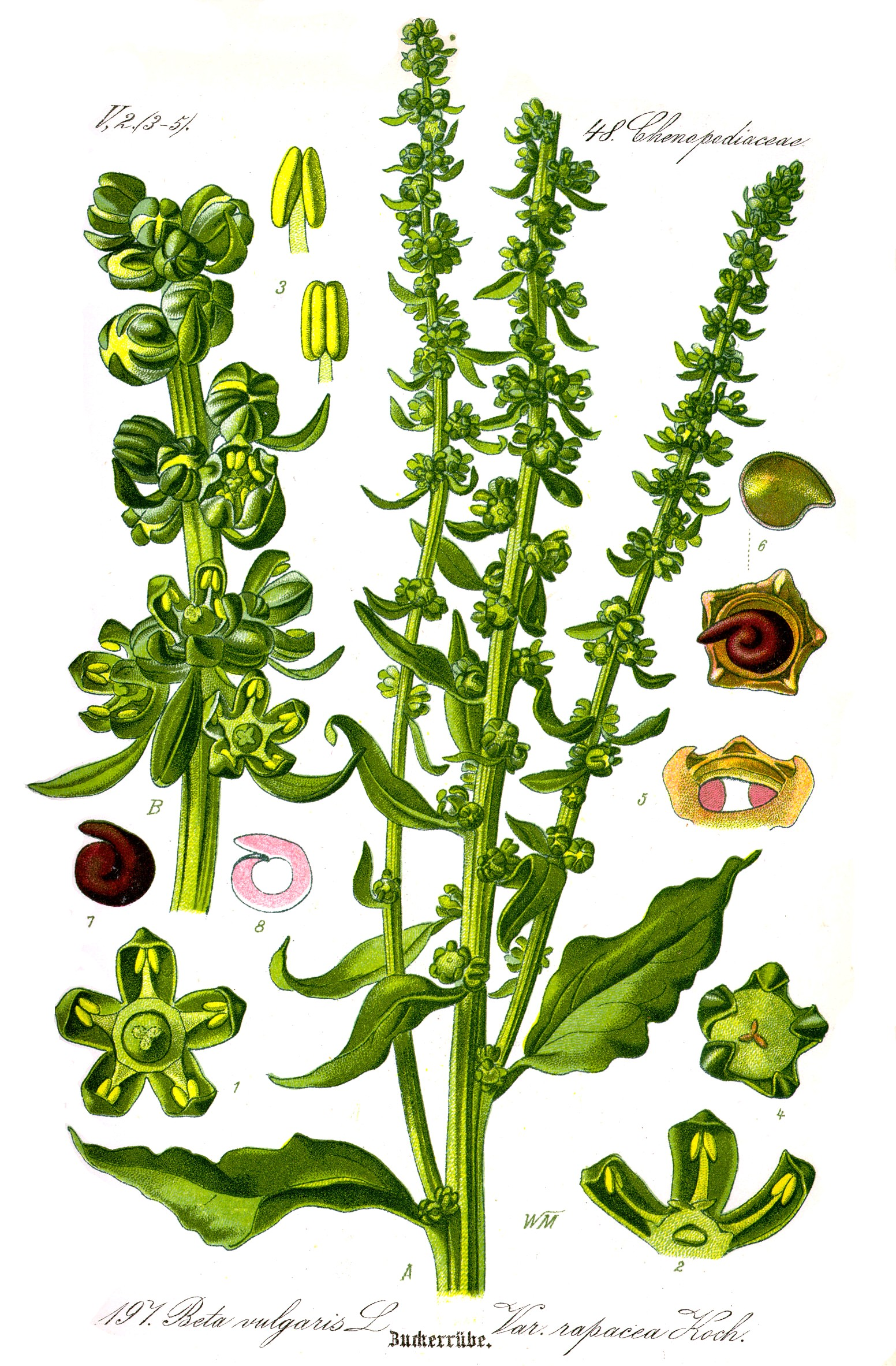
- Sugarbeet (Beta vulgaris subsp. vulgaris)

Scientific classification
- Kingdom: Plantae
- Clade: Embryophytes
- Clade: Tracheophytes
- Clade: Angiosperms
- Clade: Eudicots
- Order: Caryophyllales
- Family: Amaranthaceae
- Subfamily: Betoideae
- Tribe: Beteae; Moq.
- Genus: Beta; L.

Type species
- Beta vulgaris L.

Species
- See text

= Beta (plant) =

Genus of flowering plants in the amaranth family

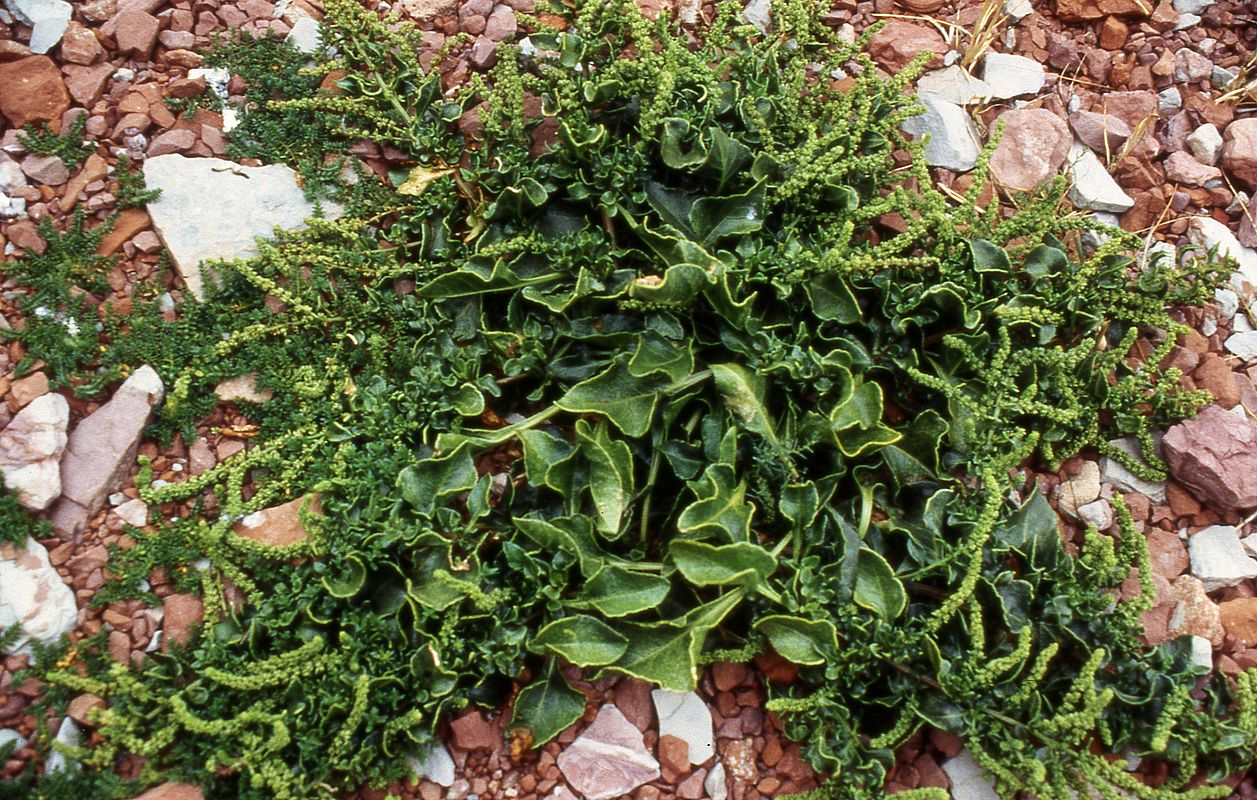
Sea beet (Beta vulgaris subsp. maritima)

Beta is a genus of flowering plants in the family Amaranthaceae. The best known member is the common beet, Beta vulgaris, but several other species are recognised. Almost all have common names containing the word "beet". Wild Beta species can be found throughout the Atlantic coast of Europe, the Mediterranean coastline, the Near East, and parts of Asia including India.

== Description ==
This genus consists of annual, biennial, or perennial species, often with fleshy, thickened roots. The stems grow erect or procumbent. The alternate leaves are petiolate or sessile, with ovate-cordate to rhombic-cuneate leaf blades, their margins mostly entire, with obtuse apex.

The inflorescences are long spikelike cymes or glomerules. Bracts can be leaflike (Beta macrorhiza) or very small, the upper half of the inflorescence often without bracts. The bisexual flowers consist of (3–) 5 basally connate perianth segments (either greenish, dorsally ridged and with hooded tips, or petaloid and whitish, yellowish, reddish, or greenish), 5 stamens, and a semi-inferior ovary with 2–3 (–5) stigmas.

The fruit (utricle) is immersed in the swollen, hardened perianth base. The fruit is indehiscent or dehiscence eventually circumscissile. The horizontal seed is orbicular or reniform, with dark brown, smooth or glossy seed coat. The seed contains an annular embryo and copious perisperm.

The base chromosome number is x = 9.

== Systematics and distribution ==
The genus Beta was published in 1753 by Carl Linnaeus. The type specimen is Beta vulgaris L. It is the type genus for subfamily Betoideae in family Amaranthaceae (s.l, including the Chenopodiaceae).

Kadereit and colleagues used phylogenetic inference to classify members of the genus into two sections with seven or eight species:

- Beta sect. Beta: the greenish tepals are dorsally ridged and have hooded tips. The tips are partly appressed to and mostly longer than the fruit. Wild plants are growing on shores and salty soils. The classification of this group has changed very often (comprising one to seven species, with five to 35 infraspecific taxa).
  - Beta macrocarpa Guss.: occurring on Mediterranean coasts from the southern Iberian peninsula and northwestern Africa, Sicily, Italy, and Greece, Crete and the Aegean, to Israel.
  - Beta vulgaris L., distributed from the Atlantic coasts of Western Europe and the Mediterranean region to India.
    - Beta vulgaris subsp. adanensis (Pamukç. ex Aellen) Ford-Lloyd & J.T.Williams (Syn.: Beta adanensis Pamukç. ex Aellen): occurring in Greece, Cyprus, Israel, western Syria and Turkey.
    - Beta vulgaris subsp. vulgaris (Syn.: Beta vulgaris subsp. cicla (L.) Arcang., Beta vulgaris subsp. rapacea (Koch) Döll): all cultivated beets (chard, beetroot), sugar beet, and mangelwurzel) belong to this subspecies.
    - Beta vulgaris subsp. maritima, Sea beet, the wild ancestor of all cultivated beets. Its distribution area reaches from the coasts of Western Europe and the Mediterranean Sea to the Near and Middle East and to India.
  - Beta patula Aiton, endemic on Madeira, Critically Endangered.
- Beta sect. Corollinae Ulbr. (including Beta Sect. Nanae Ulbr.): the corolla-like tepals are whitish, yellowish, reddish, or greenish. Occurring from the eastern Mediterranean area to Southwest Asia.
  - Beta lomatogona Fisch. & C.A.Meyer: perennial, occurring from Turkey and Transcaucasia to the northwestern Iran, on rocky slopes and in cultivated places.
  - Beta macrorhiza Stev.: perennial, occurring from central Turkey to northwestern Iran, at rocky slopes and edges of fields.
  - Beta corolliflora Zosimovic ex Buttler: perennial, from eastern Turkey to northwestern Iran, at rocky slopes and edges of fields.
  - Beta trigyna Waldst. & Kit.: perennial, occurring from the Balcan peninsula, Ukraine, Turkey and Caucasia to Iran. Naturalized in the British Islands and France.
  - Beta nana Boiss. & Heldr.: perennial, endemic to the mountains of Greece.

Excluded species: Beta patellaris Moq., Beta procumbens C.Sm. ex Hornem., and Beta webbiana Moq. are treated as an own genus, Patellifolia A.J.Scott, Ford-Lloyd & J.T.Williams.

== Evolution ==
The differentiation between Beta and Patellifolia probably occurred early in the Late Oligocene. The Mediterranean ancestors of Beta began to differentiate around seven million years ago (Messinian Age of the Late Miocene). They evolved into two well-differentiated clades on each side of the Mediterranean: the western wild beets Beta vulgaris, Beta macrocarpa, and Beta patula, occurring in coastal and ruderal habitats; and the easternmost wild beets Beta corolliflora, Beta nana and Beta trigyna, occurring in continental mountainous zones.

During the Messinian salinity crisis (5.96 to 5.33 million years ago) the Mediterranean Sea partly desiccated and left widespread salt marshes and halophytic habitats. After the sea had flooded back, the marshes were fragmented and taxa became isolated. Subsequent climatic changes led to further diversification. The western wild beets later colonized the Macaronesian Islands during the Pleistocene, probably by adaptations of the diaspores for sea dispersal (thalassochory). On these islands, the diversification was quite recent, and seems to be complicated by events of hybridization and gene flow.

== Uses ==
Beet (Beta vulgaris) has an immense economic importance as sugar crop (Sugar beet), and a great importance as a vegetable (Chard, Beetroot), and as fodder plant (Mangelwurzel). This species is also used as medicinal plant, ornamental plant, dye and as renewable resource. It is the crop species with the highest economical value in the order Caryophyllales. Therefore, the members of Beta and the related genus Patellifolia are interesting as crop wild relatives.

=== Safety ===
Sphaeraphides might be present.

== Bibliography ==
- Gulliver, George (1864). "Observations on Raphides and other Crystals". The Annals and Magazine of Natural History, Including Zoology, Botany, and Geology. Third Series. 14: 250–252.
