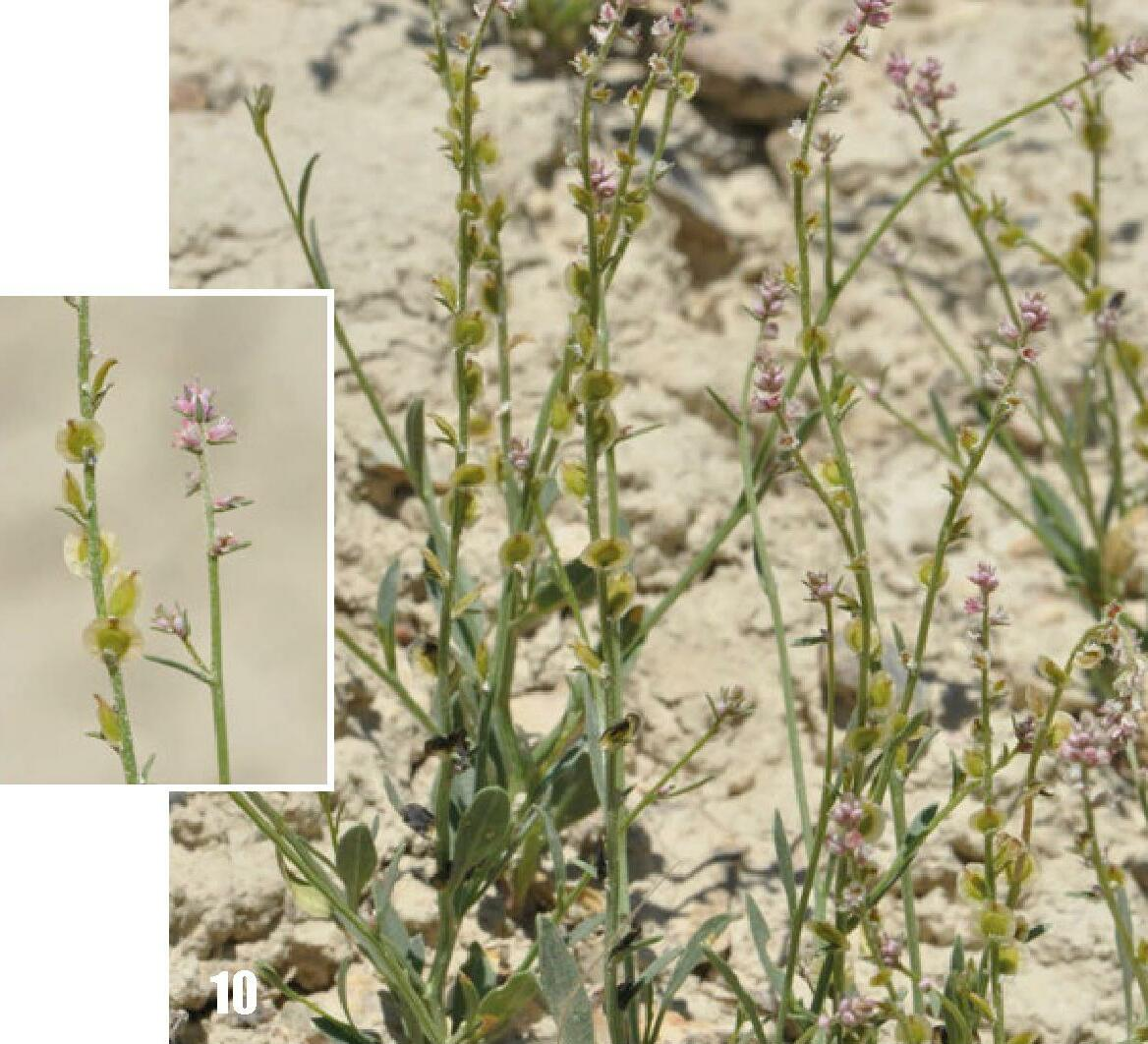
- Anthochlamys tjanschanica

Scientific classification
- Kingdom: Plantae
- Clade: Tracheophytes
- Clade: Angiosperms
- Clade: Eudicots
- Order: Caryophyllales
- Family: Amaranthaceae
- Genus: Anthochlamys; Fenzl ex Endl. (1837)

Synonyms
- Peltispermum Moq. (1840)

= Anthochlamys =

Genus of flowering plants

Anthochlamys is a genus of flowering plants belonging to the family Amaranthaceae.

Its native range is Iran to Pakistan and Central Asia.

Species:

- Anthochlamys afghanica Podlech – southern Afghanistan and western Pakistan
- Anthochlamys multinervis Rech.f. – central Iran
- Anthochlamys polygaloides (Fisch. & C.A.Mey.) Moq. – southeastern Transcaucasus to Iran, Afghanistan, Pakistan, and Uzbekistan
- Anthochlamys tjanschanica Iljin ex Aellen – Tian Shan Mountains of Kazakhstan, Kyrgyzstan, and Uzbekistan
- Anthochlamys turcomanica Iljin – northeastern Iran and southern Turkmenistan
