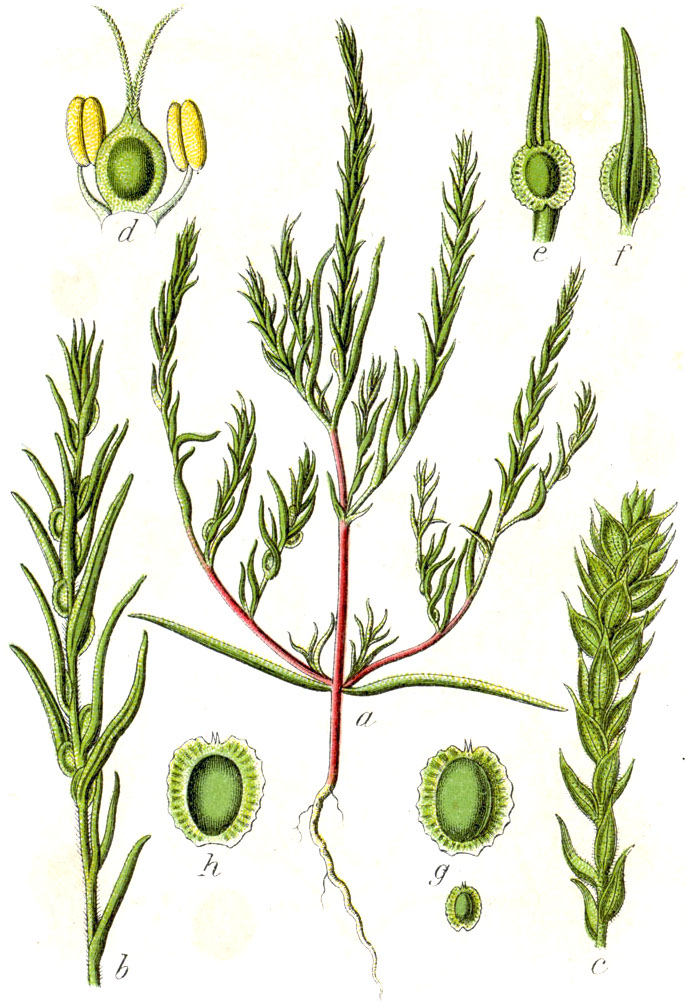
- Corispermum marschallii

Scientific classification
- Kingdom: Plantae
- Clade: Tracheophytes
- Clade: Angiosperms
- Clade: Eudicots
- Order: Caryophyllales
- Family: Amaranthaceae
- Subfamily: Corispermoideae; Ulbr.

Genera
- 3 genera; see text

= Corispermoideae =

Subfamily of flowering plants

The Corispermoideae are a subfamily of the Amaranthaceae, formerly in family Chenopodiaceae.

== Description ==
The species of the subfamily Corispermoideae are all annual plants. Leaves are mostly alternate, sessile or petiole-like attenuate, laminate, scleromorphic. Typical are branched (dendritic) trichomes (except in Anthochlamys) on young plant parts.

The flowers are arranged in simple, compact (sometimes globular) partial inflorescences, or in spikes. Bracteoles are missing. The perianth consists of 1-5 white, membranaceous tepals (missing in some Corispermum species) without vascular bundles, not persistent. The pollen grains of Agriophyllum and Corispermum are of the "Chenopodium type", of Anthochlamys of the "Anthochlamys type".

The fruits possess supporting tissue consisting of macrosclereids. The seeds have a vertical embryo and copious perisperm.

== Distribution ==
The subfamily Corispermoideae is distributed in Asia, Europe and North America.

== Photosynthesis pathway ==
All species studied show non-Kranz corispermoid leaf anatomy and C_{3} photosynthesis.

== Taxonomy ==
The tribe Corispermeae was published in 1840 by Alfred Moquin-Tandon (in Chenopodearum Monographica Enumeratio, Loss, Paris, S. 182). Oskar Eberhard Ulbrich raised it to subfamily level named Corispermoideae in 1934 (in Chenopodiaceae, S. 379–584 in Adolf Engler & Karl Anton Eugen Prantl (Edt.): Die natürlichen Pflanzenfamilien, Band 16 c, Engelmann, Leipzig).

Molecular data support the monophyly of the subfamily.

It contains only one tribe:

- Tribus Corispermeae, with 3 genera:
  - Agriophyllum M.Bieb., with 6 species in Asian regions with arid climate
  - Anthochlamys Fenzl., with 2 species in Asian regions with arid climate
  - Corispermum L., with at least 65 species in extratropical regions of Eurasia and North America
