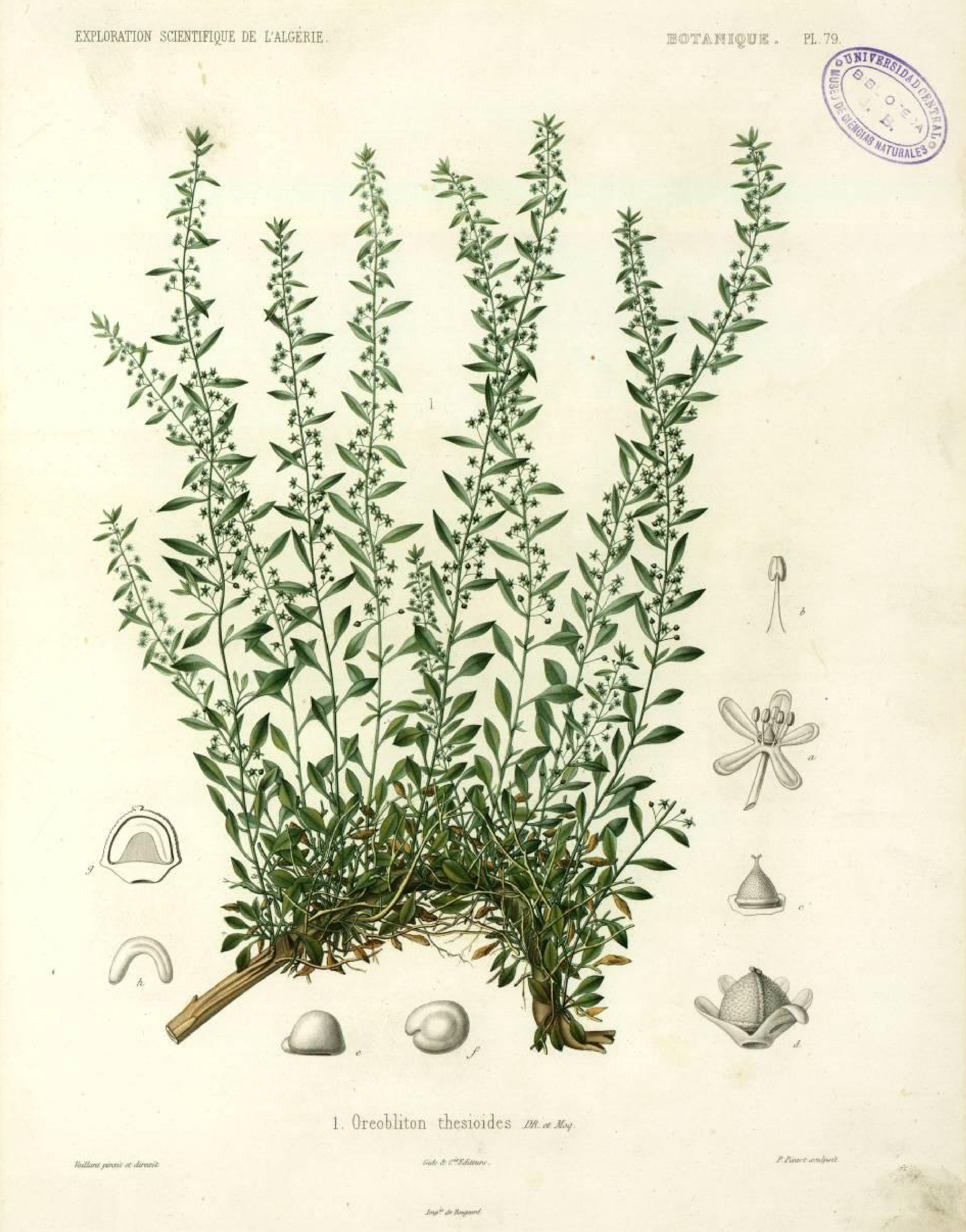
- Oreobliton thesioides

Scientific classification
- Kingdom: Plantae
- Clade: Tracheophytes
- Clade: Angiosperms
- Clade: Eudicots
- Order: Caryophyllales
- Family: Amaranthaceae
- Genus: Oreobliton; Durieu & Moq. (1847)
- Species: O. thesioides

Binomial name
- Oreobliton thesioides Durieu & Moq.

Synonyms
- Neretia Moq. (1849); Neretia thesioides (Durieu & Moq.) Moq. (1849); Obione chenopodioides Coss. & Durieu (1855)

= Oreobliton =

Genus of plants

Oreobliton is a monotypic genus of flowering plants belonging to the family Amaranthaceae. The only species is Oreobliton thesioides. Its native range is Algeria and Tunisia in northwestern Africa.
