= Trommsdorffia =

Trommsdorffia may refer to:

- Trommsdorffia Bernh., 1800, a genus of flowering plants in the family Asteraceae; synonym of Hypochaeris
- Trommsdorffia Mart., 1826, nom. illeg., replaced by Pedersenia (Amaranthaceae, Plantae)
