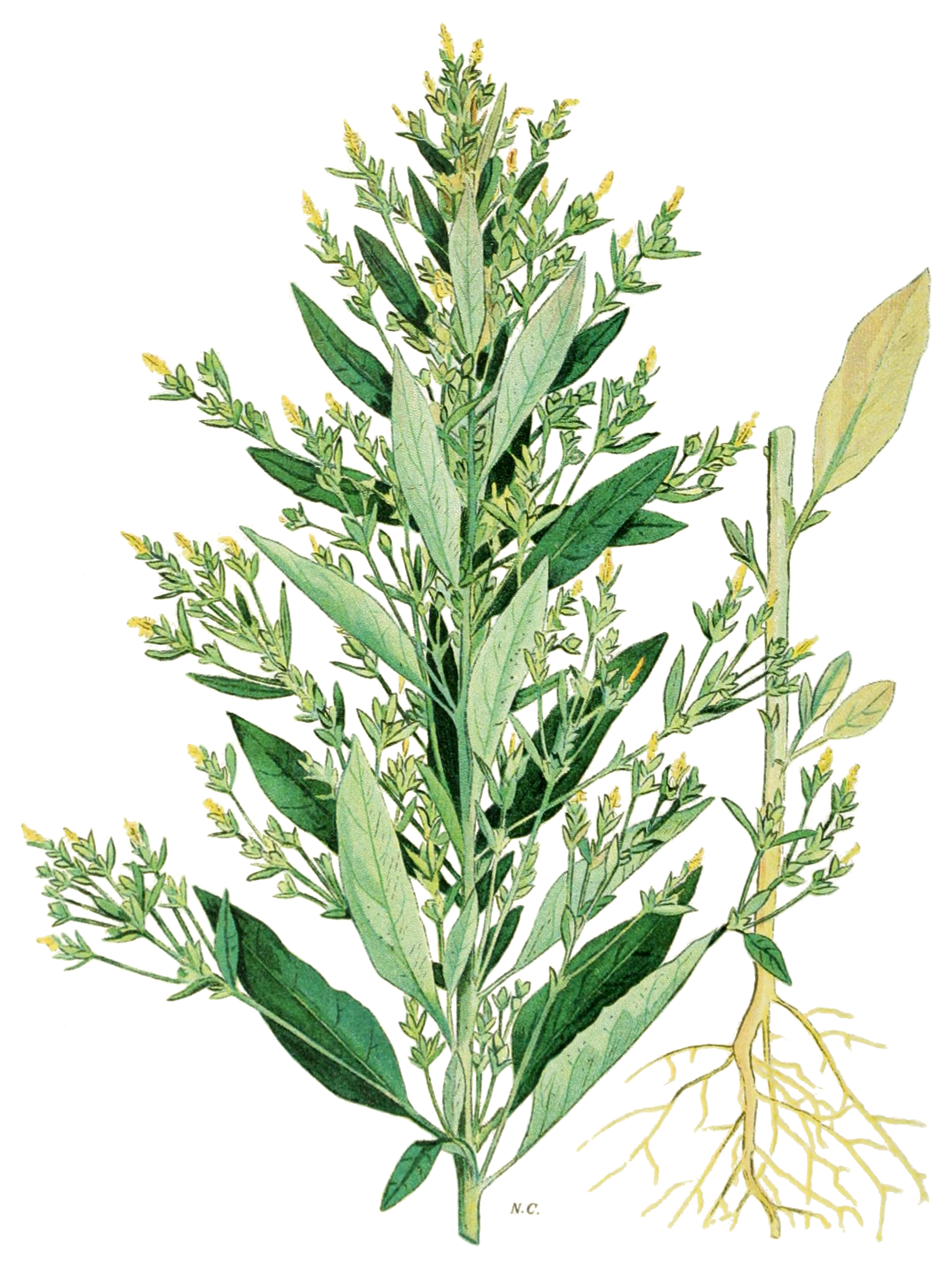

Scientific classification
- Kingdom: Plantae
- Clade: Tracheophytes
- Clade: Angiosperms
- Clade: Eudicots
- Order: Caryophyllales
- Family: Amaranthaceae
- Genus: Axyris
- Species: A. amaranthoides

Binomial name
- Axyris amaranthoides L.

= Axyris amaranthoides =

Species of flowering plant

Axyris amaranthoides, commonly known as Russian pigweed and upright axyris, is a species of flowering plant in the family Amaranthaceae, that has been introduced to North America. It was introduced into Manitoba in 1886 and has since spread to other provinces in Canada and the United States.

== Description ==
Axyris amaranthoides is an annual monoecious (has both the male and female flowers in the same individual) plant. It has a taproot type of root system, and its stem is about 20–80 centimetres (8–31 in) tall and rigidly upright. The lower leaves have short petioles and have a narrowly oval to long-pointed shape. The upper leaves are narrowly lance-like to egg shaped, and attached directly to the stems or branches without petioles. The leaves on the main stems are much bigger than branch leaves, but all the leaves are serrated with slightly bent or curved backward or downward edges. A single leaf is present at each node along the stem, forming an ascending spiral pattern (alternate arrangement; see phyllotaxis).

Male flowers grow on the top of stem in the form of slim spike. One or two female flowers grow from the leaf axils below the male flowers. Fruits are oval-shaped, reddish-coloured and dry (i.e., with thin pericarps). Some fruits are winged on one side and flattened, and will germinate rapidly. Other fruits are wingless, and tend to be dormant. The flowering time is in July and August.

== Habitat ==
Generally, A. amaranthoides grows well on very fine-grained mineral soil and soils that are made up of waste or rough fragments of stone, brick, and concrete. It can be found in dry roadsides and waste places, or in open flat habitats like grassland.

== Range ==
Country	Regions
China	Gansu, Hebei, Heilongjiang, Jilin, Liaoning, Nei Monggol, Qinghai, Shaanxi, Xinjiang
Siberia	Russian Federation - Eastern Siberia, Western Siberia
Mongolia	Mongolia
Russian Far East	Russian Federation - Far East
Eastern Asia	Japan; Korea
Middle Asia	Kazakhstan
East Europe	Southeast Europe

Axyris amaranthoides is naturalized in North America, but is originally from Russia or Siberia (Scoggan, 1978). It is distributed throughout Canada and the northern United States. It spread in several provinces in Canada, including British Columbia, New Brunswick, Prince Edward Island, Nova Scotia, Québec, Saskatchewan and Ontario. A. amaranthoides can also be found in some regions of Asia and Europe outside its native range.

== Importance to humans ==
Axyris amaranthoides is widely used in traditional Chinese medicine. It has several functions, such as clearing the liver and improving vision, relieving rheumatic pains, treating decayed teeth, relieving swelling and preventing high blood pressure. Like that of many wind-pollinated plants, the pollen of A. amaranthoides can cause allergic respiratory diseases.

== Importance to ecosystems ==
Axyris amaranthoides spreads aggressively to many regions, and displaces native species in the process; it is considered an invasive species that had negative influences in North Dakota. In addition, A. amaranthoides may cause seed contamination in cereal crops.

== Conservation ==
The conservation status of A. amaranthoides is not listed in Canada or the United States, probably because it is an invasive species and the two countries have programs in place to control its spread.
