= Pupalia =

Scientific classification
- Kingdom: Plantae
- Clade: Tracheophytes
- Clade: Angiosperms
- Clade: Eudicots
- Order: Caryophyllales
- Family: Amaranthaceae
- Genus: Pupalia; Juss.

Synonyms
- Codivalia Raf.; Desmochaeta DC.; Kommia Ehrenb. ex Schweinf.; Pupal Adans.; Syama Jones

Genus of plants

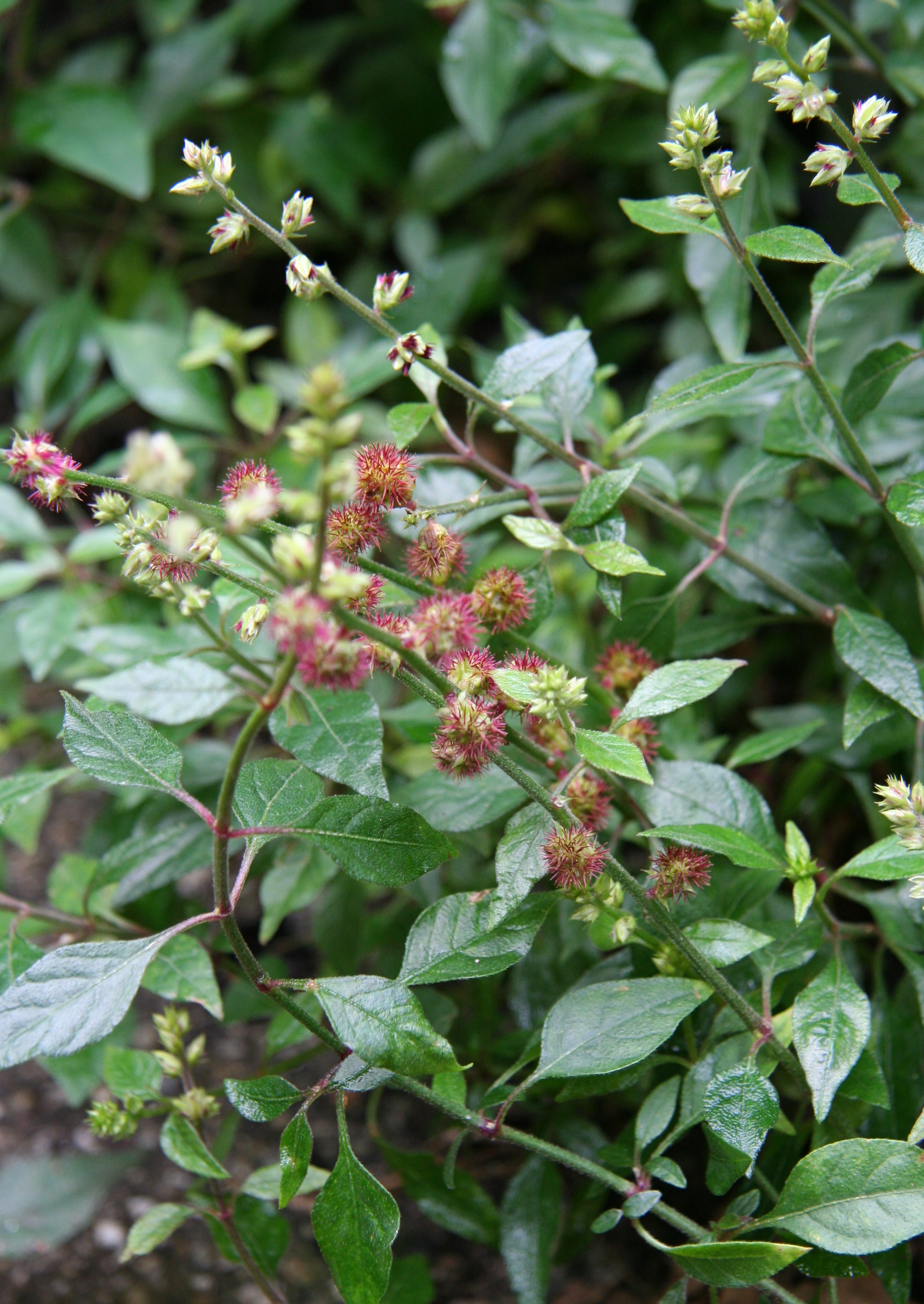
Pupalia lappacea

Pupalia is a genus of flowering plants belonging to the family Amaranthaceae.

Its native range is the tropical and subtropical Old World.

== Species ==
Four species are accepted.

- Pupalia grandiflora Peter
- Pupalia lappacea (L.) Juss.
- Pupalia micrantha Hauman
- Pupalia robecchii Lopr.

=== Formerly placed here ===
- Sebsebea orthacantha (Hochst. ex Asch.) Di Vincenzo, Berends., Wondafr. & Borsch (as Pupalia orthacantha Hochst. ex Asch.)
