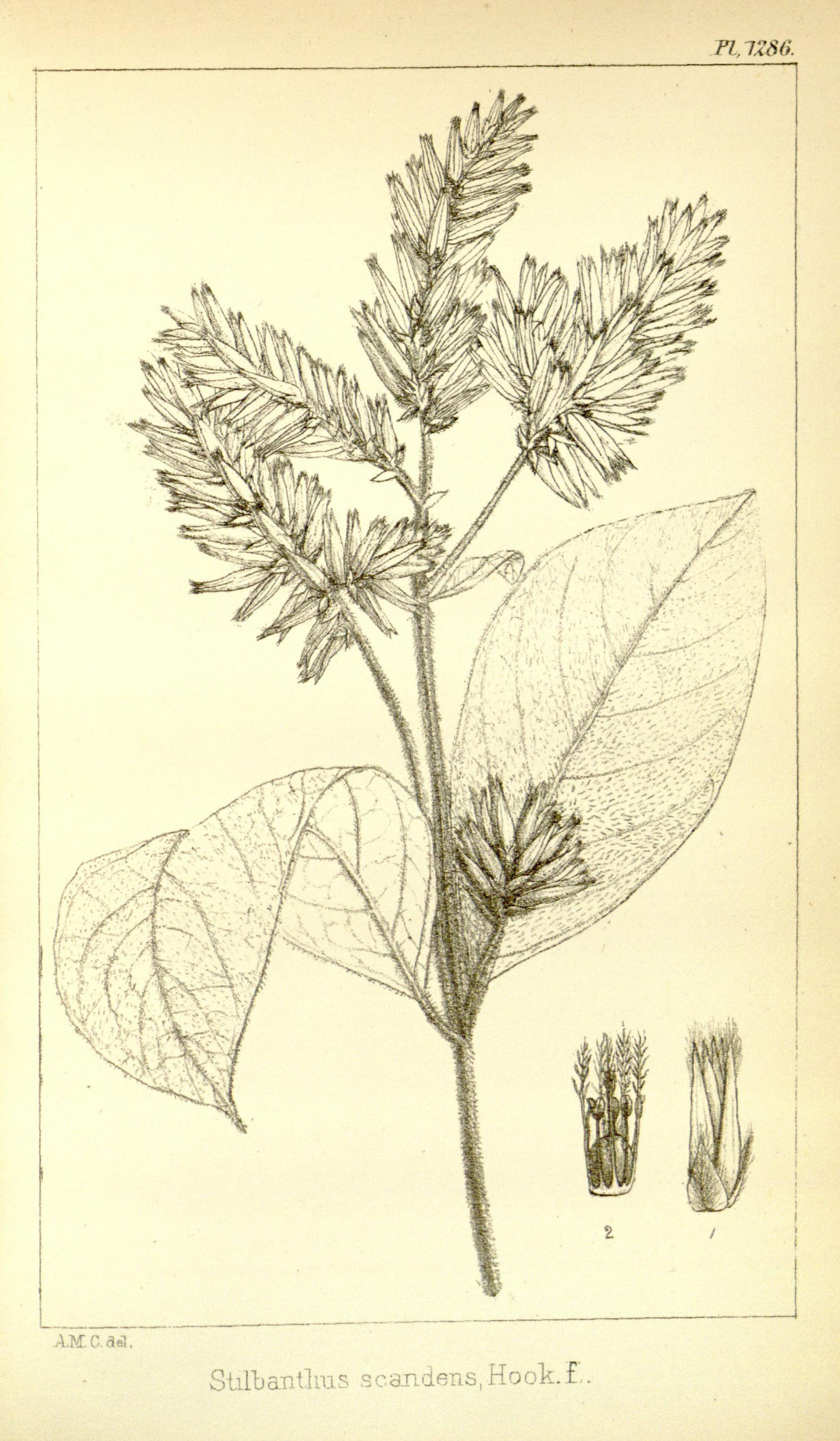
- Stilbanthus scandens

Scientific classification
- Kingdom: Plantae
- Clade: Tracheophytes
- Clade: Angiosperms
- Clade: Eudicots
- Order: Caryophyllales
- Family: Amaranthaceae
- Genus: Stilbanthus; Hook.f. (1879)
- Species: S. scandens

Binomial name
- Stilbanthus scandens Hook.f. (1879)

Synonyms
- Achyranthes scandens Hook.f. & Thomson ex C.B.Clarke (1876), nom. subnud.

= Stilbanthus =

Genus of plants

Stilbanthus is a monotypic genus of flowering plants belonging to the family Amaranthaceae. The only species is Stilbanthus scandens.

Its native range is Easatern Himalaya to Southern China and Myanmar.
