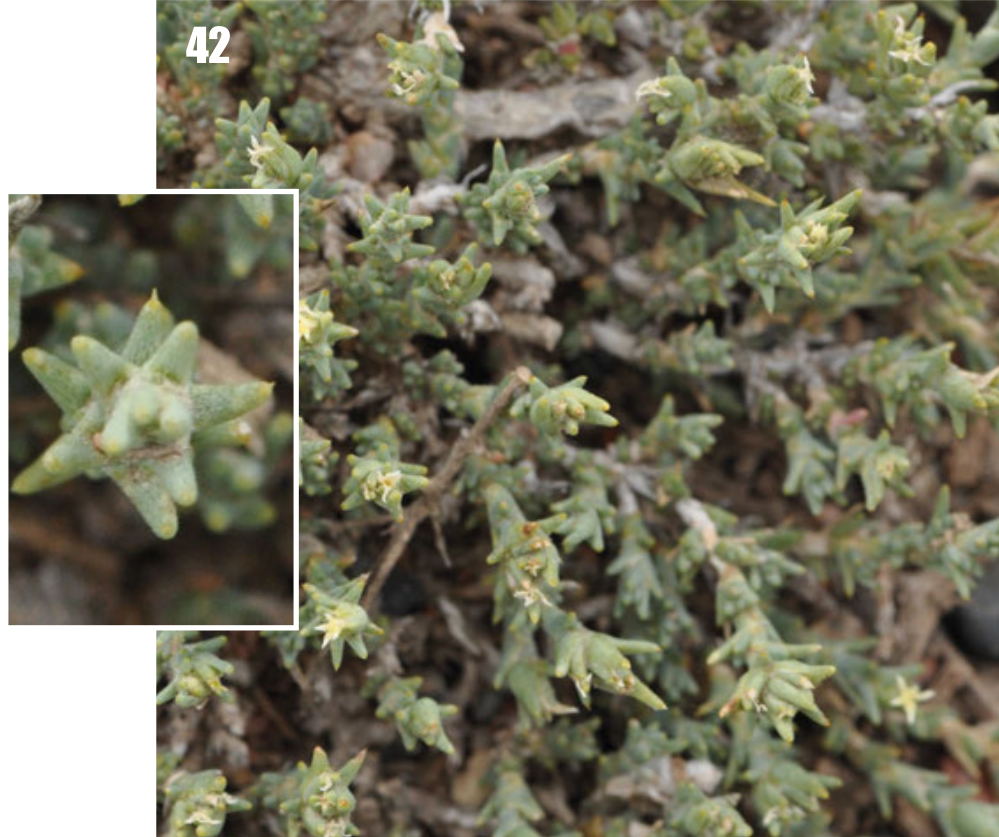
- Nanophyton erinaceum

Scientific classification
- Kingdom: Plantae
- Clade: Tracheophytes
- Clade: Angiosperms
- Clade: Eudicots
- Order: Caryophyllales
- Family: Amaranthaceae
- Genus: Nanophyton; Less.

= Nanophyton =

Genus of plants

Nanophyton is a genus of flowering plants belonging to the family Amaranthaceae.

Its native range is Southern European Russia to Mongolia.

== Species ==
Species:

- Nanophyton botschantzevii U.P.Pratov
- Nanophyton erinaceum (Pall.) Bunge
- Nanophyton grubovii U.P.Pratov
- Nanophyton iliense U.P.Pratov
- Nanophyton mongolicum U.P.Pratov
- Nanophyton narynense U.P.Pratov
- Nanophyton pulvinatum U.P.Pratov
- Nanophyton saxatile Botsch.
