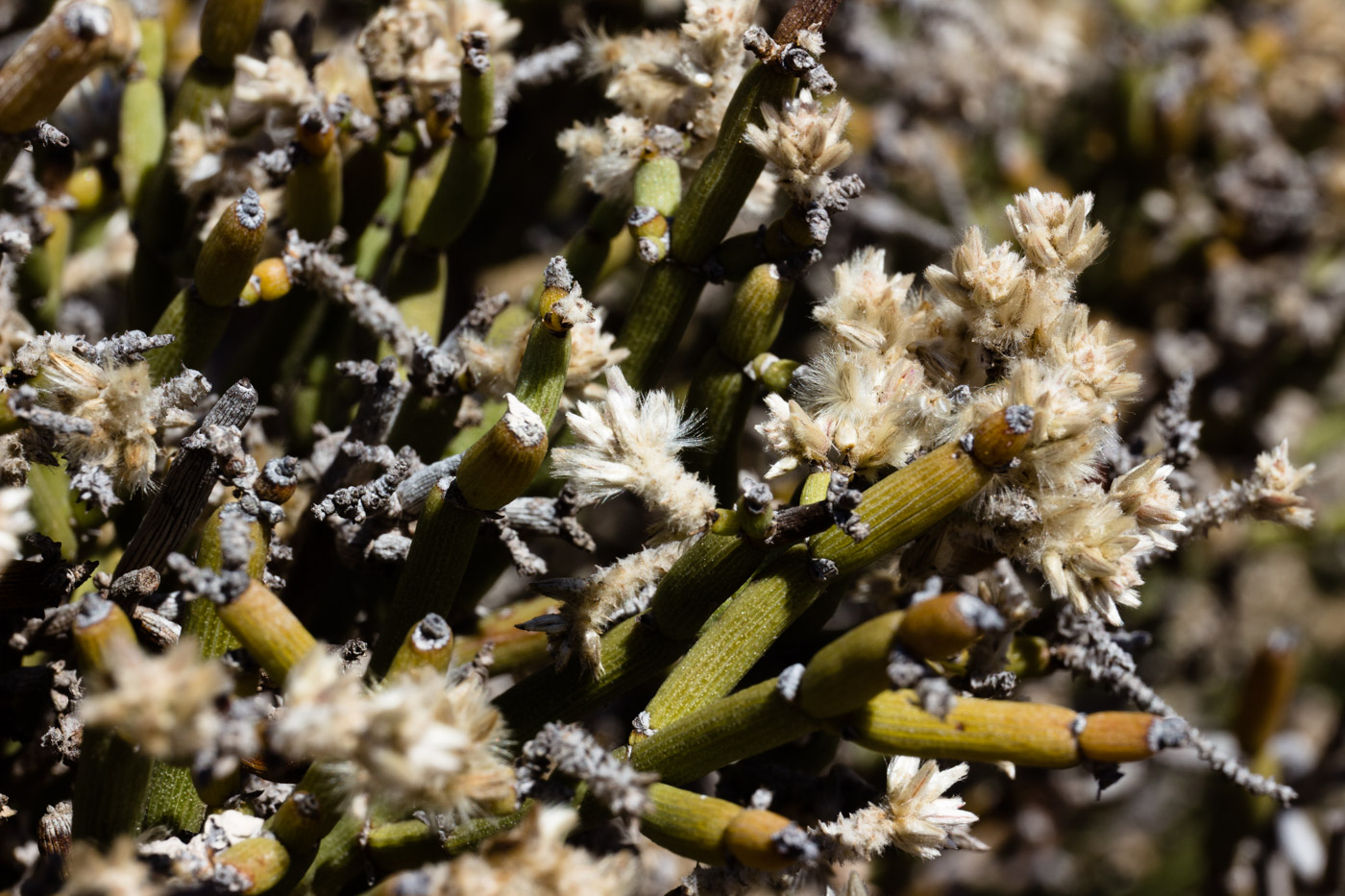

Scientific classification
- Kingdom: Plantae
- Clade: Tracheophytes
- Clade: Angiosperms
- Clade: Eudicots
- Order: Caryophyllales
- Family: Amaranthaceae
- Genus: Arthraerua (Kuntze) Schinz (1894)
- Species: A. leubnitziae

Binomial name
- Arthraerua leubnitziae (Kuntze) Schinz (1894)

Synonyms
- Aerva desertorum Engl. (1888); Aerva leubnitziae Kuntze (1889) (basionym); Ouret leubnitziae (Kuntze) Kuntze (1891)

= Arthraerua =

Arthraerua leubnitziae

Genus of flowering plants

Arthraerua is a genus of flowering plants belonging to the family Amaranthaceae. It is monotypic, being represented by the single species Arthraerua leubnitziae.

Its native range is Namibia.
