= Calicorema =

Scientific classification
- Kingdom: Plantae
- Clade: Tracheophytes
- Clade: Angiosperms
- Clade: Eudicots
- Order: Caryophyllales
- Family: Amaranthaceae
- Genus: Calicorema; Hook.f. (1880)

Genus of flowering plants

Calicorema is a genus of flowering plants belonging to the family Amaranthaceae.

Its native range is Namibia and the Cape Provinces of South Africa.

Species:

- Calicorema capitata (Moq.) Hook.f.
- Calicorema squarrosa (Schinz) Schinz
