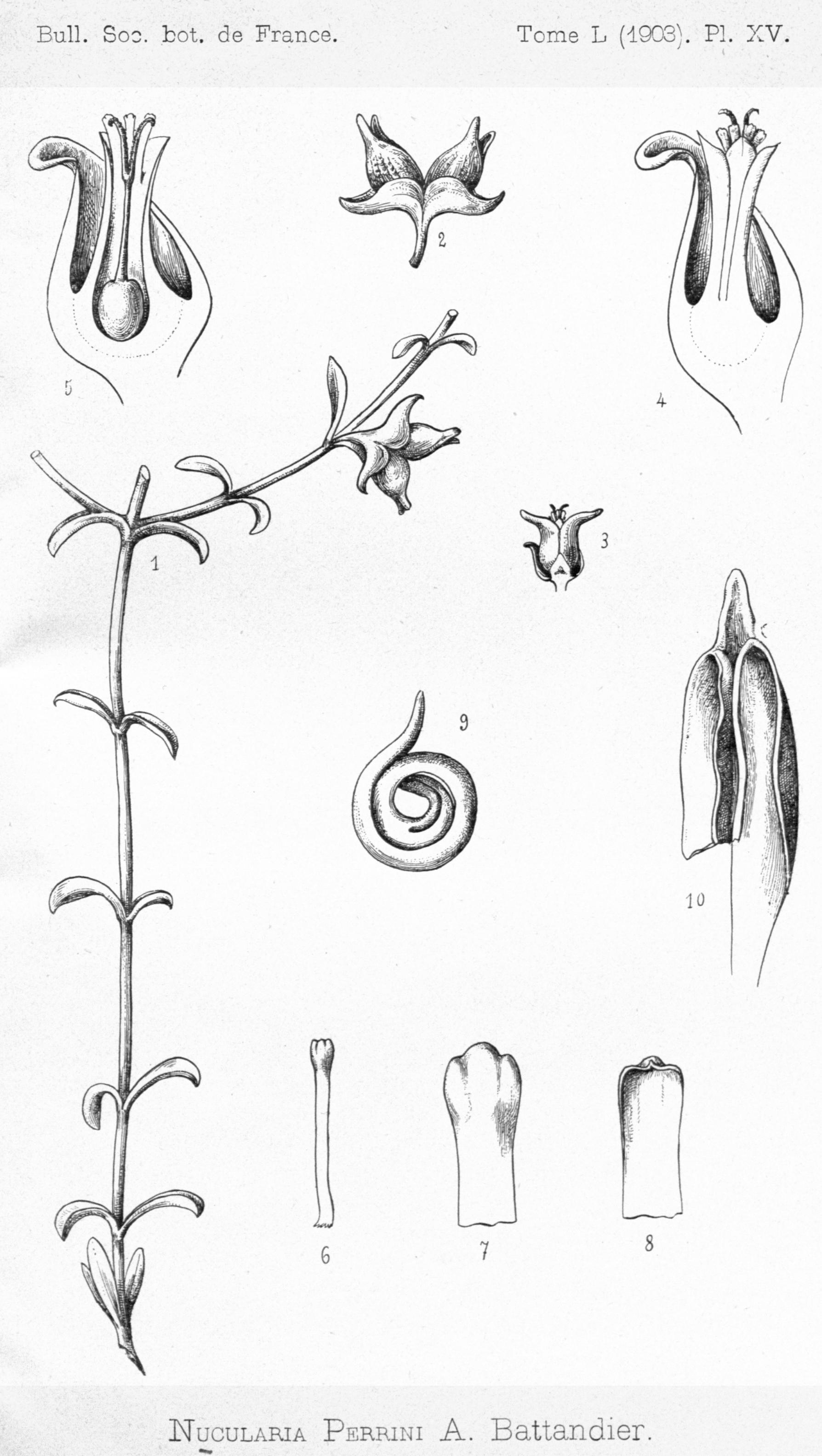
- Nucularia perrinii

Scientific classification
- Kingdom: Plantae
- Clade: Tracheophytes
- Clade: Angiosperms
- Clade: Eudicots
- Order: Caryophyllales
- Family: Amaranthaceae
- Genus: Nucularia; Batt. (1903)
- Species: N. perrinii

Binomial name
- Nucularia perrinii Batt. (1903)

= Nucularia =

Genus of flowering plants

Nucularia perrinii, known as askaf, is a species of flowering plant belonging to the family Amaranthaceae. It is the sole species in genus Nucularia. Its native range is Selvagens to the western and central Sahara and Sahel. Askaf is a crucial plant to Sahrawi camel nomads, providing salt and water to camels even during dry spells and causing a characteristic flavor to camel milk.

== Distribution ==
Nucularia perrinii is an endemic halophyte plant of central and western Sahara.
