= Halarchon =

Scientific classification
- Kingdom: Plantae
- Clade: Tracheophytes
- Clade: Angiosperms
- Clade: Eudicots
- Order: Caryophyllales
- Family: Amaranthaceae
- Genus: Halarchon; Bunge (1862)
- Species: H. vesiculosus

Binomial name
- Halarchon vesiculosus Bunge (1862)

Synonyms
- Halocharis vesiculosa Moq. (1849)

Genus of plants

Halarchon vesiculosus is a species of flowering plant belonging to the family Amaranthaceae. It is the sole species in genus Halarchon. It is an annual native to Afghanistan.
