= Traganopsis =

Scientific classification
- Kingdom: Plantae
- Clade: Tracheophytes
- Clade: Angiosperms
- Clade: Eudicots
- Order: Caryophyllales
- Family: Amaranthaceae
- Genus: Traganopsis; Maire & Wilczek (1936)
- Species: T. glomerata

Binomial name
- Traganopsis glomerata Maire & Wilczek (1936)

Genus of flowering plants

Traganopsis glomerata is a species of flowering plant belonging to the family Amaranthaceae. It is the sole species in genus Traganopsis. It is native to Morocco and Western Sahara.
