= Arthrophytum =

Scientific classification
- Kingdom: Plantae
- Clade: Tracheophytes
- Clade: Angiosperms
- Clade: Eudicots
- Order: Caryophyllales
- Family: Amaranthaceae
- Genus: Arthrophytum; Schrenk

Genus of flowering plants

Arthrophytum is a genus of flowering plants belonging to the family Amaranthaceae.

Its native range is Central Asia.

Species:

- Arthrophytum balchaschense (Iljin) Botsch.
- Arthrophytum betpakdalense Korovin & Mironov
- Arthrophytum iliense Iljin
- Arthrophytum korovinii Botsch.
- Arthrophytum lehmannianum Bunge
- Arthrophytum longibracteatum Korovin
- Arthrophytum pulvinatum Litv.
- Arthrophytum subulifolium Schrenk
