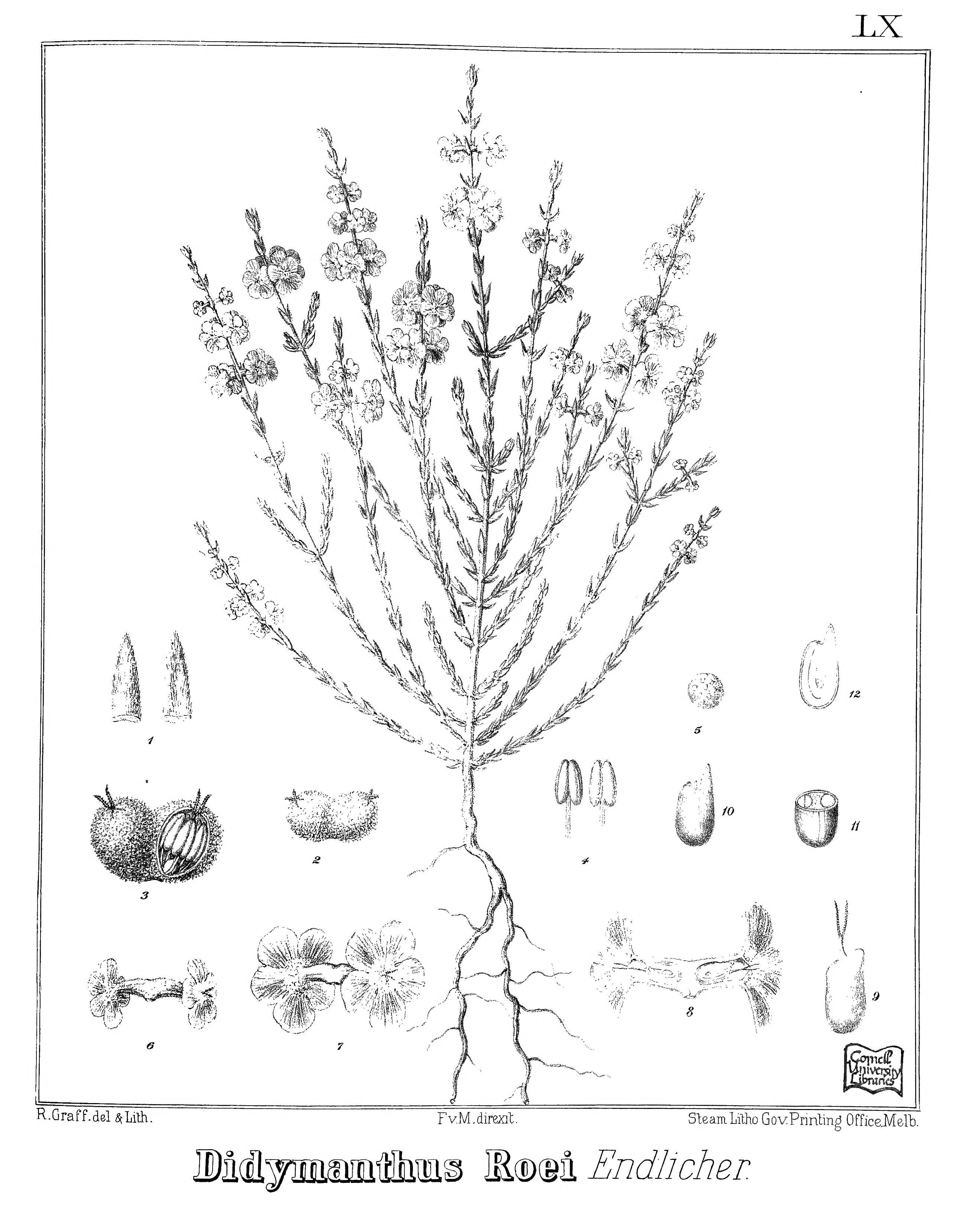
- Didymanthus

Scientific classification
- Kingdom: Plantae
- Clade: Tracheophytes
- Clade: Angiosperms
- Clade: Eudicots
- Order: Caryophyllales
- Family: Amaranthaceae
- Genus: Didymanthus; Endl. (1839)
- Species: D. roei

Binomial name
- Didymanthus roei Endl. (1839)

= Didymanthus =

Genus of plants

Didymanthus is a monotypic genus of flowering plants belonging to the family Amaranthaceae. The only species is Didymanthus roei.

Its native range is Southwestern Australia.
