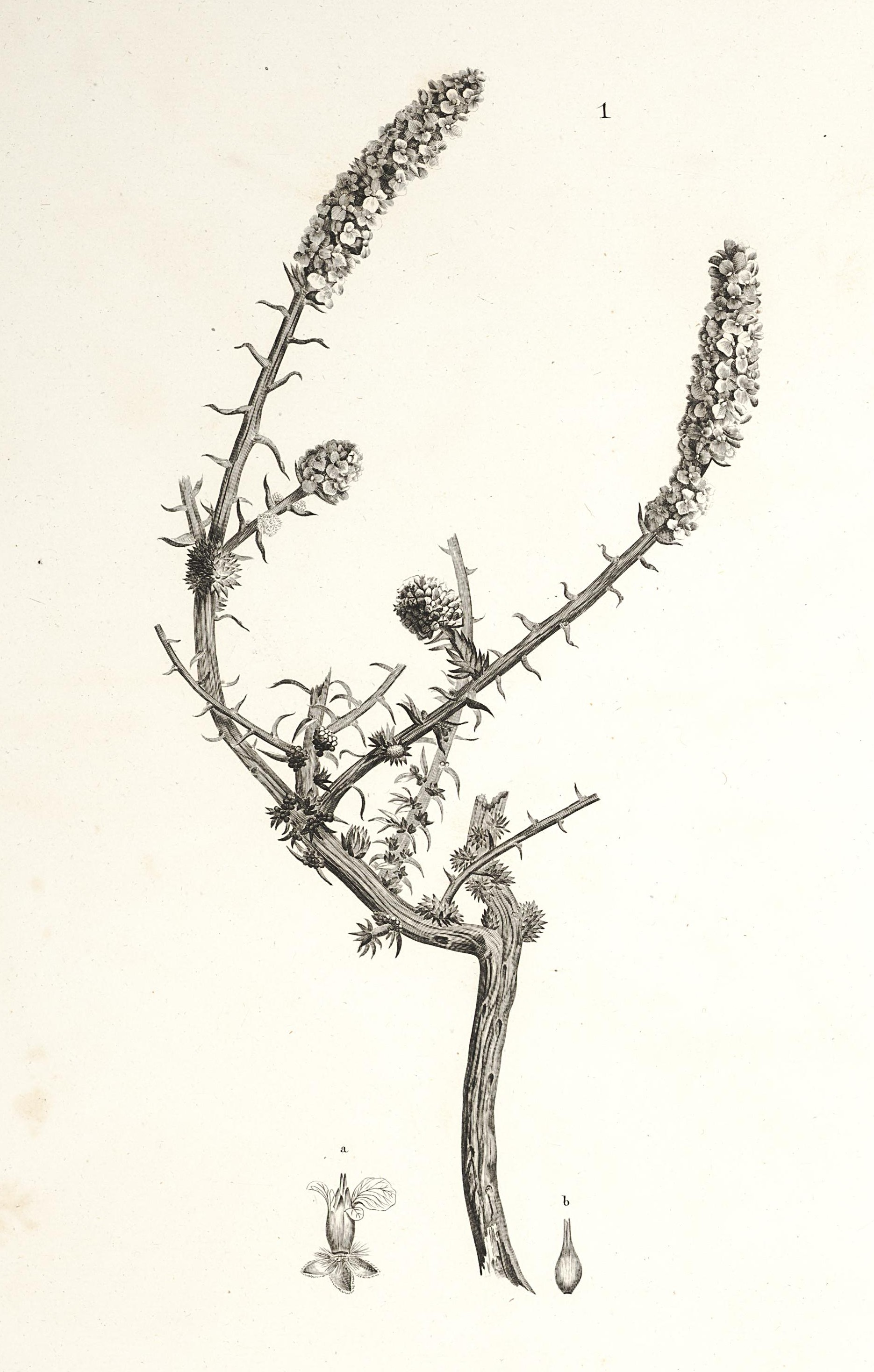
- Illustration from the protologue of the basionym, Agathophora alopecurioides

Scientific classification
- Kingdom: Plantae
- Clade: Tracheophytes
- Clade: Angiosperms
- Clade: Eudicots
- Order: Caryophyllales
- Family: Amaranthaceae
- Genus: Agathophora (Fenzl) Bunge (1862)
- Species: A. alopecuroides

Binomial name
- Agathophora alopecuroides (Delile) Fenzl ex Bunge (1862)

Synonyms
- Anabasis alopecuroides (Delile) Moq. (1849); Halogeton alopecuroides (Delile) Moq. (1840); Halogeton alopecuroides var. laevis Maire (1962), not validly publ.; Salsola alopecurioides Delile (1813)

= Agathophora =

Genus of flowering plants

Agathophora alopecuroides is a species of flowering plant belonging to the family Amaranthaceae. It is a subshrub or shrub native to northern Africa and west Asia, ranging from Morocco to Saudi Arabia and Pakistan. It is the sole species in genus Agathophora.
