= Allmaniopsis =

Scientific classification
- Kingdom: Plantae
- Clade: Tracheophytes
- Clade: Angiosperms
- Clade: Eudicots
- Order: Caryophyllales
- Family: Amaranthaceae
- Genus: Allmaniopsis; Suess. (1950)
- Species: A. fruticulosa

Binomial name
- Allmaniopsis fruticulosa Suess. (1950)

Genus of flowering plants

Allmaniopsis fruticulosa is a species of flowering plant belonging to the family Amaranthaceae. It is the sole species in genus Allmaniopsis. It is a subshrub endemic to eastern Kenya.
