= Neocentema =

Scientific classification
- Kingdom: Plantae
- Clade: Tracheophytes
- Clade: Angiosperms
- Clade: Eudicots
- Order: Caryophyllales
- Family: Amaranthaceae
- Genus: Neocentema; Schinz

Genus of plants

Neocentema is a genus of flowering plants belonging to the family Amaranthaceae.

Its native range is Somalia, Tanzania.

Species:

- Neocentema alternifolia (Schinz) Schinz
- Neocentema robecchii (Lopr.) Schinz
