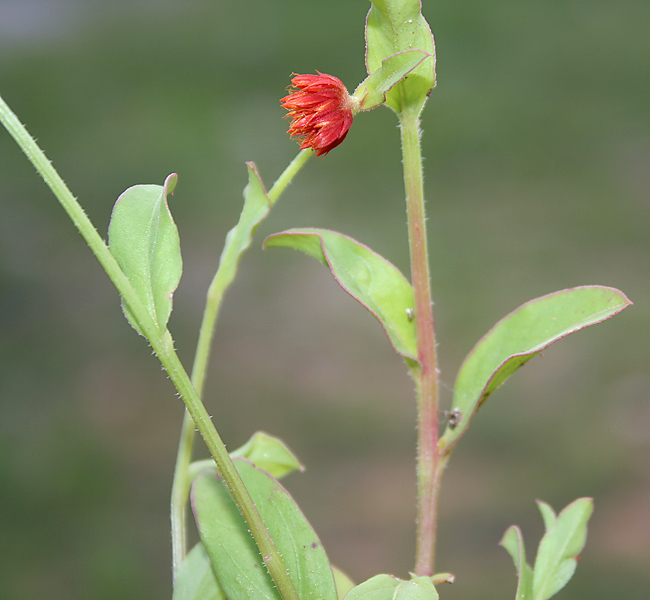
- Allmania nodiflora

Scientific classification
- Kingdom: Plantae
- Clade: Tracheophytes
- Clade: Angiosperms
- Clade: Eudicots
- Order: Caryophyllales
- Family: Amaranthaceae
- Genus: Allmania; R.Br. ex Wight

Species
- Allmania multiflora V.S.A.Kumar, V.Suresh, Sindhu Arya & Iamonico; Allmania nodiflora (L.) R.Br. ex Wight

= Allmania =

Genus of flowering plants

Allmania is a genus of flowering plants belonging to the family Amaranthaceae. Its native range is Southern China to Tropical Asia.

== Species ==
=== Allmania multiflora ===
Allmania multiflora is an annual herb. It is only the second species of this genus identified so far. It has been so named for having a higher number of florets within an inflorescence. The species was discovered during ongoing studies on Amaranthaceae, the plant family to which the genus Allmania belongs. it is distinct from Allmania nodiflora, which so far had been accepted as the lone Allmania species.

=== Allmania nodiflora ===
Allmania nodiflora (L.) R.Br. ex Wight
