= Hebanthodes =

Scientific classification
- Kingdom: Plantae
- Clade: Tracheophytes
- Clade: Angiosperms
- Clade: Eudicots
- Order: Caryophyllales
- Family: Amaranthaceae
- Genus: Hebanthodes; Pedersen (2000)
- Species: H. peruviana

Binomial name
- Hebanthodes peruviana Pedersen (2000)

Genus of plants

Hebanthodes is a monotypic genus of flowering plants belonging to the family Amaranthaceae. The only species is Hebanthodes peruviana.

Its native range is Peru.
