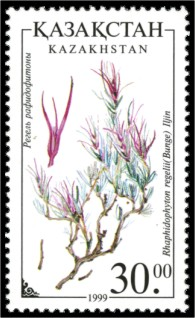

Scientific classification
- Kingdom: Plantae
- Clade: Tracheophytes
- Clade: Angiosperms
- Clade: Eudicots
- Order: Caryophyllales
- Family: Amaranthaceae
- Genus: Rhaphidophyton; Iljin (1937)
- Species: R. regelii

Binomial name
- Rhaphidophyton regelii (Bunge) Iljin (1936)

Synonyms
- Noaea regelii Bunge (1879)

= Rhaphidophyton =

Genus of plants

Rhaphidophyton is a monotypic genus of flowering plants belonging to the family Amaranthaceae. The only species is Rhaphidophyton regelii.

Its native range is Kazakhstan and Kyrgyzstan in Central Asia.
