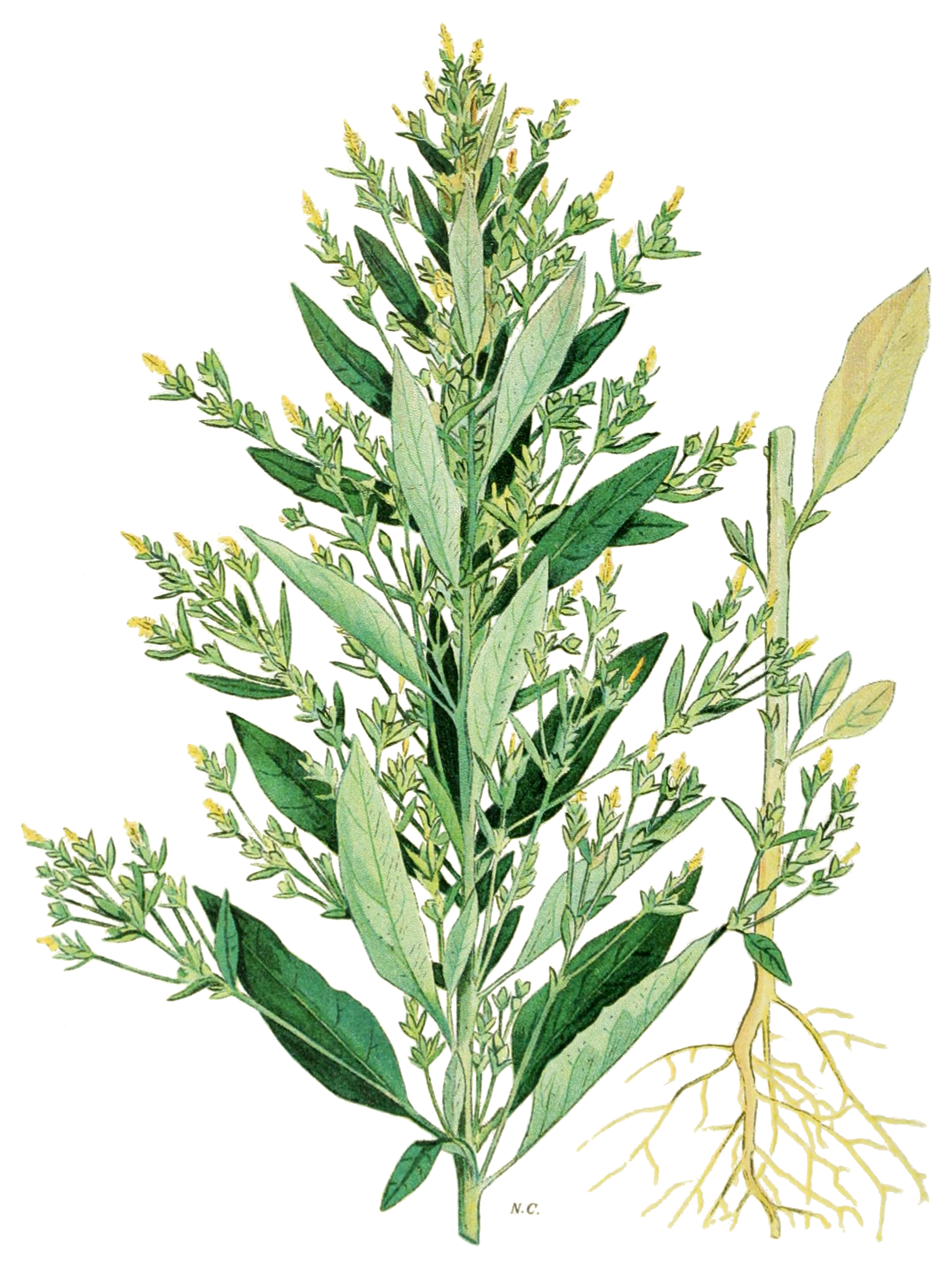
- Axyris amaranthoides botanical illustration

Scientific classification
- Kingdom: Plantae
- Clade: Embryophytes
- Clade: Tracheophytes
- Clade: Angiosperms
- Clade: Eudicots
- Order: Caryophyllales
- Family: Amaranthaceae
- Subfamily: Chenopodioideae
- Tribe: Axyrideae
- Genus: Axyris; L.

Species
- See text

Synonyms
- Diotis Schreb.; Eurotia Adans.; Gueldenstaedtia Neck.

= Axyris =

Genus of flowering plants

Axyris, the Russian pigweeds, are a genus of flowering plants in the amaranth family Amaranthaceae, native to temperate parts of Eastern Europe and Asia. The center of genetic diversity is the Altai to northern Tien-Shan mountains. The best known species is Axyris amaranthoides, which has become a widespread invasive in northern North America.

== Species ==
Currently accepted species include:

- Axyris amaranthoides L.
- Axyris caucasica (Sommier & Levier) Lipsky
- Axyris hybrida L.
- Axyris koreana Nakai
- Axyris mira Sukhor.
- Axyris prostrata L.
- Axyris sphaerosperma Fisch. & C.A.Mey.
