= Halanthium =

Scientific classification
- Kingdom: Plantae
- Clade: Tracheophytes
- Clade: Angiosperms
- Clade: Eudicots
- Order: Caryophyllales
- Family: Amaranthaceae
- Genus: Halanthium; K.Koch (1844)

Species
- Halanthium alaeflavum Assadi; Halanthium kulpianum (K.Koch) Bunge; Halanthium mamamense Bunge; Halanthium purpureum (Moq.) Bunge; Halanthium rarifolium K.Koch

Synonyms
- Physogeton Jaub. & Spach (1845)

Genus of flowering plants

Halanthium is a genus of flowering plants in the amaranth family, Amaranthaceae. It includes five species of annuals native to western Asia, ranging from Turkey to the Caucasus, Iraq, and Iran.

== Species ==
Five species are accepted.

- Halanthium alaeflavum Assadi – northwestern Iran
- Halanthium kulpianum (K.Koch) Bunge – Turkey and the Caucasus
- Halanthium mamamense Bunge – northwestern Iran
- Halanthium purpureum (Moq.) Bunge – Iraq and Iran
- Halanthium rarifolium K.Koch – Turkey, the Caucasus, and Iran
