= Kaviria =

Scientific classification
- Kingdom: Plantae
- Clade: Tracheophytes
- Clade: Angiosperms
- Clade: Eudicots
- Order: Caryophyllales
- Family: Amaranthaceae
- Genus: Kaviria; Akhani & Roalson

Genus of plants

Kaviria is a genus of flowering plants belonging to the family Amaranthaceae.

Its native range is Somalia to Arabian Peninsula, Syria to Central Asia and Pakistan.

Species:

- Kaviria aucheri (Moq.) Akhani
- Kaviria azaurena (Mouterde) Sukhor.
- Kaviria gossypina (Bunge ex Boiss.) Akhani
- Kaviria lachnantha (Botsch.) Akhani
- Kaviria pycnophylla (Brenan) Akhani
- Kaviria rubescens (Franch.) Akhani
- Kaviria tomentosa (Moq.) Akhani
- Kaviria vvedenskyi (Iljin & Popov) Akhani
- Kaviria zehzadii (Akhani) Akhani
