= Pseudoplantago =

Scientific classification
- Kingdom: Plantae
- Clade: Tracheophytes
- Clade: Angiosperms
- Clade: Eudicots
- Order: Caryophyllales
- Family: Amaranthaceae
- Genus: Pseudoplantago; Suess.

Genus of plants

Pseudoplantago is a genus of flowering plants belonging to the family Amaranthaceae.

Its native range is Venezuela, Southern Brazil to Northeastern Argentina.

Species:

- Pseudoplantago bisteriliflora C.C.Towns.
- Pseudoplantago friesii Suess.
