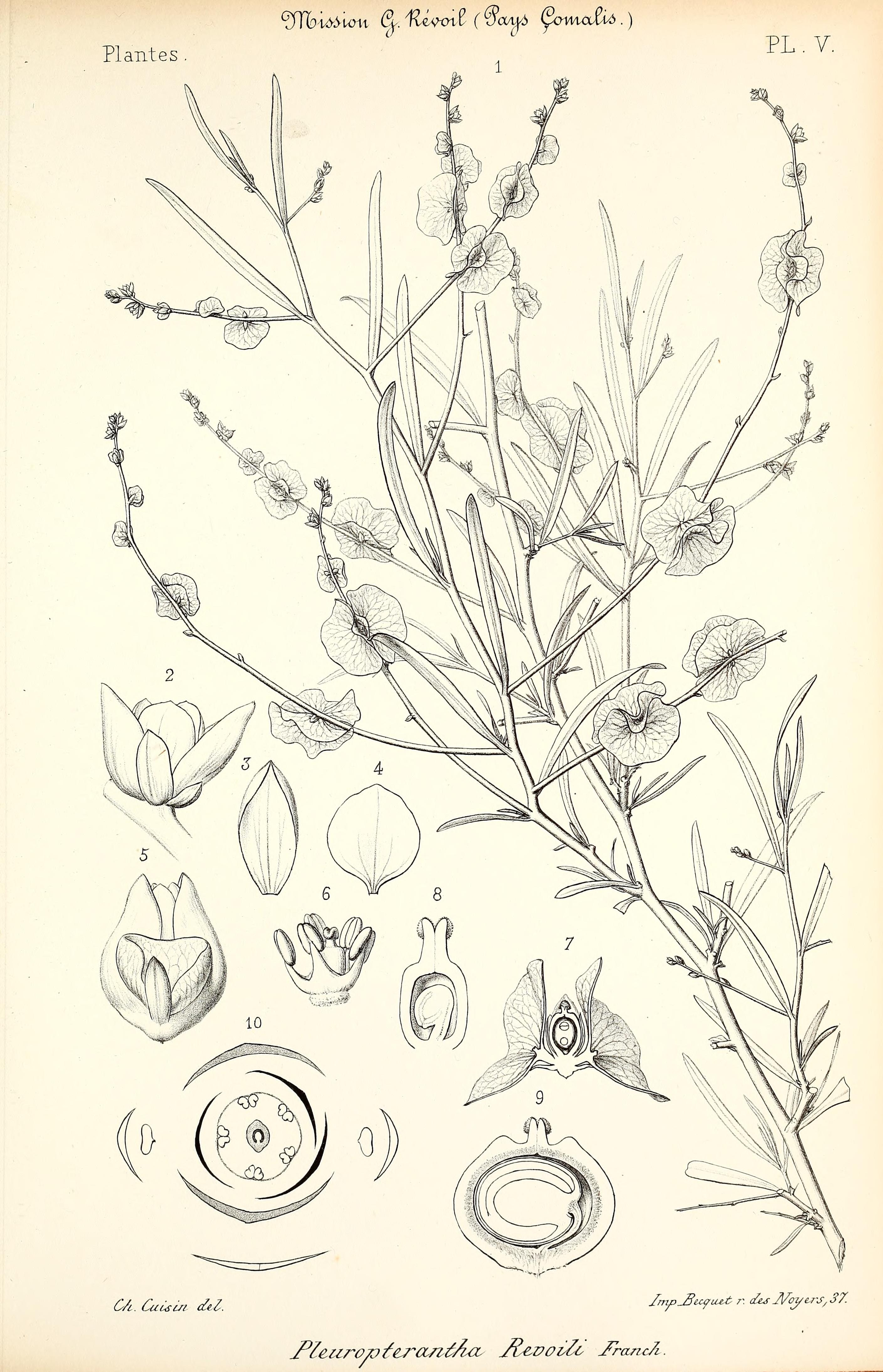
- Faune et flore des pays Çomalis (Afrique orientale) (Plate V)

Scientific classification
- Kingdom: Plantae
- Clade: Tracheophytes
- Clade: Angiosperms
- Clade: Eudicots
- Order: Caryophyllales
- Family: Amaranthaceae
- Genus: Pleuropterantha; Franch.

= Pleuropterantha =

Genus of plants

Pleuropterantha is a genus of flowering plants belonging to the family Amaranthaceae.

Its native range is Northeastern Tropical Africa.

Species:

- Pleuropterantha revoilii Franch.
- Pleuropterantha thulinii C.C.Towns.
- Pleuropterantha undulatifolia Chiov.
