= Siamosia =

Scientific classification
- Kingdom: Plantae
- Clade: Tracheophytes
- Clade: Angiosperms
- Clade: Eudicots
- Order: Caryophyllales
- Family: Amaranthaceae
- Subfamily: Amaranthoideae
- Genus: Siamosia; K.Larsen & T.Myndel Pedersen (1987)
- Species: S. thailandica

Binomial name
- Siamosia thailandica K.Larsen & T.Myndel Pedersen (1987)

Genus of flowering plants

Siamosia thailandica is a species of flowering plant in the amaranth family, Amaranthaceae. It is the sole species in genus Siamosia. It is endemic to Thailand.
