= Centema =

Scientific classification
- Kingdom: Plantae
- Clade: Tracheophytes
- Clade: Angiosperms
- Clade: Eudicots
- Order: Caryophyllales
- Family: Amaranthaceae
- Genus: Centema; Hook.f. (1880)

Synonyms
- Pseudocentema Chiov. (1932)

Genus of flowering plants

Centema is a genus of flowering plants belonging to the family Amaranthaceae.

Its native range is Angola, Mozambique, Eswatini, and KwaZulu-Natal and the Northern Provinces of South Africa.

Species:

- Centema angolensis Hook.f.
- Centema subfusca (Moq.) T.Cooke
