= Centrostachys =

Scientific classification
- Kingdom: Plantae
- Clade: Tracheophytes
- Clade: Angiosperms
- Clade: Eudicots
- Order: Caryophyllales
- Family: Amaranthaceae
- Genus: Centrostachys; Wall. (1824)
- Species: C. aquatica

Binomial name
- Centrostachys aquatica (R.Br.) Moq. (1849)

Synonyms
- Achyranthes aquatica R.Br. (1810) (basionym); Achyranthes natans Buch.-Ham. ex Wall. (1832), not validly publ.; Achyranthes trichotoma Perr. ex Moq. (1849); Celosia spinescens Russell ex Wall. (1832), nom. nud.; Centrostachys flabelligera Fenzl ex Moq. (1849)

Genus of flowering plants

Centrostachys aquatica is a species of flowering plants belonging to the family Amaranthaceae. It is the sole species in genus Centrostachys. It is a subshrub or helophyte native to tropical Africa south to Botswana, and to the Indian subcontinent, Indochina, southeastern China, and Java.
