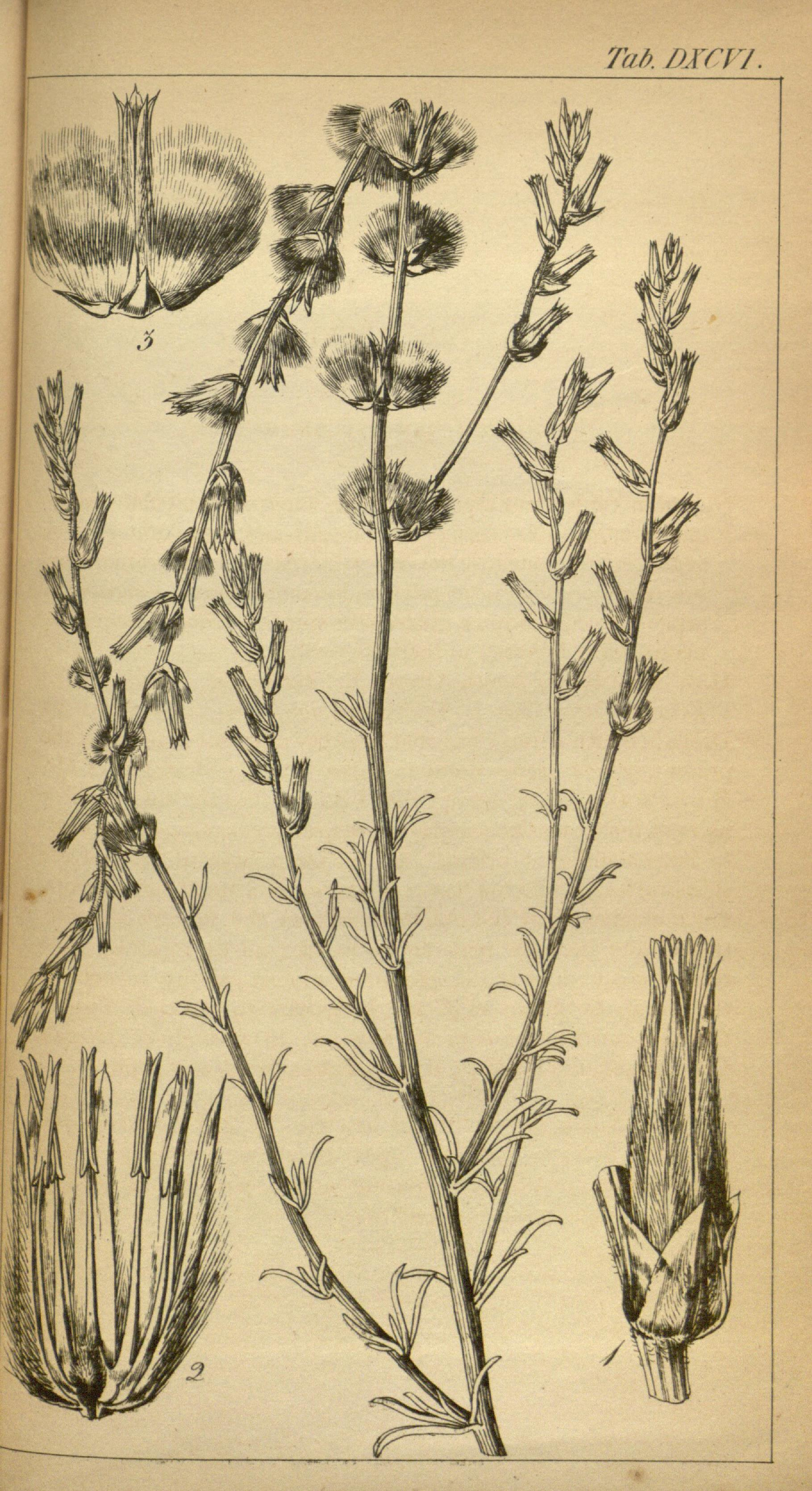
- Sericorema remotiflora as Trichinium remotiflorum

Scientific classification
- Kingdom: Plantae
- Clade: Tracheophytes
- Clade: Angiosperms
- Clade: Eudicots
- Order: Caryophyllales
- Family: Amaranthaceae
- Genus: Sericorema; Lopr.

= Sericorema =

Genus of plants

Sericorema is a genus of flowering plants belonging to the family Amaranthaceae.

Its native range is Southern Tropical and Southern Africa.

== Species ==
Species:

- Sericorema remotiflora (Hook.) Lopr.
- Sericorema sericea (Schinz) Lopr.
