= Rosifax =

Scientific classification
- Kingdom: Plantae
- Clade: Tracheophytes
- Clade: Angiosperms
- Clade: Eudicots
- Order: Caryophyllales
- Family: Amaranthaceae
- Genus: Rosifax; C.C.Towns. (1991)
- Species: R. sabuletorum

Binomial name
- Rosifax sabuletorum C.C.Towns. (1991)

Genus of plants

Rosifax is a monotypic genus of flowering plants belonging to the family Amaranthaceae. The only species is Rosifax sabuletorum.

Its native range is Somalia.
