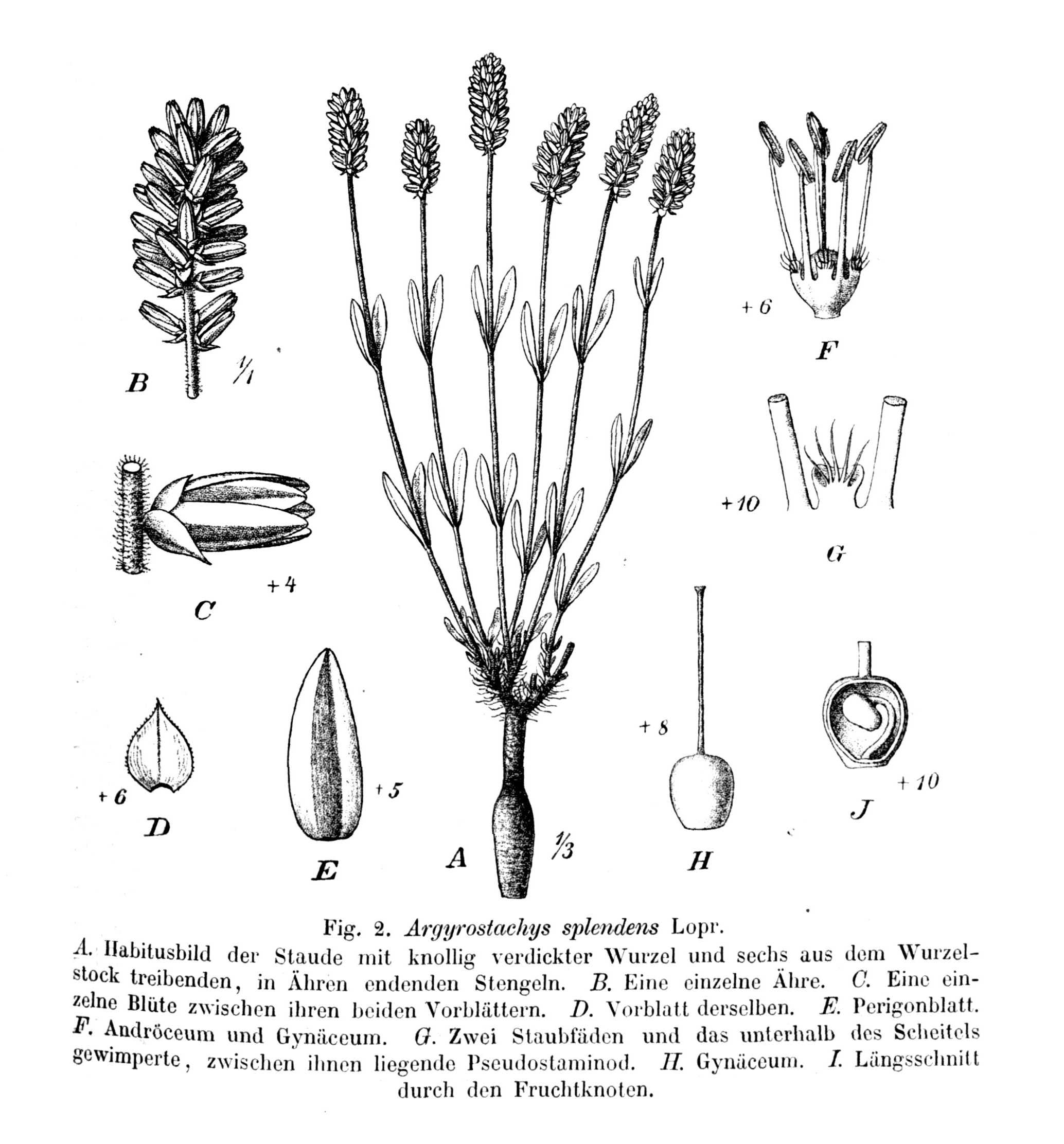
- Pandiaka carsonii as Argyrostachys splendens.

Scientific classification
- Kingdom: Plantae
- Clade: Tracheophytes
- Clade: Angiosperms
- Clade: Eudicots
- Order: Caryophyllales
- Family: Amaranthaceae
- Genus: Pandiaka; Benth. & Hook.f.

= Pandiaka =

Genus of plants

Pandiaka is a genus of flowering plants belonging to the family Amaranthaceae.

Its native range is Tropical Africa to Namibia.

== Species ==
Species:

- Pandiaka angustifolia (Vahl) Hepper
- Pandiaka carsonii (Baker) C.B.Clarke
- Pandiaka confusa C.C.Towns.
- Pandiaka elegantissima (Schinz) Dandy
- Pandiaka involucrata (Moq.) B.D.Jacks.
- Pandiaka metallorum P.A.Duvign. & Van Bockstal
- Pandiaka porphyrargyrea Suess. & Overkott
- Pandiaka ramulosa Hiern
- Pandiaka richardsiae Suess.
- Pandiaka rubrolutea (Lopr.) C.C.Towns.
- Pandiaka trichinioides Suess.
- Pandiaka welwitschii (Schinz) Hiern
