= Polyrhabda =

Scientific classification
- Kingdom: Plantae
- Clade: Tracheophytes
- Clade: Angiosperms
- Clade: Eudicots
- Order: Caryophyllales
- Family: Amaranthaceae
- Genus: Polyrhabda; C.C.Towns. (1984)
- Species: P. atriplicifolia

Binomial name
- Polyrhabda atriplicifolia C.C.Towns. (1984)

Genus of flowering plants

Polyrhabda atriplicifolia is a species of flowering plant belonging to the family Amaranthaceae.it is the sole species in genus Polyrhabda. It is a subshrub endemic to Somalia, where it grows in deserts and dry shrublands.
