= Omegandra =

Scientific classification
- Kingdom: Plantae
- Clade: Tracheophytes
- Clade: Angiosperms
- Clade: Eudicots
- Order: Caryophyllales
- Family: Amaranthaceae
- Genus: Omegandra; G.J.Leach & C.C.Towns. (1993)
- Species: O. kanisii

Binomial name
- Omegandra kanisii G.J.Leach & C.C.Towns. (1993)

Genus of plants

Omegandra is a monotypic genus of flowering plants belonging to the family Amaranthaceae. The only species is Omegandra kanisii.

Its native range is Northern Australia.
