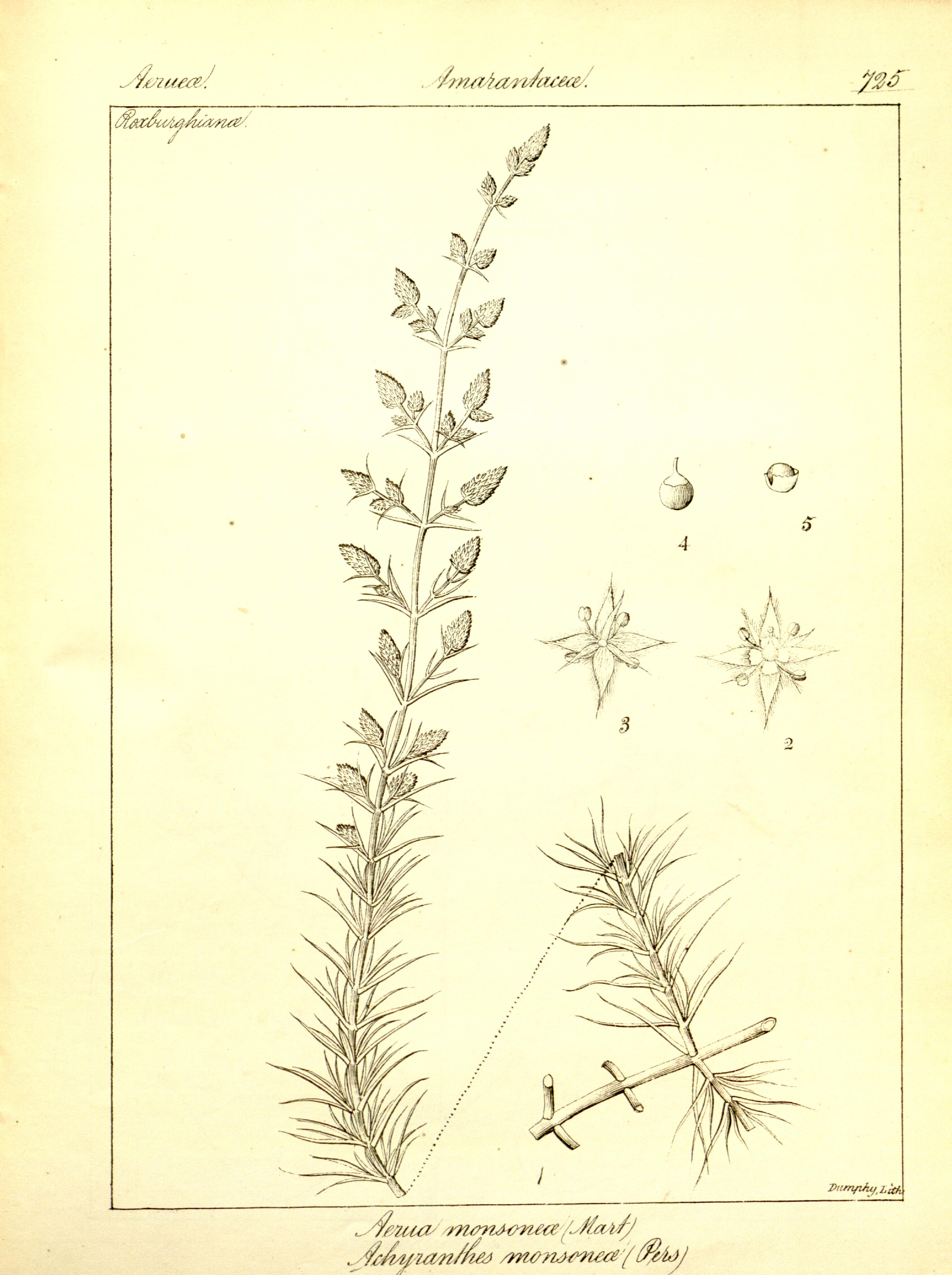
- Trichuriella monsoniae

Scientific classification
- Kingdom: Plantae
- Clade: Tracheophytes
- Clade: Angiosperms
- Clade: Eudicots
- Order: Caryophyllales
- Family: Amaranthaceae
- Genus: Trichuriella; Bennet (1985)
- Species: T. monsoniae

Binomial name
- Trichuriella monsoniae (L.f.) Bennet (1985)

Synonyms
- Trichurus C.C.Towns. (1974), non Clements (1896).; Achyranthes monsoniae (L.f.) Pers. (1805); Ouret monsoniae (L.f.) Kuntze (1891); Trichurus monsoniae (L.f.) C.C.Towns. (1974); Illecebrum monsoniae L.f. (1782) (basionym); Achyranthes pungens Lam. (1785); Achyranthes setacea Roth (1819); Aerva monsonia (Retz.) Mart. (1825); Aerva setacea Mart. (1825); Celosia monsonia Retz. (1781)

= Trichuriella =

Genus of flowering plants

Trichuriella monsoniae is a species of flowering plant belonging to the family Amaranthaceae. It is the sole species in genus Trichuriella. It is a subshrub native to the Indian subcontinent, Indo-China, and Hainan.
