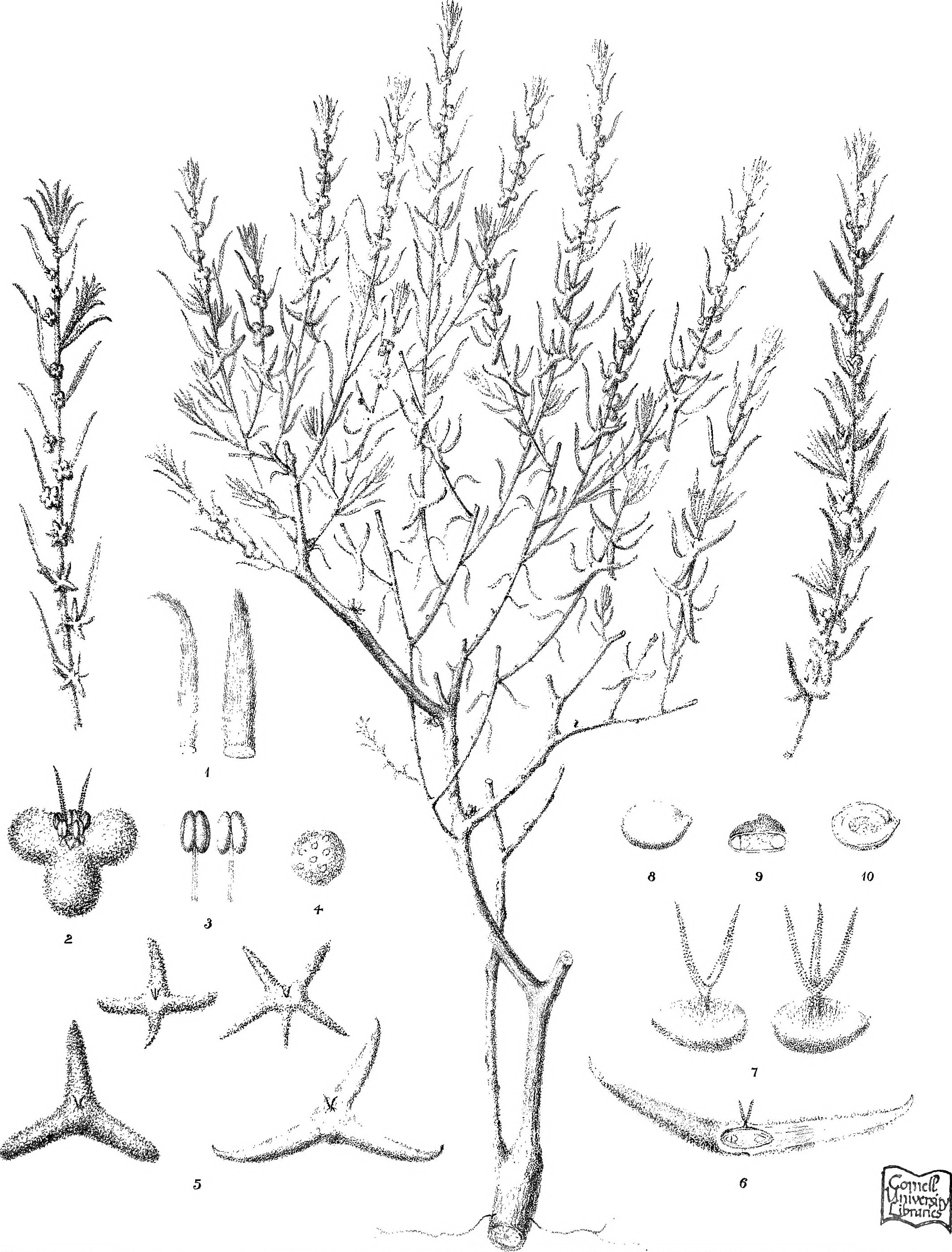
- Iconography of Australian salsolaceous plants (1889)

Scientific classification
- Kingdom: Plantae
- Clade: Tracheophytes
- Clade: Angiosperms
- Clade: Eudicots
- Order: Caryophyllales
- Family: Amaranthaceae
- Genus: Malacocera; R.H.Anderson

= Malacocera =

Genus of plants

Malacocera is a genus of flowering plants belonging to the family Amaranthaceae from the major group named Angiosperms.

Its native range is Australia.

== Species ==
Species:

- Malacocera albolanata (Ising) Chinnock
- Malacocera biflora Ising
- Malacocera gracilis Chinnock
- Malacocera tricornis (Benth.) R.H.Anderson
