= Eriostylos =

Scientific classification
- Kingdom: Plantae
- Clade: Tracheophytes
- Clade: Angiosperms
- Clade: Eudicots
- Order: Caryophyllales
- Family: Amaranthaceae
- Genus: Eriostylos; C.C.Towns. (1979)
- Species: E. stefaninii

Binomial name
- Eriostylos stefaninii (Chiov.) C.C.Towns. (1979)

Synonyms
- Centema stefaninii Chiov. (1916)

Genus of plants

Eriostylos is a monotypic genus of flowering plants belonging to the family Amaranthaceae. The only species is Eriostylos stefaninii. It is endemic to Somalia.
