= Baolia =

Scientific classification
- Kingdom: Plantae
- Clade: Tracheophytes
- Clade: Angiosperms
- Clade: Eudicots
- Order: Caryophyllales
- Family: Amaranthaceae
- Genus: Baolia; H.W.Kung & G.L.Chu (1978)
- Species: B. bracteata

Binomial name
- Baolia bracteata H.W.Kung & G.L.Chu (1978)

Genus of flowering plants

Baolia bracteata is a species of flowering plant belonging to the family Amaranthaceae. It is the sole species in genus Baolia. It is an annual plant endemic to southern Gansu province in north-central China.
