= Chenolea =

Scientific classification
- Kingdom: Plantae
- Clade: Tracheophytes
- Clade: Angiosperms
- Clade: Eudicots
- Order: Caryophyllales
- Family: Amaranthaceae
- Genus: Chenolea; Thunb.

Genus of flowering plants

Chenolea is a genus of flowering plants belonging to the family Amaranthaceae.

Its native range is Southern Africa.

Species:

- Chenolea convallis Snijman & J.C.Manning
- Chenolea diffusa Thunb.
