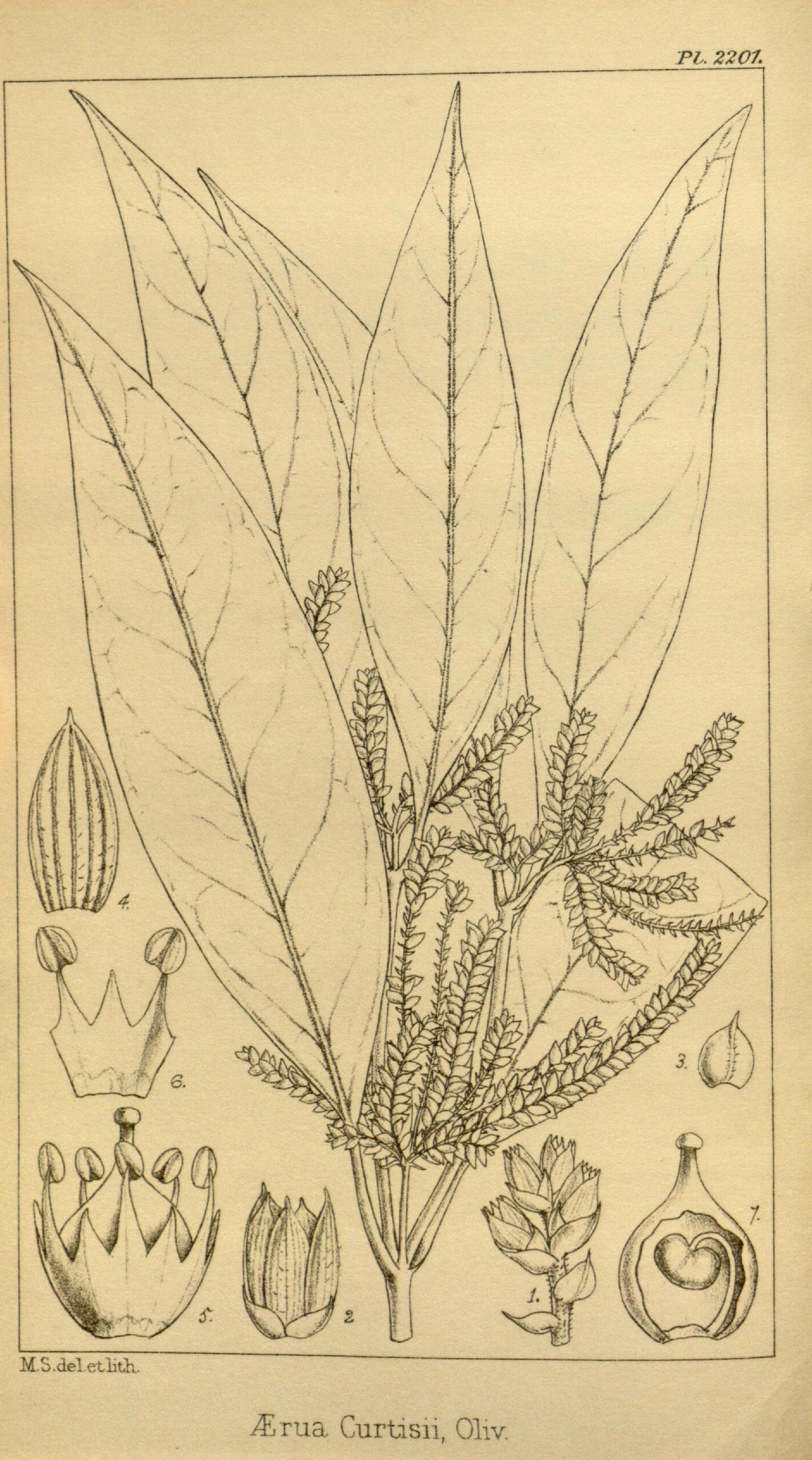
- An illustration of Psilotrichopsis curtisii

Scientific classification
- Kingdom: Plantae
- Clade: Embryophytes
- Clade: Tracheophytes
- Clade: Spermatophytes
- Clade: Angiosperms
- Clade: Eudicots
- Order: Caryophyllales
- Family: Amaranthaceae
- Genus: Psilotrichopsis; C.C.Towns. (1974)
- Species: P. curtisii

Binomial name
- Psilotrichopsis curtisii (Oliv.) C.C.Towns. (1974)

Synonyms
- Aerva curtisii Oliv. (1892)

= Psilotrichopsis =

Genus of plants

Psilotrichopsis is a monotypic genus of flowering plants belonging to the family Amaranthaceae. The only species is Psilotrichopsis curtisii.

It is native to Hainan, Vietnam, Thailand, and Peninsular Malaysia.
