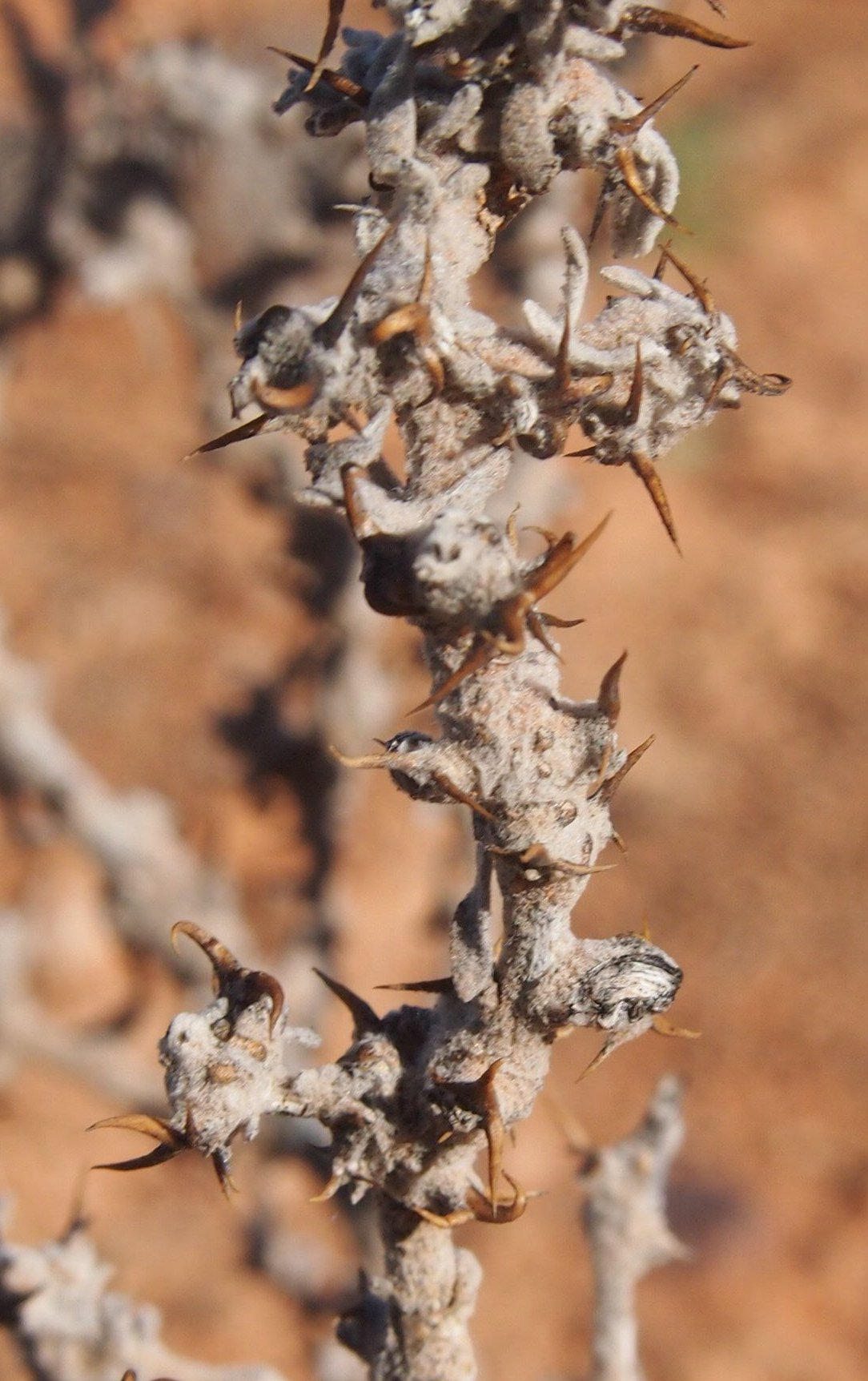

Scientific classification
- Kingdom: Plantae
- Clade: Tracheophytes
- Clade: Angiosperms
- Clade: Eudicots
- Order: Caryophyllales
- Family: Amaranthaceae
- Genus: Eremophea; Paul G.Wilson

= Eremophea =

Genus of plants

Eremophea is a genus of flowering plants belonging to the family Amaranthaceae.

Its native range is Australia.

Species:

- Eremophea aggregata Paul G.Wilson
- Eremophea spinosa (Ewart & O.B.Davies) Paul G.Wilson
