= Halocharis (plant) =

Scientific classification
- Kingdom: Plantae
- Clade: Tracheophytes
- Clade: Angiosperms
- Clade: Eudicots
- Order: Caryophyllales
- Family: Amaranthaceae
- Genus: Halocharis; Moq.

Genus of plants

Halocharis is a genus of flowering plants belonging to the family Amaranthaceae.

Its native range is Iraq to Central Asia and Pakistan, Arabian Peninsula.

Species:

- Halocharis brachyura Eig
- Halocharis clavata Bunge
- Halocharis hispida (Schrenk) Bunge
- Halocharis lachnantha Korovin
- Halocharis sulphurea (Moq.) Moq.
- Halocharis violacea Bunge
