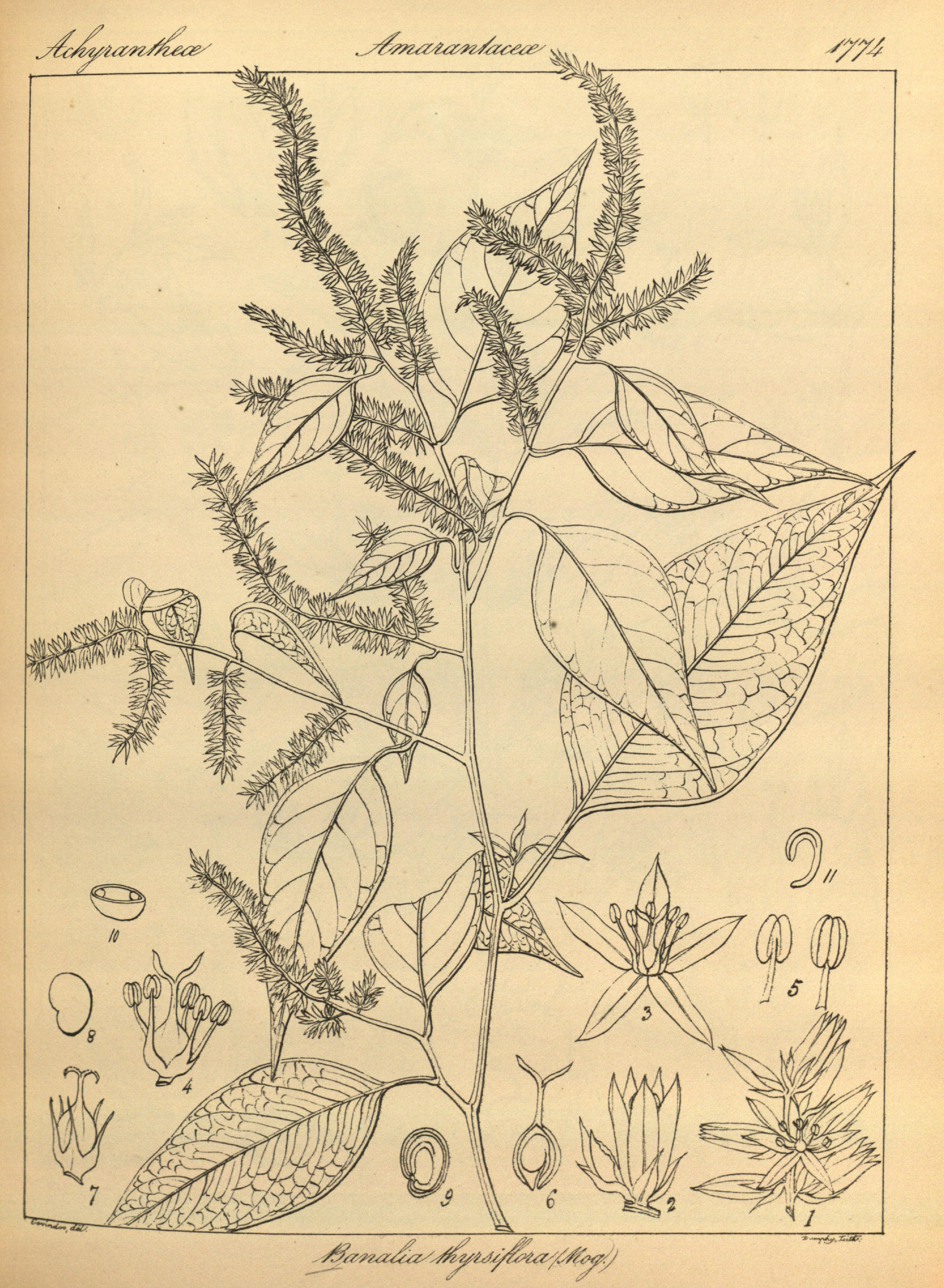

Scientific classification
- Kingdom: Plantae
- Clade: Tracheophytes
- Clade: Angiosperms
- Clade: Eudicots
- Order: Caryophyllales
- Family: Amaranthaceae
- Genus: Indobanalia; A.N.Henry & B.Roy (1969)
- Species: I. thyrsiflora

Binomial name
- Indobanalia thyrsiflora (Moq.) A.N.Henry & B.Roy (1969)

Synonyms
- Banalia Moq. (1849), nom. illeg.; Banalia thyrsiflora Moq. (1849); Achyranthes polygonata B.Heyne ex Wall. (1832), not validly publ.; Achyranthes thyrsiflora B.Heyne ex Wall. (1832), not validly publ.; Celosia missionis Wall. (1832), nom. nud.; Celosia thyrsiflora Wall. (1832), not validly publ.

= Indobanalia =

Genus of plants

Indobanalia is a monotypic genus of flowering plants belonging to the family Amaranthaceae. The only species is Indobanalia thyrsiflora.

Its native range is India.
