= Nyssanthes =

Scientific classification
- Kingdom: Plantae
- Clade: Tracheophytes
- Clade: Angiosperms
- Clade: Eudicots
- Order: Caryophyllales
- Family: Amaranthaceae
- Genus: Nyssanthes; R.Br.

Genus of plants

Nyssanthes is a genus of flowering plants belonging to the family Amaranthaceae.

Its native range is Eastern Australia.

Species:

- Nyssanthes diffusa R.Br.
- Nyssanthes erecta R.Br.
- Nyssanthes impervia A.R.Bean
- Nyssanthes longistyla C.H.Mill.
