= Sericostachys =

Scientific classification
- Kingdom: Plantae
- Clade: Tracheophytes
- Clade: Angiosperms
- Clade: Eudicots
- Order: Caryophyllales
- Family: Amaranthaceae
- Genus: Sericostachys; Gilg & Lopr.

Genus of plants

Sericostachys is a genus of flowering plants belonging to the family Amaranthaceae.

Its native range is Tropical Africa.

== Species ==
Species:

- Sericostachys scandens Gilg & Lopr.
- Sericostachys tomentosa Lopr.
