= Lecosia =

Scientific classification
- Kingdom: Plantae
- Clade: Tracheophytes
- Clade: Angiosperms
- Clade: Eudicots
- Order: Caryophyllales
- Family: Amaranthaceae
- Genus: Lecosia; Pedersen

Genus of plants

Lecosia is a genus of flowering plants belonging to the family Amaranthaceae.

Its native range is Eastern Brazil.

Species:

- Lecosia formicarum Pedersen
- Lecosia oppositifolia Pedersen
