= Piptoptera =

Scientific classification
- Kingdom: Plantae
- Clade: Tracheophytes
- Clade: Angiosperms
- Clade: Eudicots
- Order: Caryophyllales
- Family: Amaranthaceae
- Genus: Piptoptera; Bunge (1877)
- Species: P. turkestana

Binomial name
- Piptoptera turkestana Bunge (1877)

Genus of plants

Piptoptera is a monotypic genus of flowering plants belonging to the family Amaranthaceae. The only species is Piptoptera turkestana.

Its native range is Iran to Central Asia and Afghanistan.
