= Ofaiston =

Scientific classification
- Kingdom: Plantae
- Clade: Tracheophytes
- Clade: Angiosperms
- Clade: Eudicots
- Order: Caryophyllales
- Family: Amaranthaceae
- Genus: Ofaiston; Raf. (1837)
- Species: O. monandrum

Binomial name
- Ofaiston monandrum (Pall.) Moq. (1849)

Synonyms
- Anabasis juncea M.Bieb. ex Moq. (1849); Anabasis monandra Schrad. (1809); Halocnemum monandrum (Pall.) Georgi (1800); Halogeton monandrus (Pall.) C.A.Mey. (1829); Ofaiston pauciflorum Moq. (1849), orth. var.; Ofaiston paucifolium Raf. (1837); Salsola dichotoma Pall. (1776) (basionym); Salsola monandra Pall. (1776)

Genus of flowering plants

Ofaiston is a monotypic genus of flowering plants belonging to the family Amaranthaceae. The only species is Ofaiston monandrum.

Its native range is Eastern Europe to Western Siberia and Central Asia.
