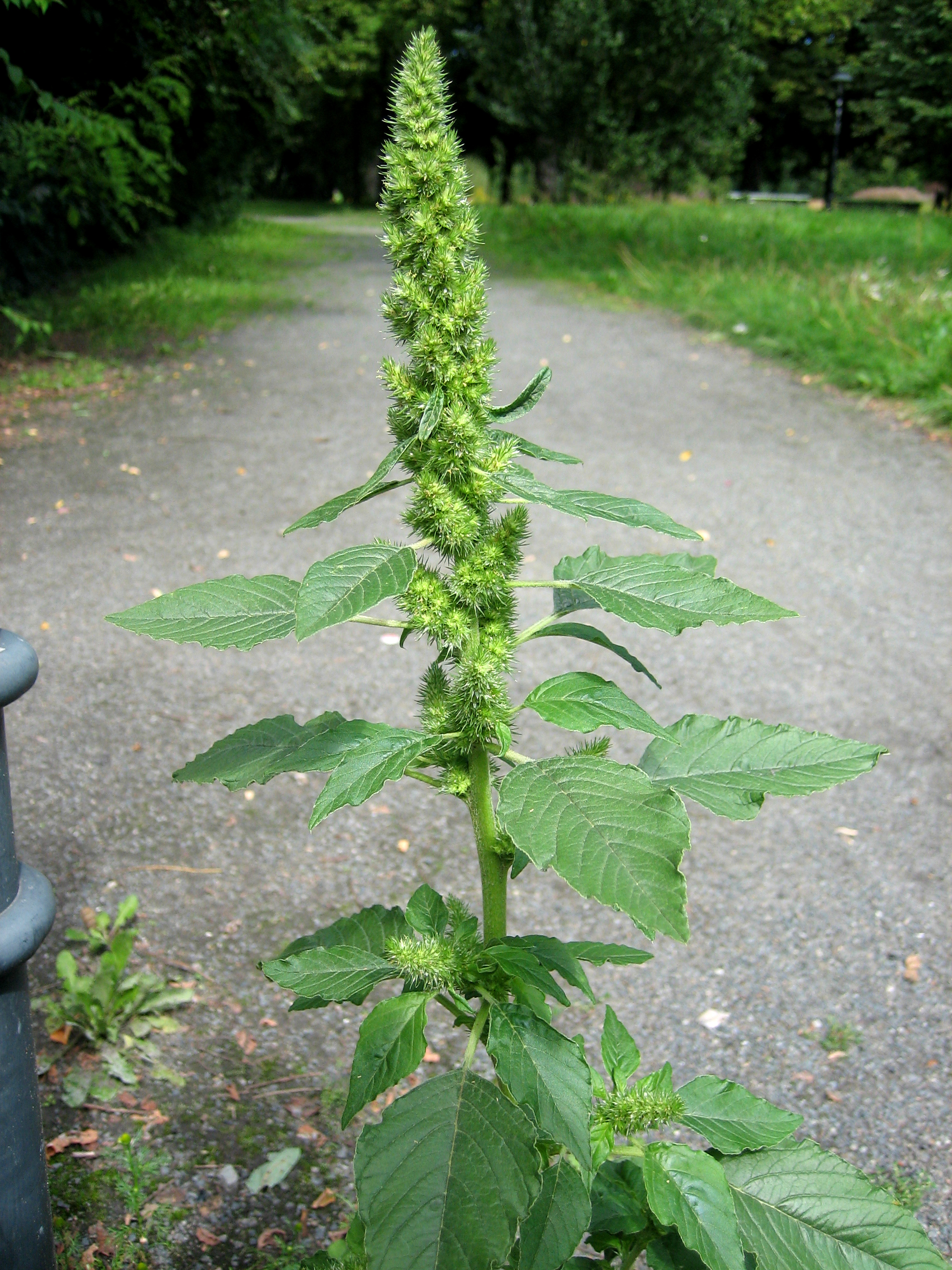
- Amaranthus retroflexus

Scientific classification
- Kingdom: Plantae
- Clade: Embryophytes
- Clade: Tracheophytes
- Clade: Angiosperms
- Clade: Eudicots
- Order: Caryophyllales
- Family: Amaranthaceae; Juss.

Type genus
- Amaranthus L.

Subfamilies
- Amaranthoideae; Betoideae; Camphorosmoideae; Chenopodioideae; Corispermoideae; Gomphrenoideae; Polycnemoideae; Salicornioideae; Salsoloideae; Suaedoideae

Synonyms
- Chenopodiaceae Vent.

= Amaranthaceae =

Family of flowering plants

Amaranthaceae (/ˌæmərænˈθeɪsi.iː, -ˌaɪ/ AM-ər-an-THAY-see-ee, -eye) is a family of flowering plants commonly known as the amaranth family, in reference to its type genus Amaranthus. It includes the former goosefoot family Chenopodiaceae and contains about 165 genera and 2,040 species, making it the most species-rich lineage within its parent order, Caryophyllales.

== Description ==
Most species in the Amaranthaceae are annual or perennial herbs or subshrubs; others are shrubs; very few species are vines or trees. Some species are succulent. Many species have stems with thickened nodes. The wood of the perennial stem has a typical "anomalous" secondary growth; only in subfamily Polycnemoideae is secondary growth normal.

The leaves are simple and mostly alternate, sometimes opposite. They never possess stipules. They are flat or terete, and their shape is extremely variable, with entire or toothed margins. In some species, the leaves are reduced to minute scales. In most cases, neither basal nor terminal aggregations of leaves occur.

The flowers are solitary or aggregated in cymes, spikes, or panicles and typically perfect (bisexual) and actinomorphic. Some species have unisexual flowers. Bracts and bracteoles are either herbaceous or scarious. Flowers are regular with an herbaceous or scarious perianth of (one to) mostly five (rarely to eight) tepals, often joined. One to five stamens are opposite to tepals or alternating, inserting from a hypogynous disc, which may have appendages (pseudostaminodes) in some species. The anthers have two or four pollen sacs (locules). In tribe Caroxyloneae, anthers have vesicular appendages. The pollen grains are spherical with many pores (pantoporate), with pore numbers from a few to 250 (in Froelichia). One to three (rarely six) carpels are fused to a superior ovary with one (rarely two) basal ovule. Idioblasts are found in the tissues.

The diaspores are seeds or fruits (utricles), more often the perianth persists and is modified in fruit for means of dispersal. Sometimes even bracts and bracteoles may belong to the diaspore. More rarely the fruit is a circumscissile capsule or a berry. The horizontal or vertical seed often has a thickened or woody seed coat. The green or white embryo is either spirally (and without perisperm) or annular (rarely straight).

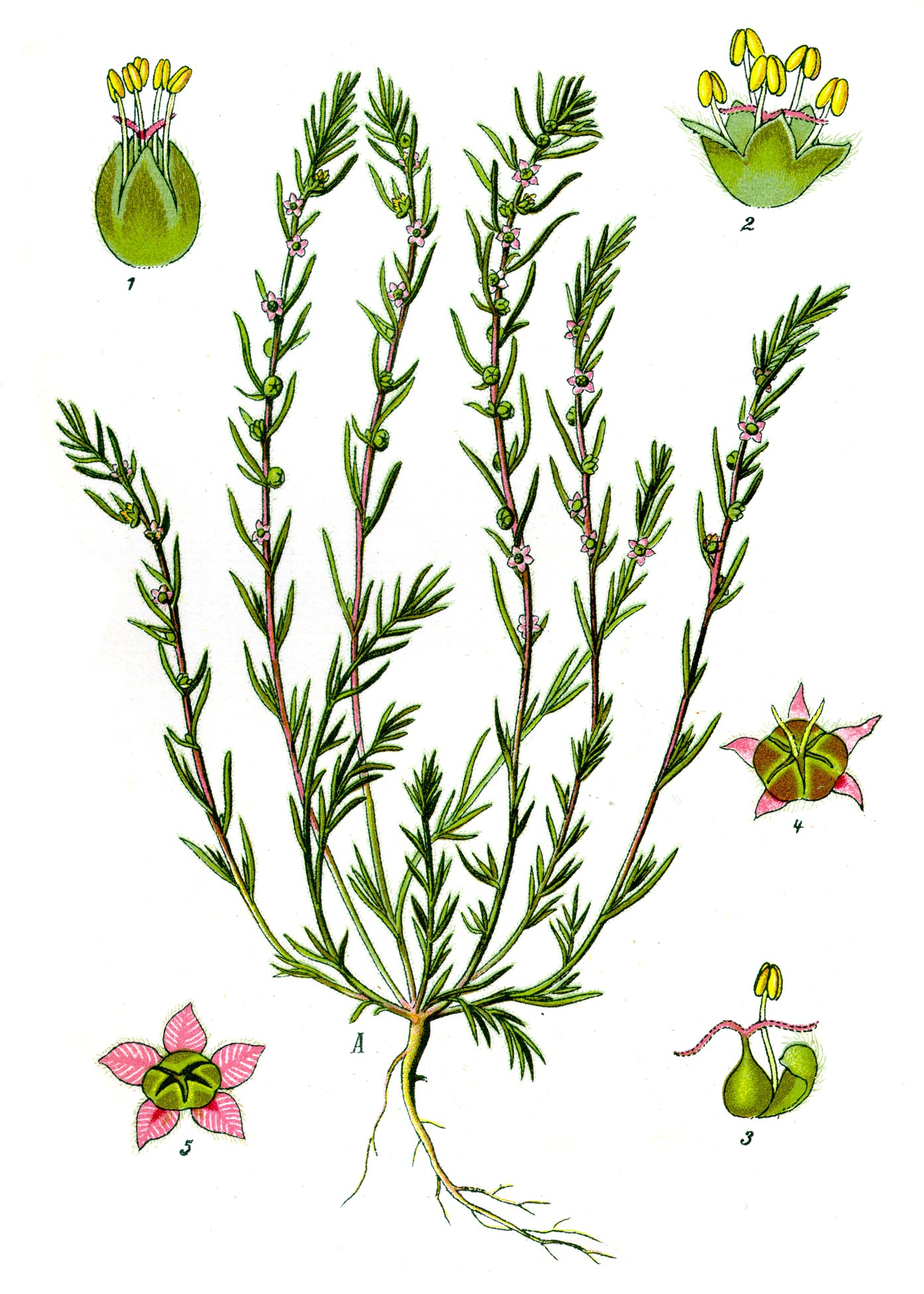
Bassia laniflora illustration, Camphorosmoideae

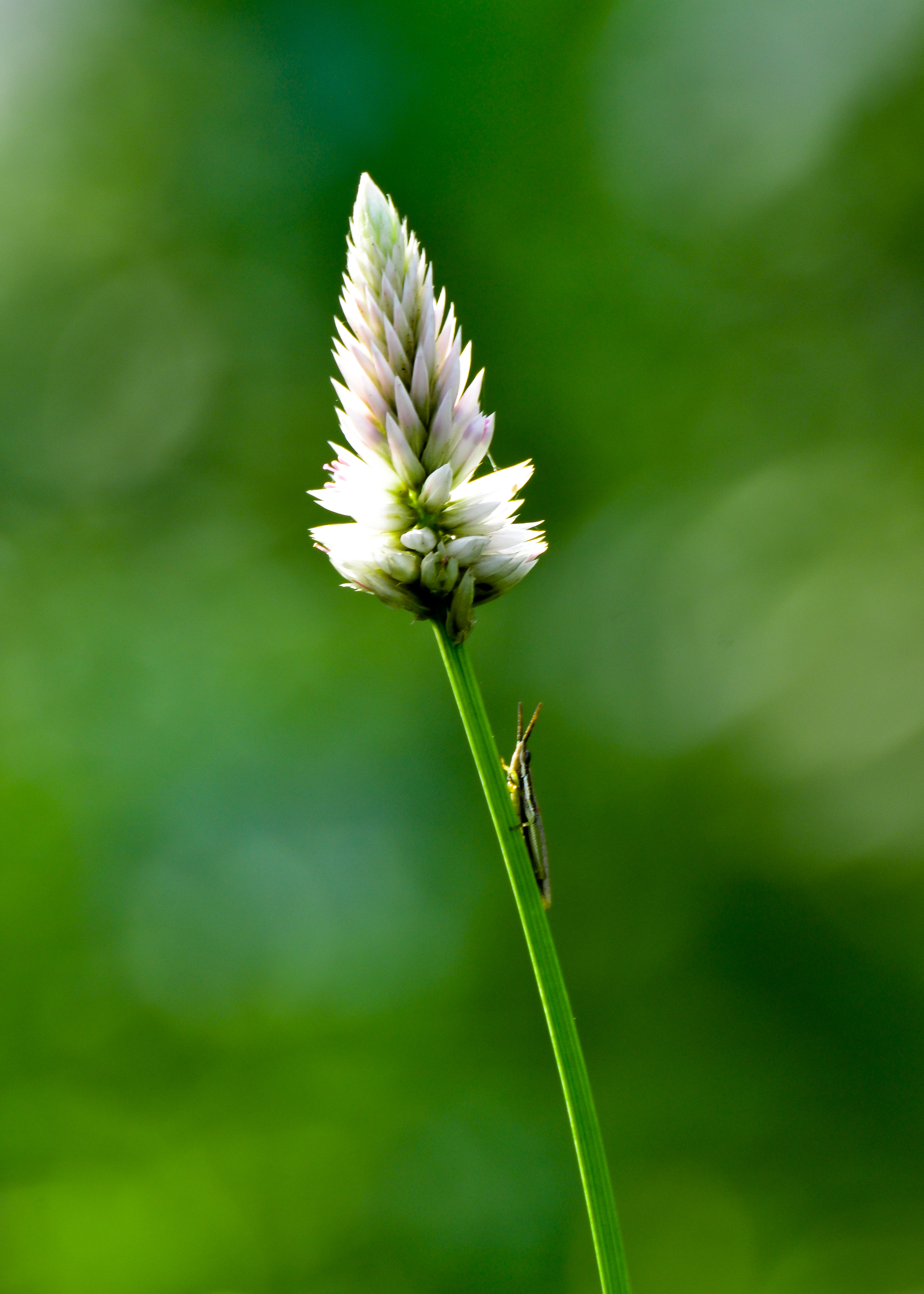
Celosia argentea flower, India

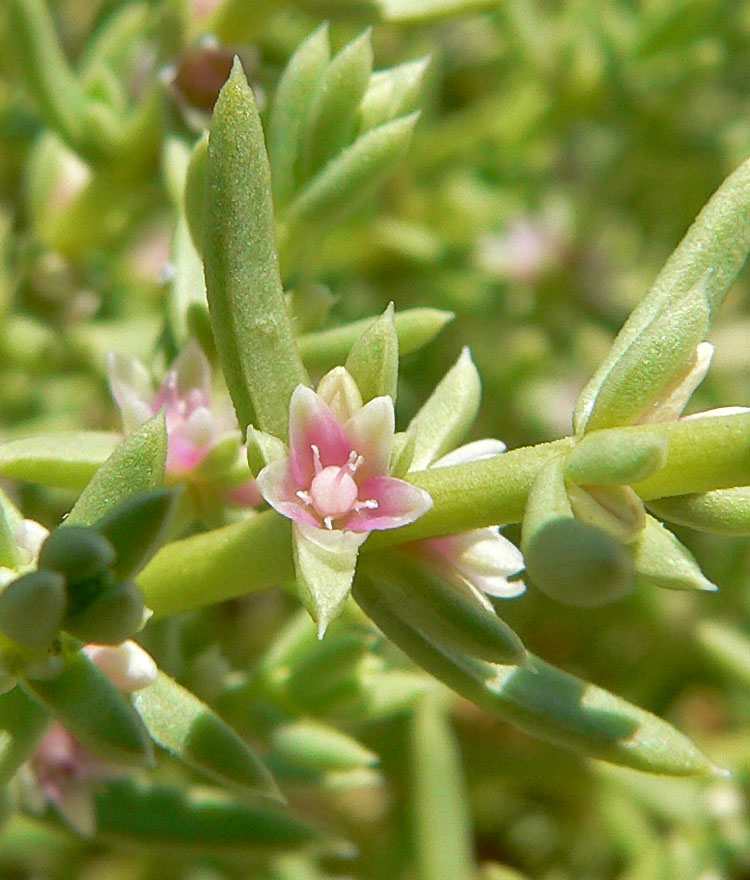
Nitrophila occidentalis flower, Polycnemoideae

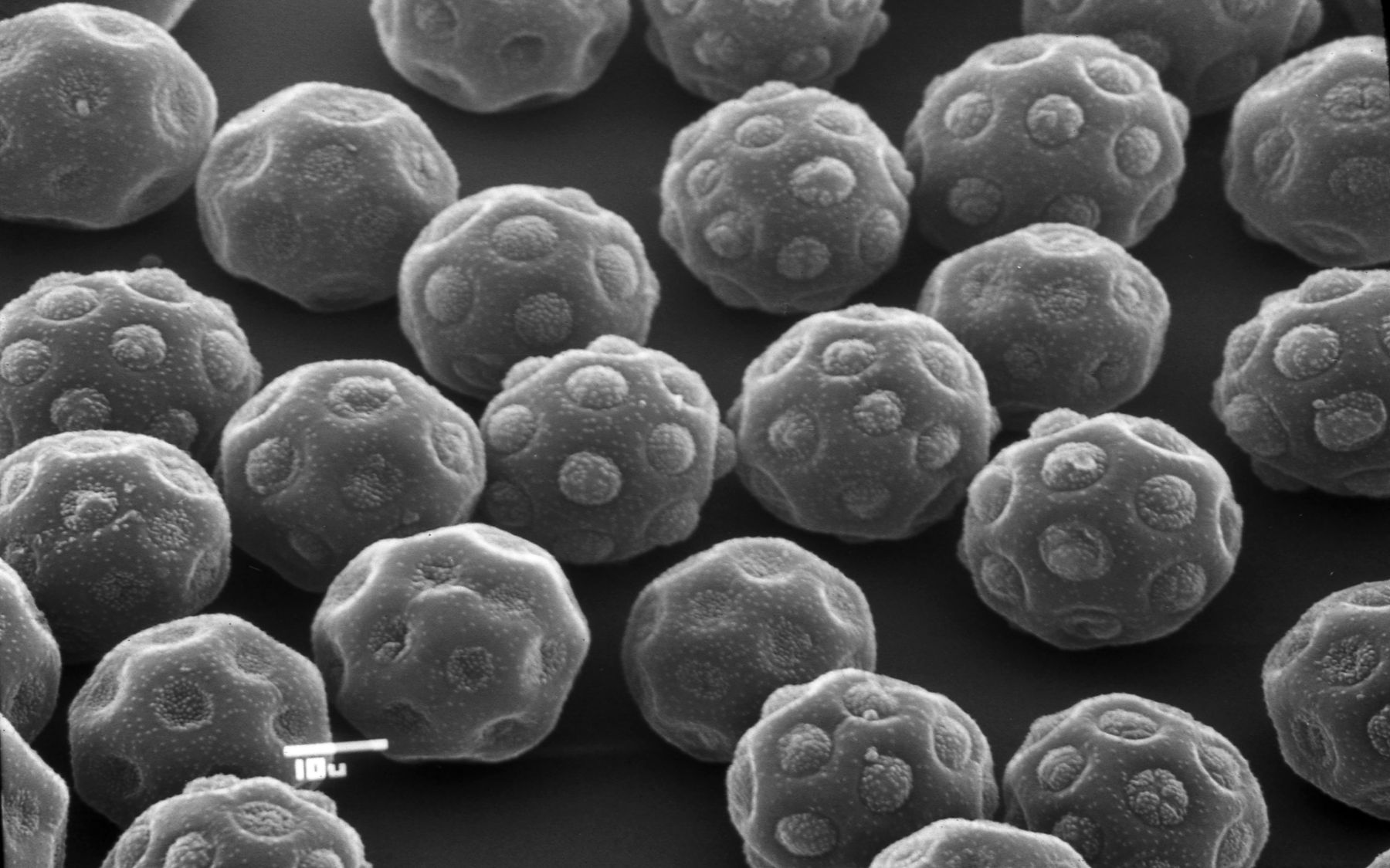
Halothamnus glaucus pollen grains

=== Chromosome number ===
The basic chromosome number is (rarely 6) mostly 8–9 (rarely 17).

=== Phytochemistry ===
Widespread in the Amaranthaceae is the occurrence of betalain pigments. The former Chenopodiaceae often contain isoflavonoids.

In phytochemical research, several methylenedioxyflavonols, saponins, triterpenoids, ecdysteroids, and specific root-located carbohydrates have been found in these plants.

=== Photosynthesis pathway ===
Although most of the family use the more common C_{3} photosynthesis pathway, around 800 species are C_{4} plants; this makes the Amaranthaceae the largest group with this photosynthesis pathway among the eudicots (which collectively includes about 1,600 C_{4} species). Within the family, several types of C_{4} photosynthesis occur, and about 17 different types of leaf anatomy are realized. Therefore, this photosynthesis pathway seems to have developed about 15 times independently during the evolution of the family. About two-thirds of the C_{4} species belong to the former Chenopodiaceae. The first occurrence of C_{4} photosynthesis dates from the early Miocene, about 24 million years ago, but in some groups, this pathway evolved much later, about 6 (or less) million years ago.

The multiple origin of C_{4} photosynthesis in the Amaranthaceae is regarded as an evolutionary response to inexorably decreasing atmospheric CO_{2} levels, coupled with a more recent permanent shortage in water supply as well as high temperatures. Species that use water more efficiently had a selective advantage and were able to spread out into arid habitats.

== Taxonomy ==
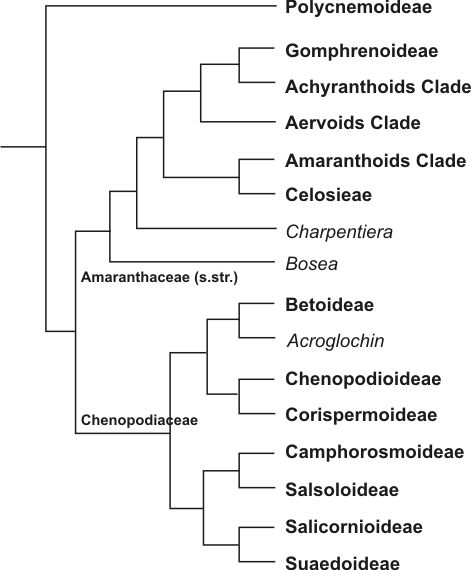
Cladogram of Amaranthaceae s.l., modified and simplified, based on phylogenetic research of Müller & Borsch 2005, Kadereit et al. 2006, Sanchez del-Pino et al. 2009

In the APG IV system of 2016, as in the previous Angiosperm Phylogeny Group classifications, the family is placed in the order Caryophyllales and includes the plants formerly treated as the family Chenopodiaceae. The monophyly of this broadly defined Amaranthaceae has been strongly supported by both morphological and phylogenetic analyses.

The family Amaranthaceae was first published in 1789 by Antoine Laurent de Jussieu in Genera Plantarum, p. 87–88. The first publication of family Chenopodiaceae was in 1799 by Étienne Pierre Ventenat in Tableau du Regne Vegetal, 2, p. 253. The older name has priority and is now the valid scientific name of the extended Amaranthaceae (s.l. = sensu lato).

Some publications still continued to use the family name Chenopodiaceae. Phylogenetic research revealed the important impact of the subfamily Polycnemoideae on the classification (see cladogram): if Polycnemoideae are considered a part of Chenopodiaceae, then Amaranthaceae sensu stricto have to be included, too, and the name of the extended family is Amaranthaceae. If Polycnemoideae is separated as its own family, Chenopodiaceae and Amaranthaceae sensu stricto would form two distinct monophyletic groups and could be treated as two separate families.

Amaranthaceae Juss. sensu lato includes the former families Achyranthaceae Raf., Atriplicaceae Durande, Betaceae Burnett, Blitaceae T.Post & Kuntze, Celosiaceae Martynov, Chenopodiaceae Vent. nom. cons., Corispermaceae Link, Deeringiaceae J.Agardh, Dysphaniaceae (Pax) Pax nom. cons., Gomphrenaceae Raf., Polycnemaceae Menge, Salicorniaceae Martynov, Salsolaceae Menge, and Spinaciaceae Menge.

The systematics of Amaranthaceae are the subject of intensive recent research. Molecular genetic studies revealed the traditional classification, based on morphological and anatomical characters, often did not reflect the phylogenetic relationships.

The former Amaranthaceae (in their narrow circumscription) are classified into two subfamilies, Amaranthoideae and Gomphrenoideae, and contain about 65 genera and 900 species in tropical Africa and North America. The Amaranthoideae and some genera of Gomphrenoideae were found to be polyphyletic, so taxonomic changes are needed.

Current studies classified the species of former Chenopodiaceae to eight distinct subfamilies (the research is not yet completed): Polycnemoideae, which are sister to the remaining subfamilies; Betoideae; Camphorosmoideae; Chenopodioideae; Corispermoideae; Salicornioideae; Salsoloideae; and Suaedoideae. In this preliminary classification, the Amaranthaceae sensu lato are divided into 10 subfamilies with approximately 180 genera and 2,500 species.

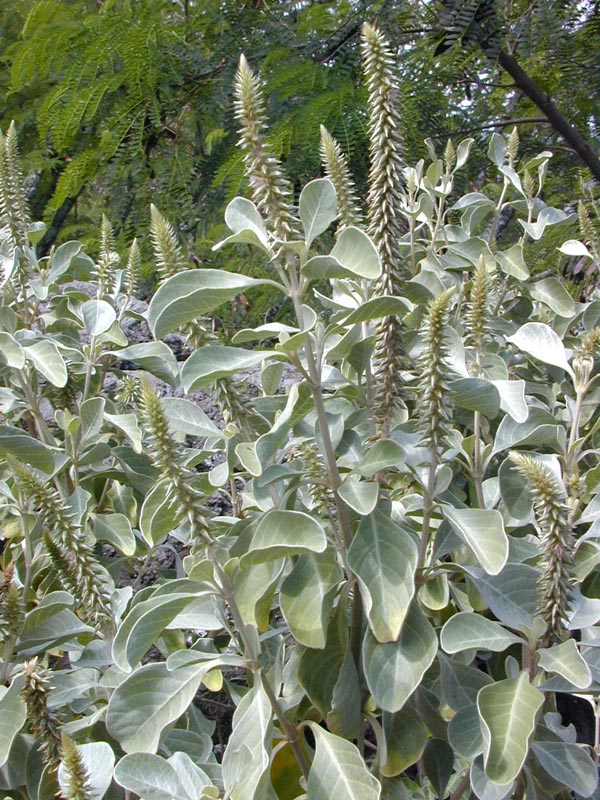
Achyranthes splendens, Amaranthoideae

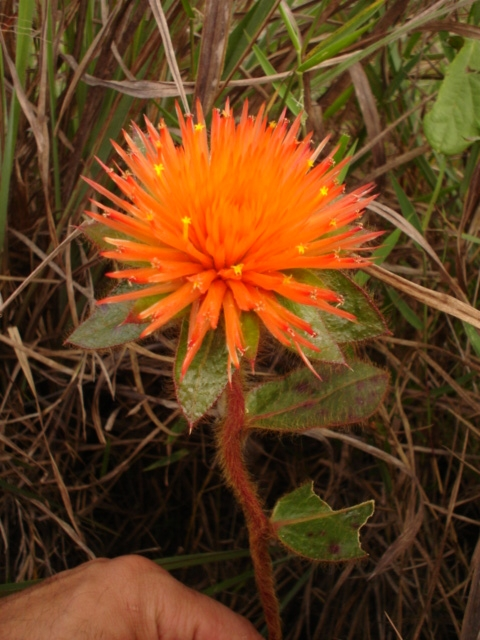
Gomphrena arborescens, Gomphrenoideae

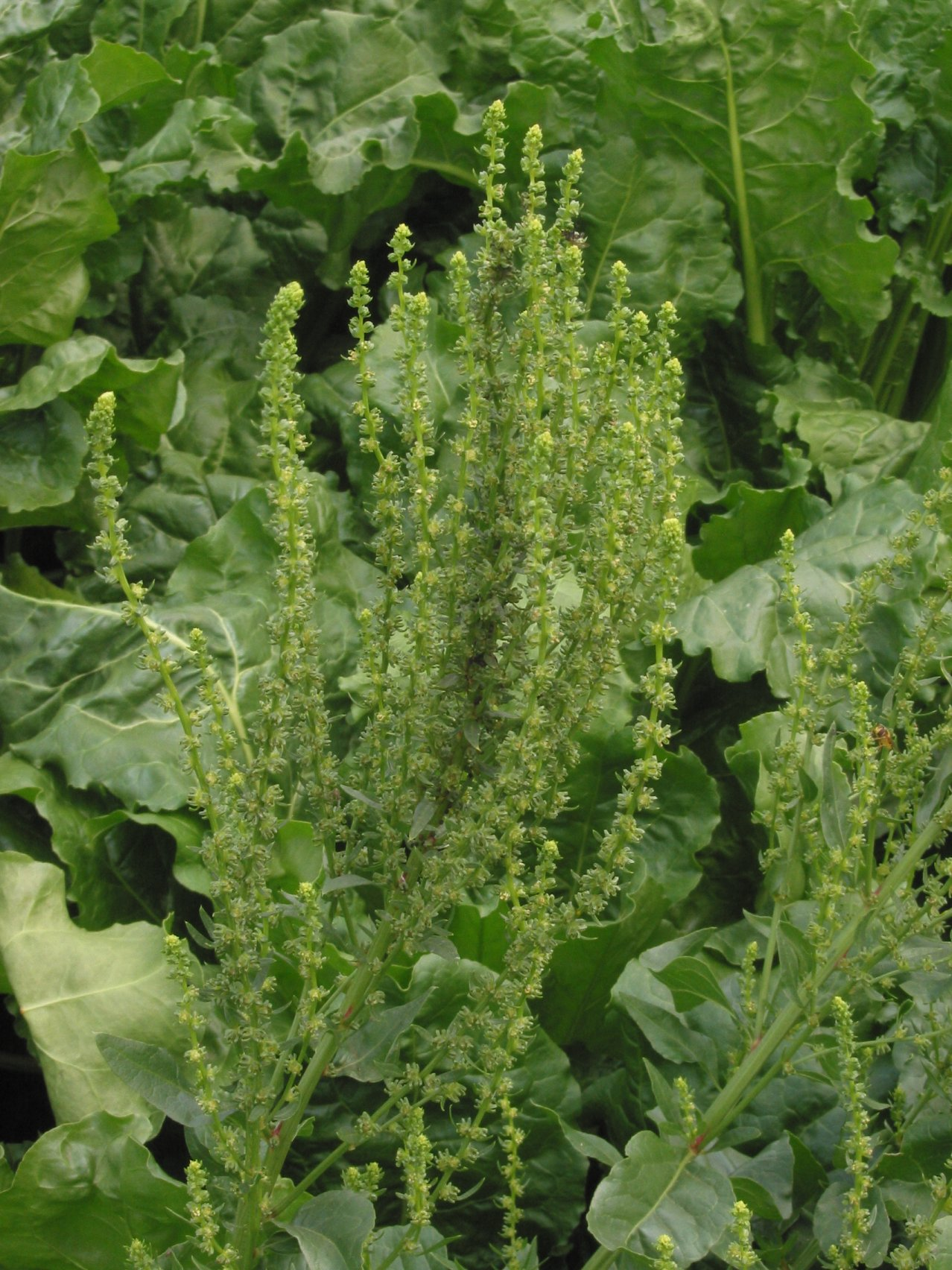
Sugar beet, Beta vulgaris subsp. vulgaris 'altissima', Betoideae

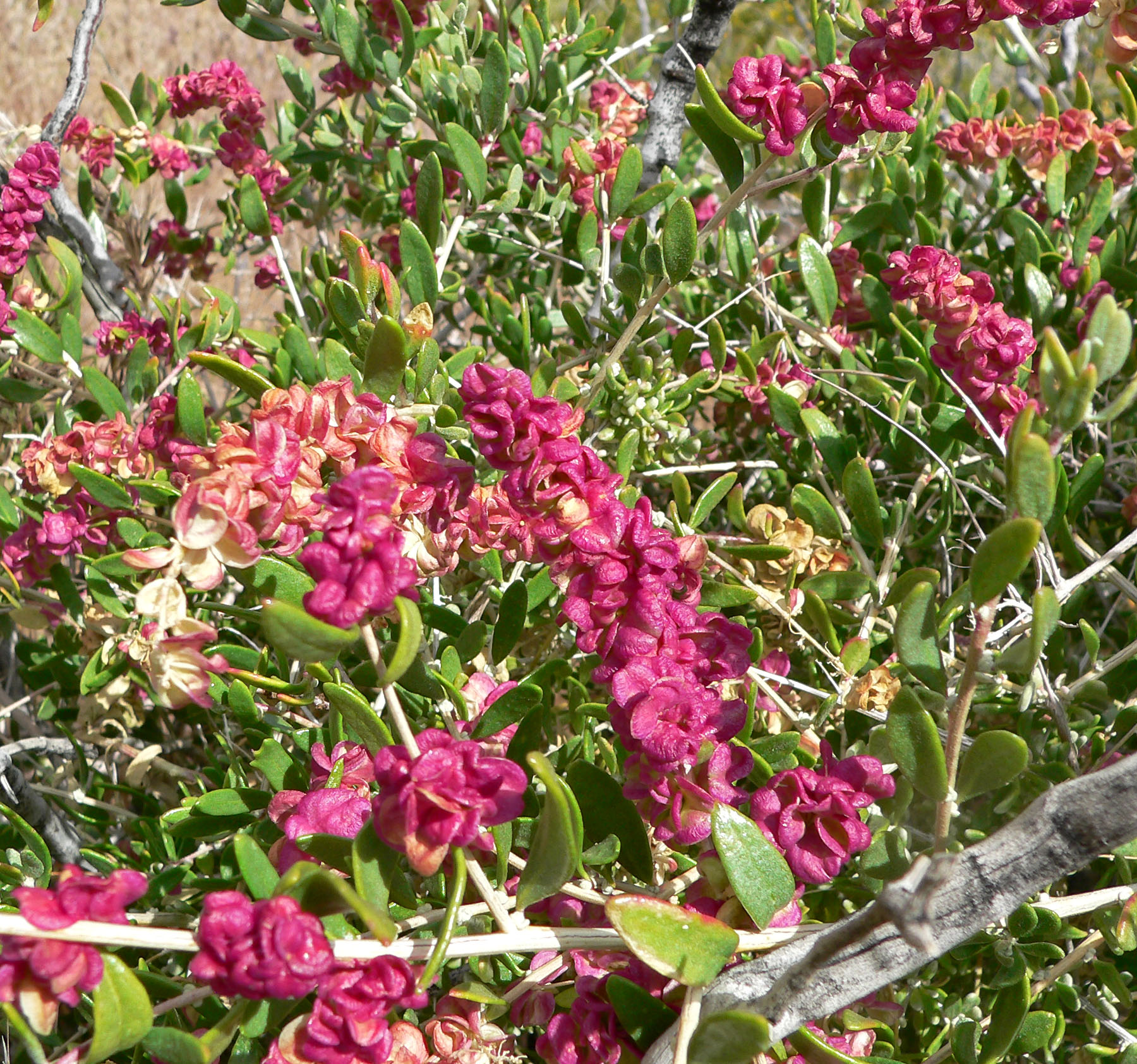
Grayia spinosa, Chenopodioideae

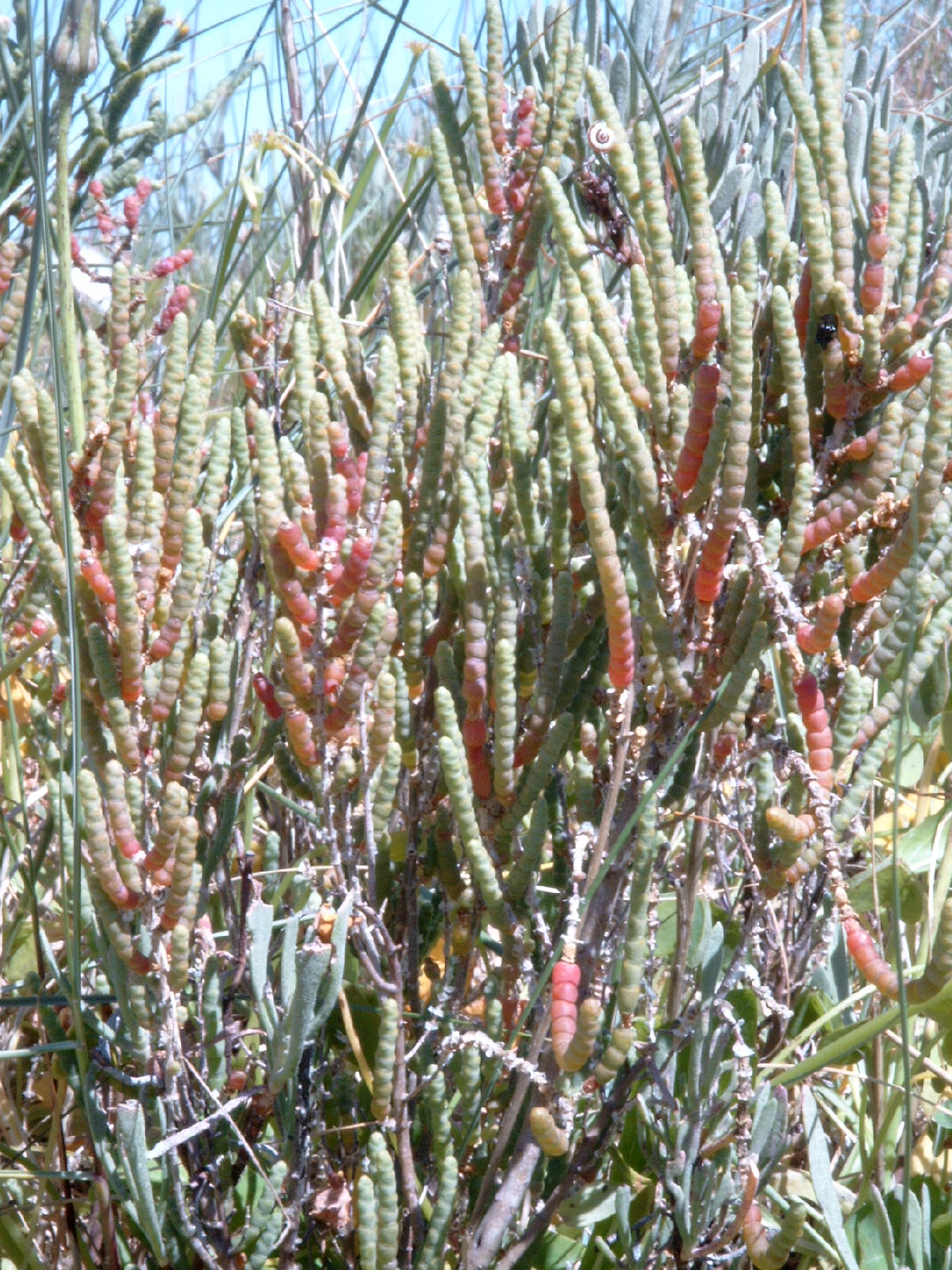
Salicornia perennis, Salicornioideae

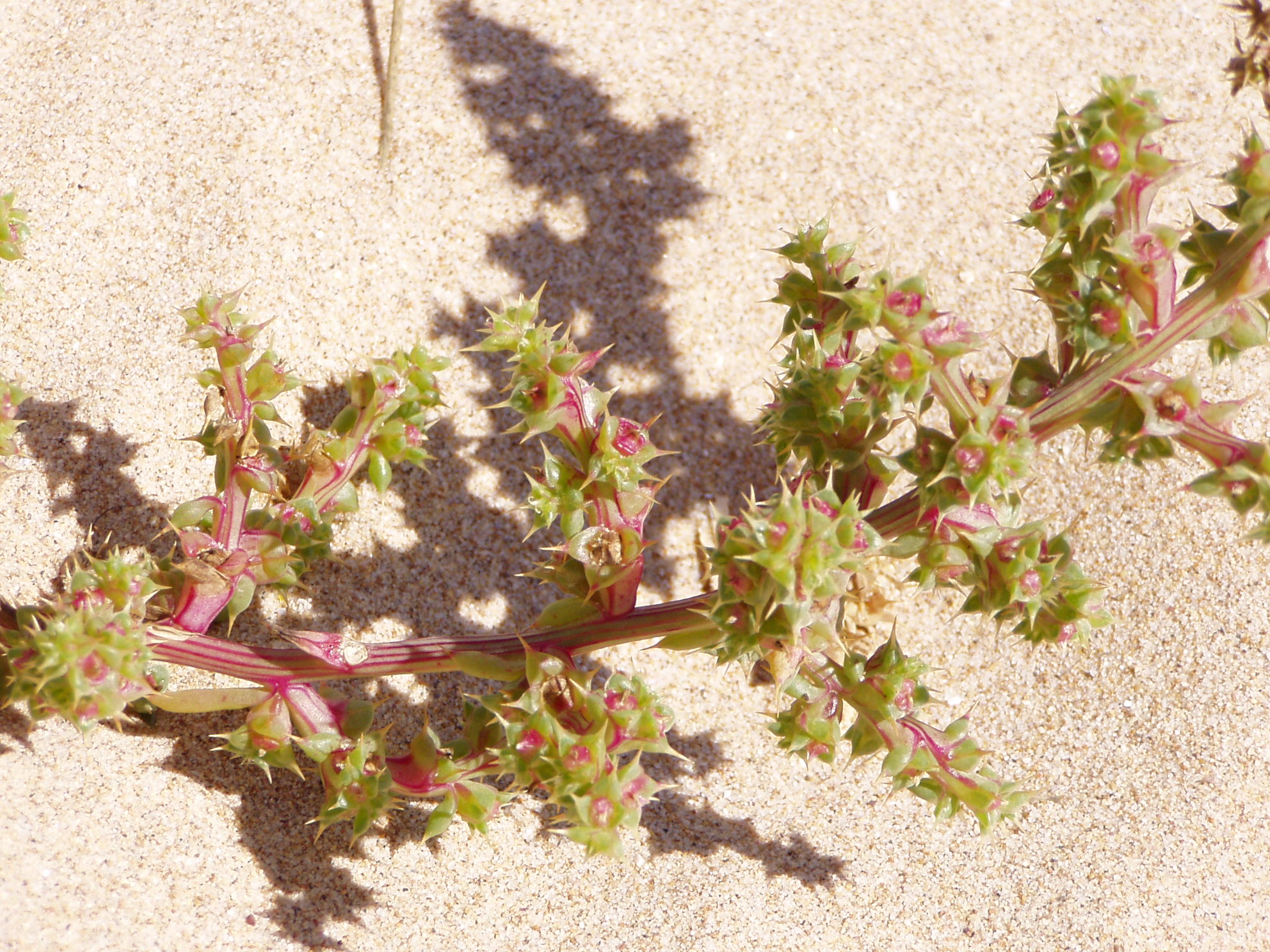
Salsola kali, Salsoloideae

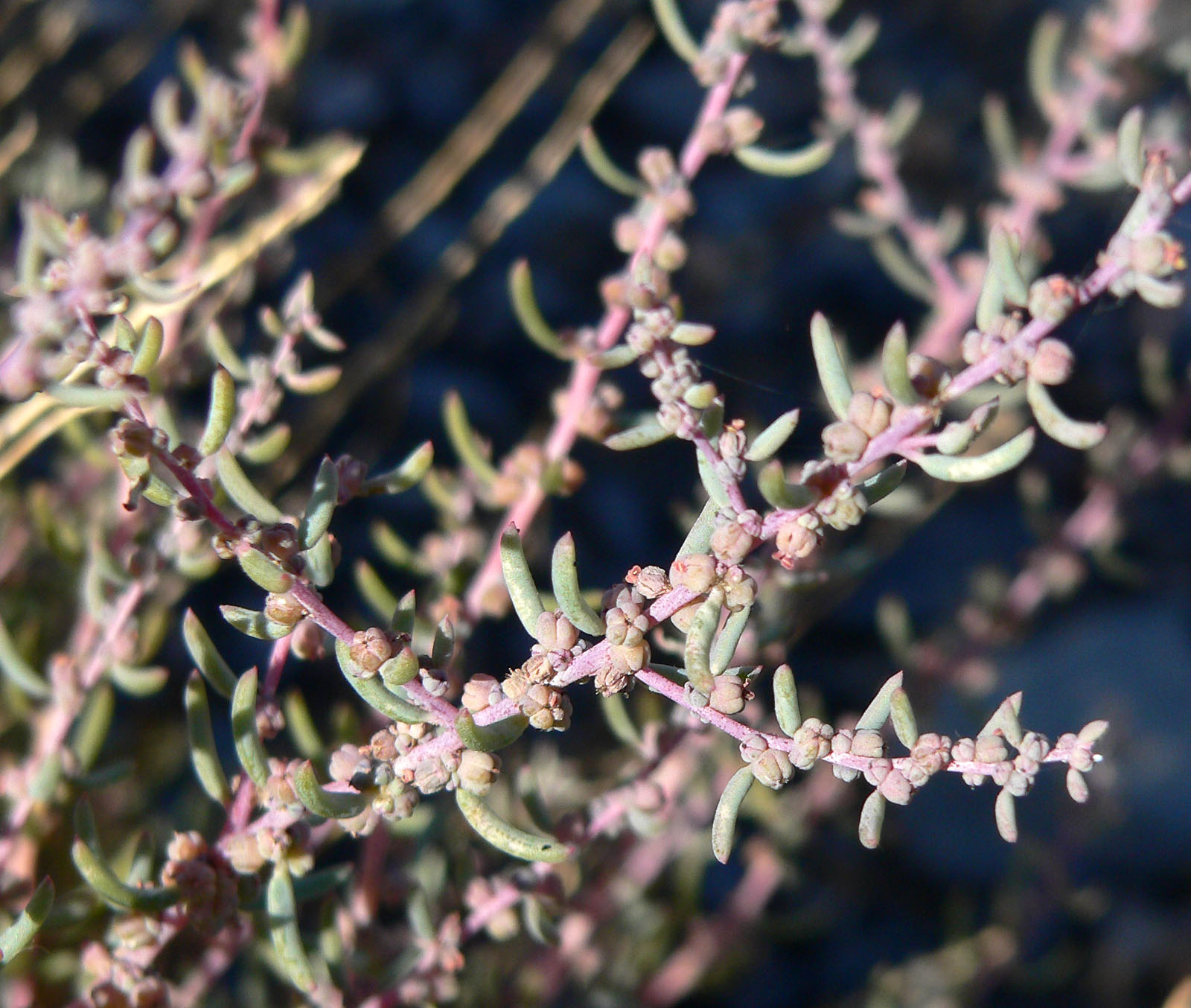
Suaeda nigra, Suaedoideae

=== Genera ===
183 genera are accepted. A short synoptic list of genera is given here. For further and more detailed information, see the subfamily pages.

Subfamily	Genera
Amaranthoideae	Achyranthes, Aerva, Allmania, Allmaniopsis, Amaranthus, Arthraerua, Bosea, Calicorema, Celosia, Centema, Centemopsis, Centrostachys, Chamissoa, Charpentiera, Chionothrix, Cyathula, Dasysphaera, Deeringia, Digera, Eriostylos, Evelynastra, Henonia, Herbstia, Hermbstaedtia, Indobanalia, Kyphocarpa, Lagrezia, Lecosia, Leucosphaera, Lopriorea, Marcelliopsis, Mechowia, Neocentema, Nothosaerva, Nototrichium, Nyssanthes, Omegandra, Ouret, Pandiaka, Paraerva, Pleuropetalum, Pleuropterantha, Polyrhabda, Psilotrichopsis, Psilotrichum, Ptilotus, Pupalia, Rosifax, Saltia, Sebsebea, Sericocoma, Sericorema, Sericostachys, Siamosia, Stilbanthus, Trichuriella, Volkensinia, Wadithamnus
Gomphrenoideae	Alternanthera, Froelichia, Froelichiella, Gomphrena, Guilleminea, Hebanthe, Hebanthodes, Iresine, Pedersenia, Pfaffia, Pseudoplantago, Quaternella, Tidestromia, Xerosiphon
Betoideae	Acroglochin, Aphanisma, Beta, Hablitzia, Oreobliton, Patellifolia
Camphorosmoideae	Bassia, Camphorosma, Chenolea, Didymanthus, Dissocarpus, Enchylaena, Eokochia, Eremophea, Eriochiton, Grubovia, Maireana, Malacocera, Neobassia, Neokochia, Osteocarpum, Roycea, Sclerolaena, Spirobassia, Threlkeldia
Chenopodioideae	Archiatriplex, Atriplex, Axyris, Baolia, Blitum, Ceratocarpus, Chenopodiastrum, Chenopodium, Dysphania, Exomis, Extriplex, Grayia, Halimione, Holmbergia, Krascheninnikovia, Lipandra, × Lipastrum, Manochlamys, Microgynoecium, Micromonolepis, Neomonolepis, Oxybasis, Proatriplex, Spinacia, Stutzia, Suckleya, Teloxys
Corispermoideae	Agriophyllum, Anthochlamys, Corispermum
Polycnemoideae	Hemichroa, Nitrophila, Polycnemum, Surreya
Salicornioideae	Allenrolfea, Arthrocaulon (split from Arthrocnemum), Arthroceras (split from Arthrocnemum), Halocnemum, Halopeplis, Halostachys, Heterostachys, Kalidium, Mangleticornia, Microcnemum, Salicornia, Tecticornia
Salsoloideae	Afrosalsola, Agathophora, Akhania, Anabasis, Arthrophytum, Caroxylon, Climacoptera, Cornulaca, Cyathobasis, Fadenia, Girgensohnia, Halanthium, Halarchon, Halimocnemis, Halocharis, Halogeton, Halothamnus, Haloxylon, Hammada, Horaninovia, Iljinia, Kaviria, Lagenantha, Nanophyton, Noaea, Nucularia, Ofaiston, Oreosalsola, Petrosimonia, Piptoptera, Pyankovia, Rhaphidophyton, Salsola, Sevada, Soda, Sympegma, Traganopsis, Traganum, Turania, Xylosalsola
Suaedoideae	Bienertia, Suaeda

== Distribution and habitat ==
Amaranthaceae is a widespread and cosmopolitan family from the tropics to cool temperate regions. The Amaranthaceae (sensu stricto) are predominantly tropical, whereas the former Chenopodiaceae have their centers of diversity in dry temperate and warm temperate areas. Many of the species are halophytes, tolerating salty soils, or grow in dry steppes or semi-deserts. Many tumbleweeds belong to this family.

== Uses ==
Some species, such as spinach (Spinacia oleracea) or forms of beet (Beta vulgaris) (beetroot, chard), are used as vegetables. Forms of Beta vulgaris include fodder beet (Mangelwurzel) and sugar beet. The seeds of Amaranthus, lamb's quarters (Chenopodium berlandieri), quinoa (Chenopodium quinoa) and kañiwa (Chenopodium pallidicaule) are edible and are used as pseudocereals.

Dysphania ambrosioides (epazote) and Dysphania anthelmintica are used as medicinal herbs. Several amaranth species are also used indirectly as a source of soda ash, such as members of the genus Salicornia (see glasswort).

A number of species are popular garden ornamental plants, especially species from the genera Alternanthera, Amaranthus, Celosia, and Iresine. Other species are considered weeds, e.g., redroot pigweed (Amaranthus retroflexus) and alligatorweed (Alternanthera philoxeroides), and several are problematic invasive species, particularly in North America, including Salsola tragus and Bassia scoparia. Many species are known to cause pollen allergies.
