= Sebsebea =

Scientific classification
- Kingdom: Plantae
- Clade: Tracheophytes
- Clade: Angiosperms
- Clade: Eudicots
- Order: Caryophyllales
- Family: Amaranthaceae
- Genus: Sebsebea; Di Vincenzo, Berends., Wondafr. & Borsch
- Species: S. orthacantha

Binomial name
- Sebsebea orthacantha (Hochst. ex Asch.) Di Vincenzo, Berends., Wondafr. & Borsch

Synonyms
- Cyathula kilimandscharica Suess. & Beyerle; Cyathula orthacantha (Hochst. ex Asch.) Schinz in H.G.A.Engler & K.A.E.Prantl; Cyathula orthacanthoides Suess.; Kyphocarpa orthacantha (Hochst. ex Asch.) C.B.Clarke; Pupalia erecta Suess.; Pupalia orthacantha Hochst. ex Asch. (1867) (basionym); Sericocomopsis orthacantha (Hochst. ex Asch.) Peter

Genus of flowering plants

Sebsebea is a genus of flowering plants in the family Amaranthaceae. It includes a single species, Sebsebea orthacantha, an annual native to eastern and Southern Africa, ranging from Eritrea to Namibia and the Northern Provinces of South Africa.
