= Pedersenia =

Scientific classification
- Kingdom: Plantae
- Clade: Tracheophytes
- Clade: Angiosperms
- Clade: Eudicots
- Order: Caryophyllales
- Family: Amaranthaceae
- Genus: Pedersenia; Holub

Synonyms
- Trommsdorffia Mart.

Genus of flowering plants

Pedersenia is a genus of flowering plants belonging to the family Amaranthaceae.

Its native range is mainland tropical America, from Honduras to Paraguay, and Puerto Rico and the Windward Islands.

The genus name of Pedersenia is in honour of Troels Myndel Pedersen (1916–2000), a Danish-born Argentinian botanist with a large herbarium and also specialist in Amaranthaceae. It was first described and published in Preslia Vol.70 on page 181 in 1998.

== Known species ==
According to Kew:

- Pedersenia argentata (Mart.) Holub
- Pedersenia cardenasii (Standl.) Holub
- Pedersenia completa (Uline & W.L.Bray) Borsch
- Pedersenia costaricensis (Standl.) Holub
- Pedersenia hassleriana (Chodat) Pedersen
- Pedersenia macrophylla (R.E.Fr.) Holub
- Pedersenia volubilis Borsch, T.Ortuño & M.Nee
- Pedersenia weberbaueri (Suess.) Holub
