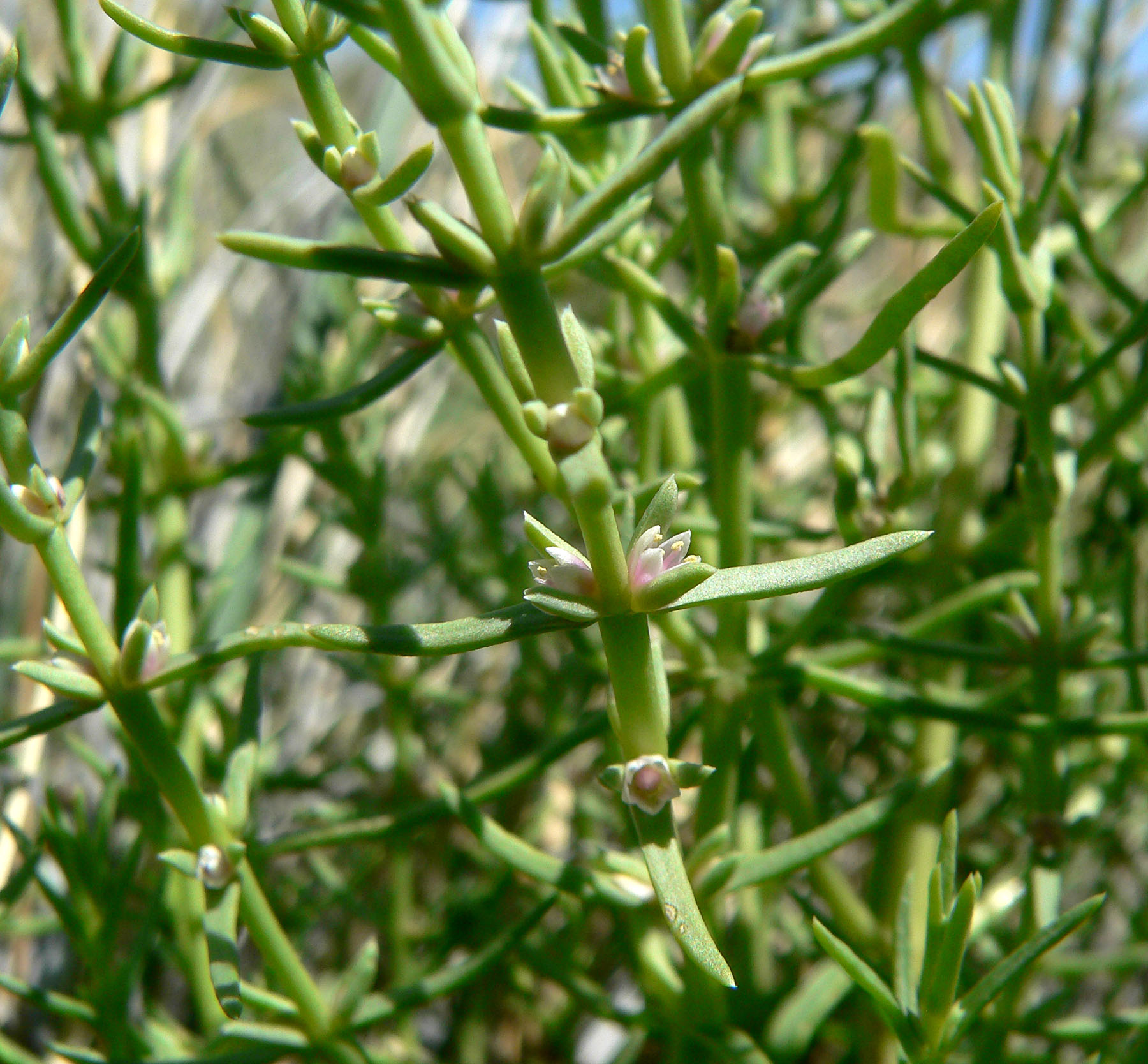
- Nitrophila occidentalis

Scientific classification
- Kingdom: Plantae
- Clade: Tracheophytes
- Clade: Angiosperms
- Clade: Eudicots
- Order: Caryophyllales
- Family: Amaranthaceae
- Subfamily: Polycnemoideae; Ulbr.

Genera
- 4 genera, see text

= Polycnemoideae =

Subfamily of flowering plants

The Polycnemoideae are a small subfamily of plants in the family Amaranthaceae sensu lato. The few relictual species are distributed in Eurasia and North Africa, North America, and Australia.

== Description ==
The subfamily Polycnemoideae comprises small herbs; some species are weakly lignified and grow shrublike. The subfamily is distinguishable from all other members of Amaranthaceae by normal secondary growth. The alternate or opposite leaves are often linear or subulate. The stomata of the leaves are arranged in parallel to the midveins.

The bisexual flowers are sitting solitary in the axil of a bract and two bracteoles. The inconspicuous perianth is formed of chartaceous, scarious, white or pinkish tepals. One to five stamens are present with their filaments united in a short but distinct filament tube (like in subfamily Amaranthoideae). Anthers are with only one lobe and two pollen sacs (bilocular, like in subfamily Gomphrenoideae). In fruit, the tepals are never conspicuously modified.

== Photosynthesis pathway ==
The Polycnemoideae are all C_{3}-plants. This is considered a primary character.

== Distribution and evolution ==
The Polycnemoideae are distributed in the temperate regions of Eurasia (central and southern Europe, northwestern Africa, Central Asia), North America, and Australia.

Polycnemoideae began to diverge from Amaranthaceae sensu stricto in the Eocene. At the edge from Eocene to Oligocene, the subfamily split into a lineage in the Northern Hemisphere, which was the ancestor of Polycnemum, and a lineage predominantly occurring on the Southern Hemisphere with the ancestors of Nitrophila, Hemichroa, and Surreya. An Antarctic connection of these southern ancestors is assumed. The genus Nitrophila developed in South America and dispersed later to North America. The genera of the subfamily diversified during Miocene and Pliocene, with only a few rare species that seem to be relictual.

== Systematics ==
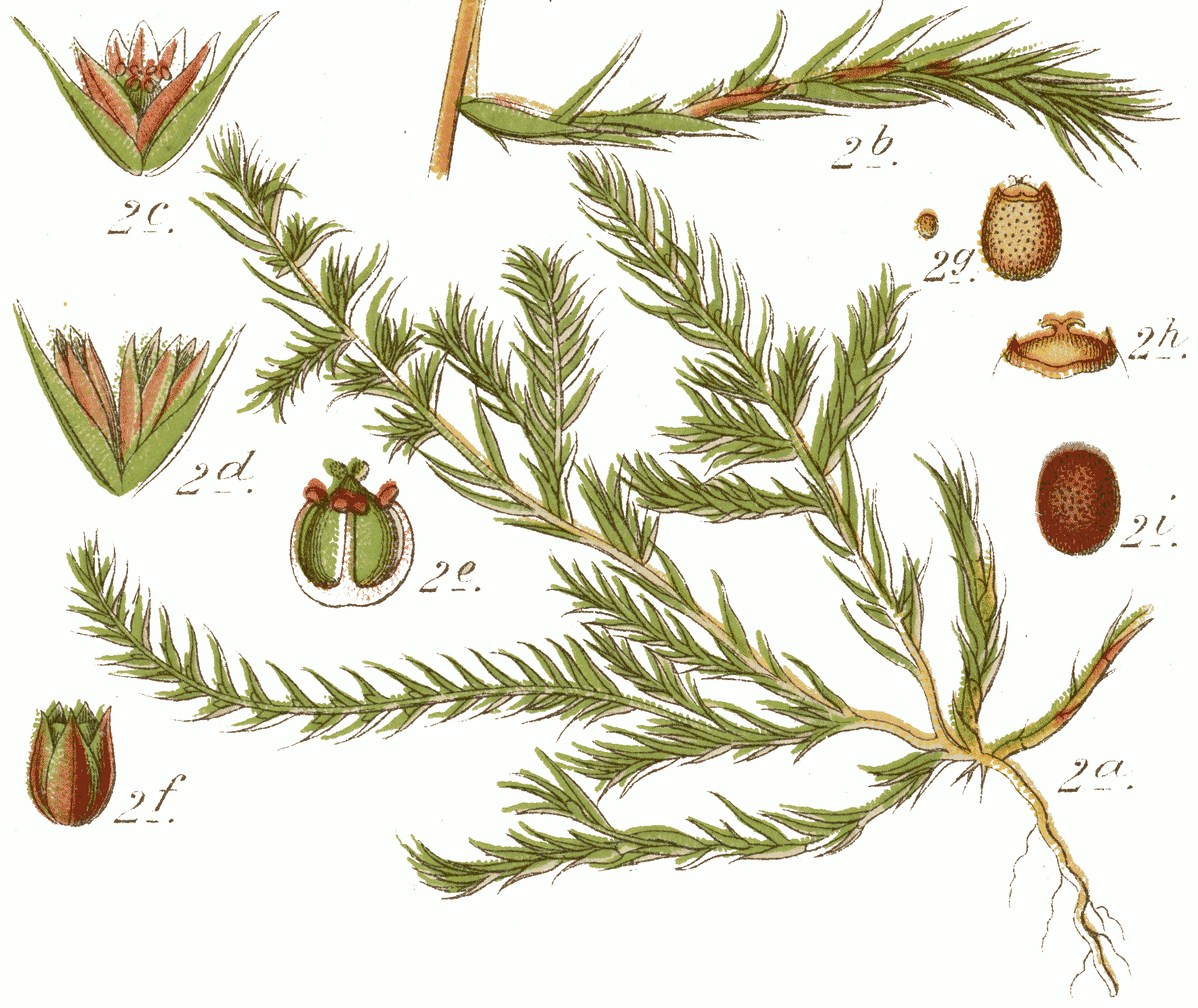
Polycnemum arvense, Illustration

The intrafamilial position of the Polycnemoideae has long been a matter of dispute. The taxon was recognized in 1827 as Tribus Polycnemeae within the family Chenopodiaceae by Dumortier (In Florula Belgica). Later, it was treated as belonging to the family Amaranthaceae in 1849 by Moquin-Tandon (in Prodromus systematis naturalis.... Vol 13). Oskar Eberhard Ulbrich raised it to subfamilial level in 1934, again within Chenopodiaceae (in Engler & Prantl: Die natürlichen Pflanzenfamilien. Vol 16c). Today, both families are included in Amaranthaceae sensu lato

Molecular phylogenetic studies have supported a variety of relationships between the Polycnemoideae and other members of the Amaranthaceae sensu lato, with relationships dependent at least in part on the use of nuclear versus plastid gene markers. Extensive phylogenetic hypothesis testing using both nuclear and plastic gene markers fails to resolve clear relationships between major clades within Amaranthaceae sensu lato, including the Polycnemoideae; this discordance likely results primarily from rapid, ancient lineage diversification in the group.

The Polycnemoideae comprise only one tribe, Polycnemeae, with four genera and 13 species:

- Hemichroa R.Br., with alternate, linear, succulent leaves, and stigmas papillous all around: only one species in Australia:
  - Hemichroa pentandra
- Nitrophila S.Watson - niterwort, with opposite leaves, and stigmas papillous only on the inside, 4 species in North, Middle and South America:
  - Nitrophila atacamensis (Phil.) Ulbr.
  - Nitrophila australis Chodat & Wilczek
  - Nitrophila mohavensis Munz & J.C. Roos - Amargosa niterwort
  - Nitrophila occidentalis (Moq.) S. Watson - western niterwort, boraxweed
- Polycnemum L., with alternate, subulate, non-succulent leaves, and stigmas papillous all around. 6 species in Eurasia (central and southern Europe, northwestern Africa, Central Asia):
  - Polycnemum arvense L. - field needleleaf, soft needleleaf
  - Polycnemum fontanesii Durieu & Moq.
  - Polycnemum heuffelii Láng
  - Polycnemum majus A. Braun ex Bogenh. - giant needleleaf
  - Polycnemum perenne Litv.
  - Polycnemum verrucosum Láng - warty needleleaf
- Surreya R. Masson & G. Kadereit, two species in Australia:
  - Surreya diandra (R. Br.) R. Masson & G. Kadereit (Syn. Hemichroa diandra R. Br.)
  - Surreya mesembryanthema (R. Br.) R. Masson & G. Kadereit (Syn. Hemichroa mesembryanthema R. Br.)
