= Hemichroa =

Hemichroa may refer to:

- Hemichroa (plant), a genus of plants in the family Amaranthaceae
- Hemichroa (sawfly), a genus of sawflies in the family Tenthredinidae
