= Showy goldenrod =

Showy goldenrod is a common name for several plants and may refer to:

- Solidago erecta, native to the eastern United States, formerly treated as a variety of Solidago speciosa
- Solidago speciosa, native to the eastern United States
- Solidago spectabilis, native to the Great Basin region of the western United States
