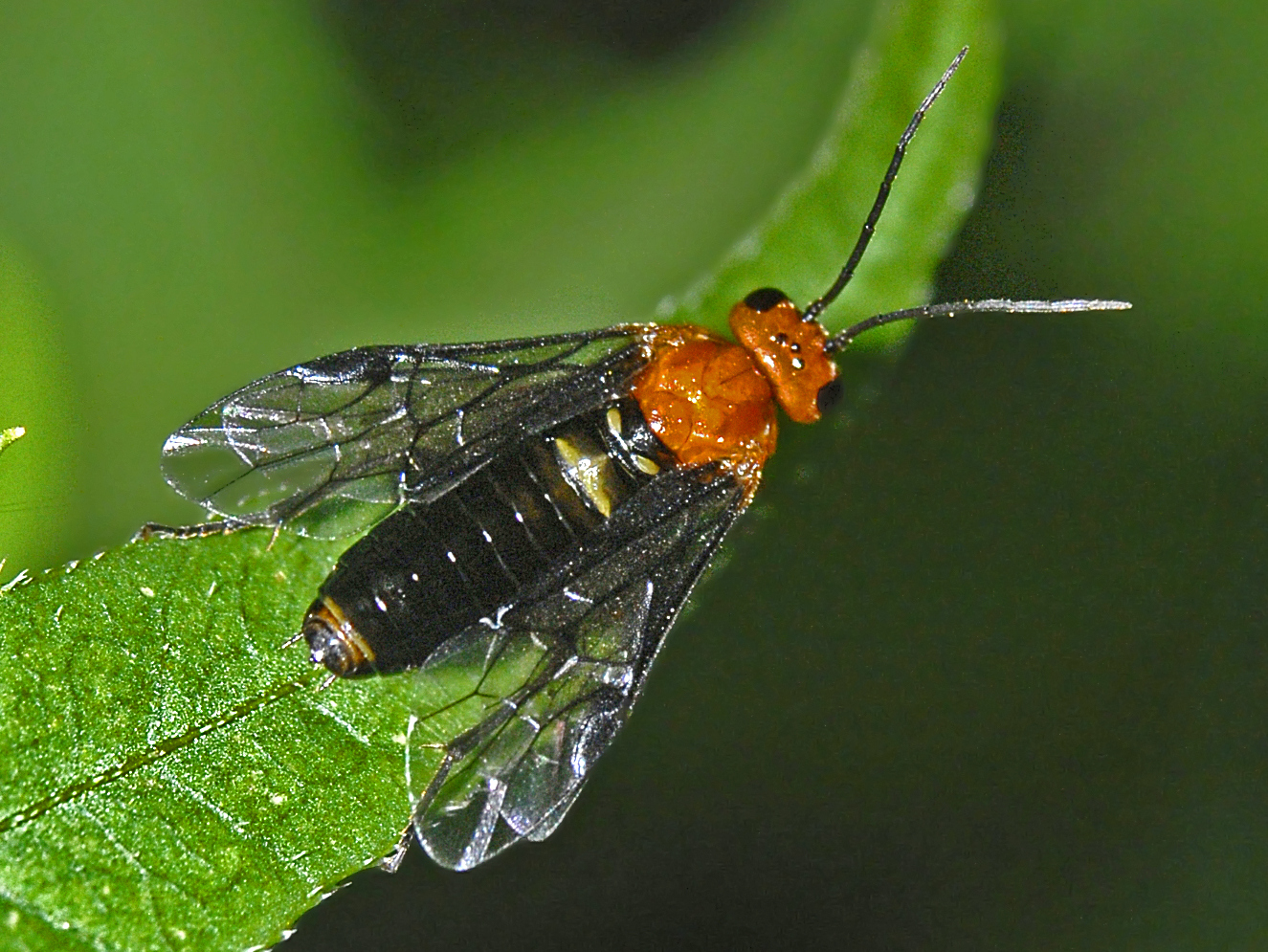

Scientific classification
- Domain: Eukaryota
- Kingdom: Animalia
- Phylum: Arthropoda
- Class: Insecta
- Order: Hymenoptera
- Suborder: Symphyta
- Family: Tenthredinidae
- Genus: Hemichroa
- Species: H. australis

Binomial name
- Hemichroa australis (Serville, 1823)

Synonyms
- Tenthredo alni Linnaeus, 1767; Hemichroa alni; Tenthredo australis Serville, 1823; Tenthredo luctuosa nomen oblitum Hill, 1773

= Hemichroa australis =

Species of sawfly

Hemichroa australis is a species of sawflies in the family Tenthredinidae.

== Description ==
Hemichroa australis can reach a length of about 7–8 millimetres (0.28–0.31 in). Head and thorax are bright red, while the mesopleuron and the abdomen are shiny black.

This sawfly is similar to Hemichroa crocea, which has a bright orange abdomen and legs.

Larvae feed on alder (Alnus species) and birch (Betula species).

== Distribution ==
This species can be found in most of Europe.
