= Urocarpidium =

Scientific classification
- Kingdom: Plantae
- Clade: Embryophytes
- Clade: Tracheophytes
- Clade: Angiosperms
- Clade: Eudicots
- Clade: Rosids
- Order: Malvales
- Family: Malvaceae
- Genus: Urocarpidium; Ulbr.
- Species: U. albiflorum

Binomial name
- Urocarpidium albiflorum Ulbr.

Synonyms
- Malvastrum arequipense I.M.Johnst.; Sphaeralcea arequipensis (I.M.Johnst.) Krapov.; Sphaeralcea weberbaueri Krapov.

Genus of flowering plants

Urocarpidium is a genus of flowering plants in the mallow family Malvaceae, It includes a single species, Urocarpidium albiflorum, an annual plant native the dry areas of the Andes mountains in Peru and northern Chile.

Many species originally placed in this genus were moved to Fuertesimalva in 1996.
