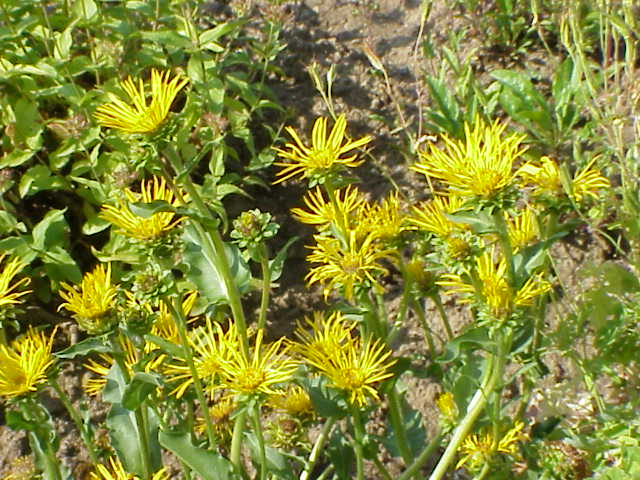
- Pyrrocoma crocea

Scientific classification
- Kingdom: Plantae
- Clade: Tracheophytes
- Clade: Angiosperms
- Clade: Eudicots
- Clade: Asterids
- Order: Asterales
- Family: Asteraceae
- Subfamily: Asteroideae
- Tribe: Astereae
- Subtribe: Machaerantherinae
- Genus: Pyrrocoma; Hook.

Synonyms
- Haplopappus sect. Pyrrocoma (Hook.) H.M.Hall; Homopappus Nutt.

= Pyrrocoma =

Genus of plants

Pyrrocoma is a genus of North American plants in the family Asteraceae. These wildflowers are sometimes known as goldenweeds.

The species of Pyrrocoma were previously considered members of genus Haplopappus but were separated out into their own genus. Pyrrocoma are perennial plants with reddish stems and yellow daisy-like flowers. They are native to western North America.

Species

- Pyrrocoma apargioides - alpineflames - CA NV UT
- Pyrrocoma carthamoides - largeflower goldenweed - British Columbia, WA OR CA NV UT ID MT WY
- Pyrrocoma clementis - tranquil goldenweed - CO WYUT
- Pyrrocoma crocea - curlyhead goldenweed - AZ NM CO WY UT
- Pyrrocoma hirta - tacky goldenweed - WA OR CA NV UT ID
- Pyrrocoma insecticruris - ID
- Pyrrocoma integrifolia - ID MT WY
- Pyrrocoma lanceolata - lanceleaf goldenweed - British Columbia, Alberta, Saskatchewan, Manitoba, ND MT ID WY CO UT ID OR NV CA TX
- Pyrrocoma liatriformis - Palouse goldenweed - WA ID OR
- Pyrrocoma linearis - OR ID NV
- Pyrrocoma lucida - sticky goldenweed - CA
- Pyrrocoma racemosa - clustered goldenweed - CA OR NV UT ID
- Pyrrocoma radiata - OR ID
- Pyrrocoma rigida - OR ID WA
- Pyrrocoma uniflora - plantain goldenweed - Alberta, Saskatchewan, MT ID WY CO UT OR CA
