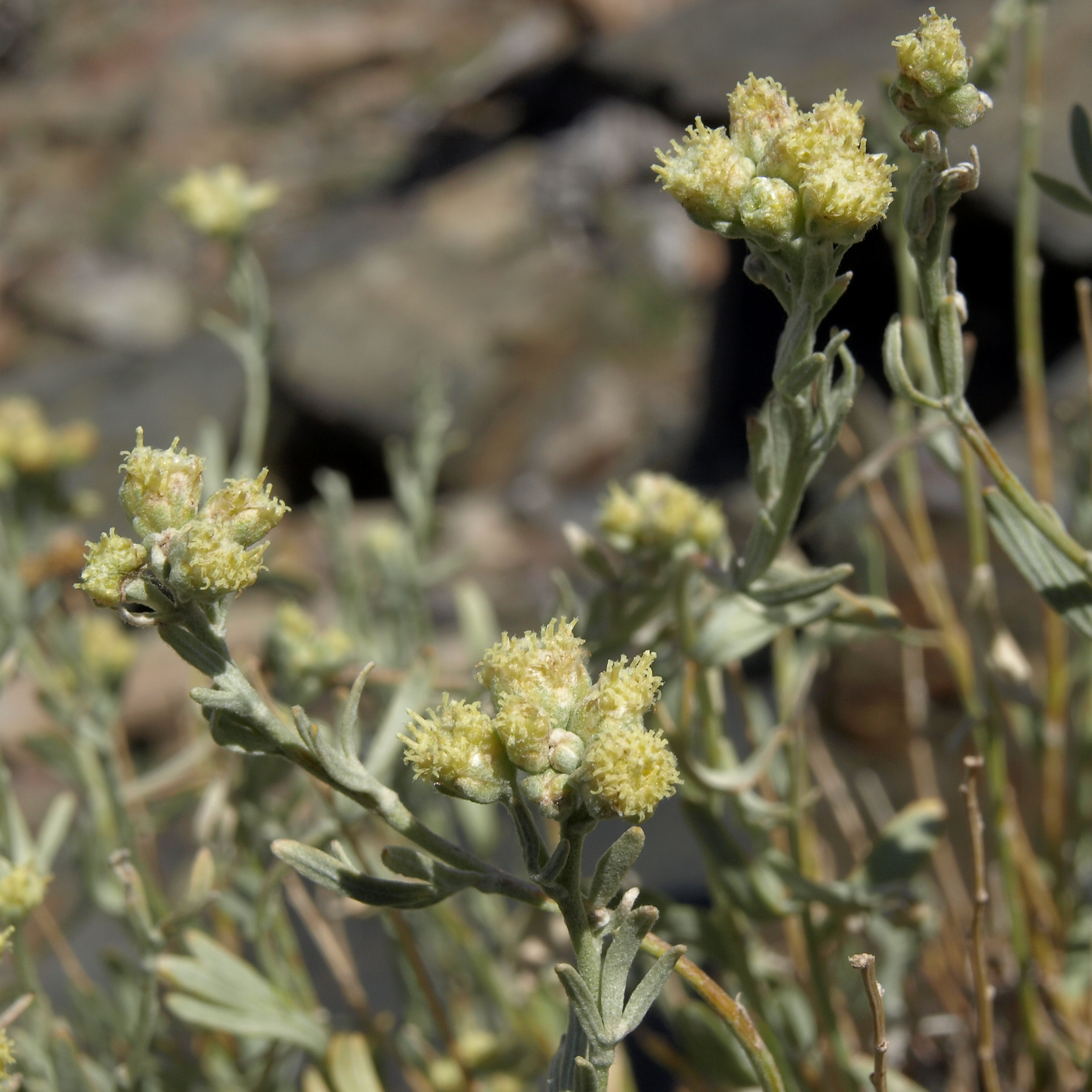
- Sphaeromeria cana flowering heads

Scientific classification
- Kingdom: Plantae
- Clade: Tracheophytes
- Clade: Angiosperms
- Clade: Eudicots
- Clade: Asterids
- Order: Asterales
- Family: Asteraceae
- Genus: Sphaeromeria
- Species: S. cana

Binomial name
- Sphaeromeria cana (D.C.Eaton) A.Heller

Synonyms
- Tanacetum canum D.C. Eaton; Artemisia albicans Sòn.Garcia et al.

= Sphaeromeria cana =

Species of plant

Sphaeromeria cana (recently proposed name Artemisia albicans) is a species of flowering plant in the family Asteraceae known by the common name gray chickensage. It is native to the western United States, where it is known from the Sierra Nevada, the adjacent desert ranges of eastern California and Nevada, and Steens Mountain of Oregon. It grows in dry, rocky mountain habitat, such as cracks and crevices, including the talus above the tree line. This is an aromatic subshrub with numerous erect branches growing up to 30 to 60 centimeters tall. It is gray-green in color and coated with woolly fibers. The leaves are linear or lance-shaped, the lower ones divided into lobes. The inflorescence is generally a cluster of flower heads lined with woolly phyllaries and containing yellow disc florets. There are no ray florets. The fruit is a ribbed achene about 2 millimeters long.
