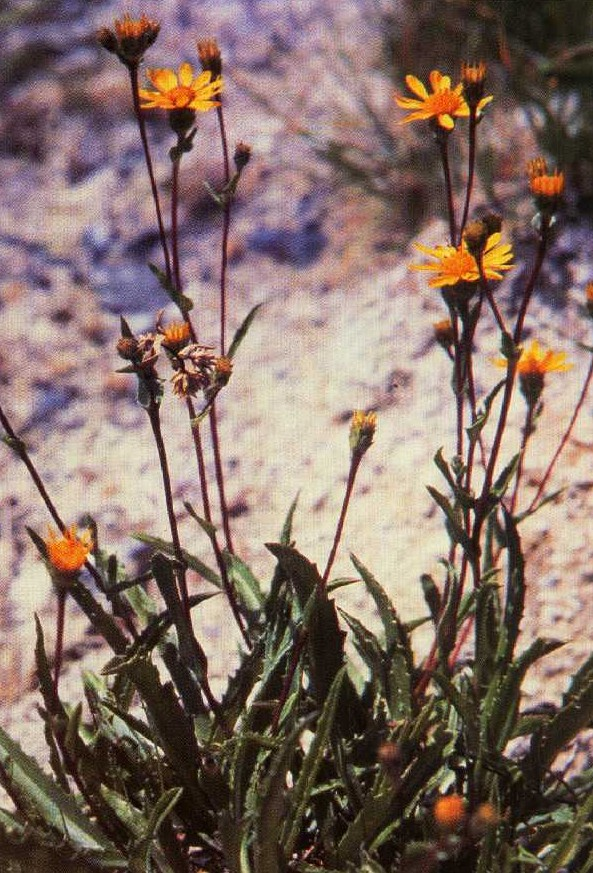

Conservation status
- Apparently Secure (NatureServe)

Scientific classification
- Kingdom: Plantae
- Clade: Tracheophytes
- Clade: Angiosperms
- Clade: Eudicots
- Clade: Asterids
- Order: Asterales
- Family: Asteraceae
- Genus: Pyrrocoma
- Species: P. lanceolata

Binomial name
- Pyrrocoma lanceolata (Hook.) Greene

Synonyms
- Haplopappus lanceolatus

= Pyrrocoma lanceolata =

Species of plant

Pyrrocoma lanceolata is a species of flowering plant in the family Asteraceae known by the common name lanceleaf goldenweed. It is native to western North America from central Canada to northeastern California to Colorado, where it grows in many types of habitat, including disturbed places and areas with wet, alkali soils. It is a widespread and variable plant. It is a perennial herb growing one or more stems up to about half a meter long. The stems are decumbent or upright, reddish, usually somewhat hairy to quite woolly, and glandular toward the ends of the stems. The largest leaves are at the base of the plant, each measuring up to 30 centimeters in maximum length. They are generally lance-shaped with sawtoothed edges. The inflorescence bears several, up to 50, flower heads lined with reddish to green phyllaries. Each contains yellow disc florets and ray florets. The fruit is an achene up to a centimeter long including its pappus.
