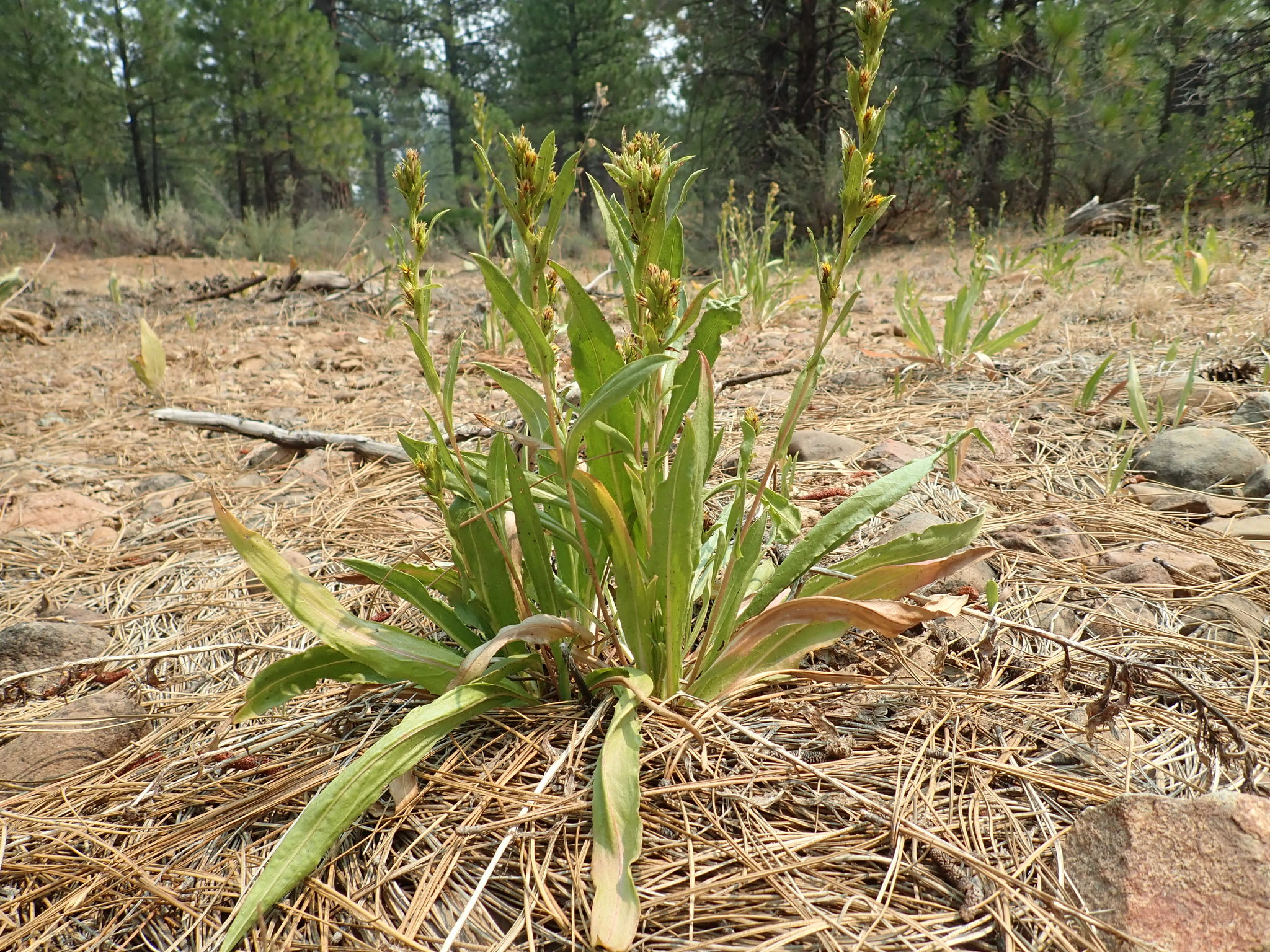

Scientific classification
- Kingdom: Plantae
- Clade: Tracheophytes
- Clade: Angiosperms
- Clade: Eudicots
- Clade: Asterids
- Order: Asterales
- Family: Asteraceae
- Genus: Pyrrocoma
- Species: P. lucida

Binomial name
- Pyrrocoma lucida (D.D.Keck) Kartesz & Gandhi

Synonyms
- Haplopappus lucidus

= Pyrrocoma lucida =

Species of plant

Pyrrocoma lucida is a species of flowering plant in the family Asteraceae known by the common names sticky goldenweed and sticky pyrrocoma. It is endemic to California, where it is known only from the northern Sierra Nevada. It grows in mountain forests and clay flats with alkali soils. This is a perennial herb growing from a taproot, producing an erect stem up to 75 centimetres (30 in) tall. It is hairless and glandular, its surface resinous and shiny. The leaves are lance-shaped with sharply toothed edges, the largest near the base of the stem reaching 25 centimetres (10 in) in length. Smaller leaves up to 10 centimetres (4 in) long occur higher on the stem. The inflorescence is a narrow spikelike array of many flower heads lined with thick, overlapping, gland-dotted phyllaries. Each head contains up to 40 yellow disc florets surrounded by a fringe of up to 20 yellow ray florets. The fruit is an achene up to a centimeter long including its pappus.
