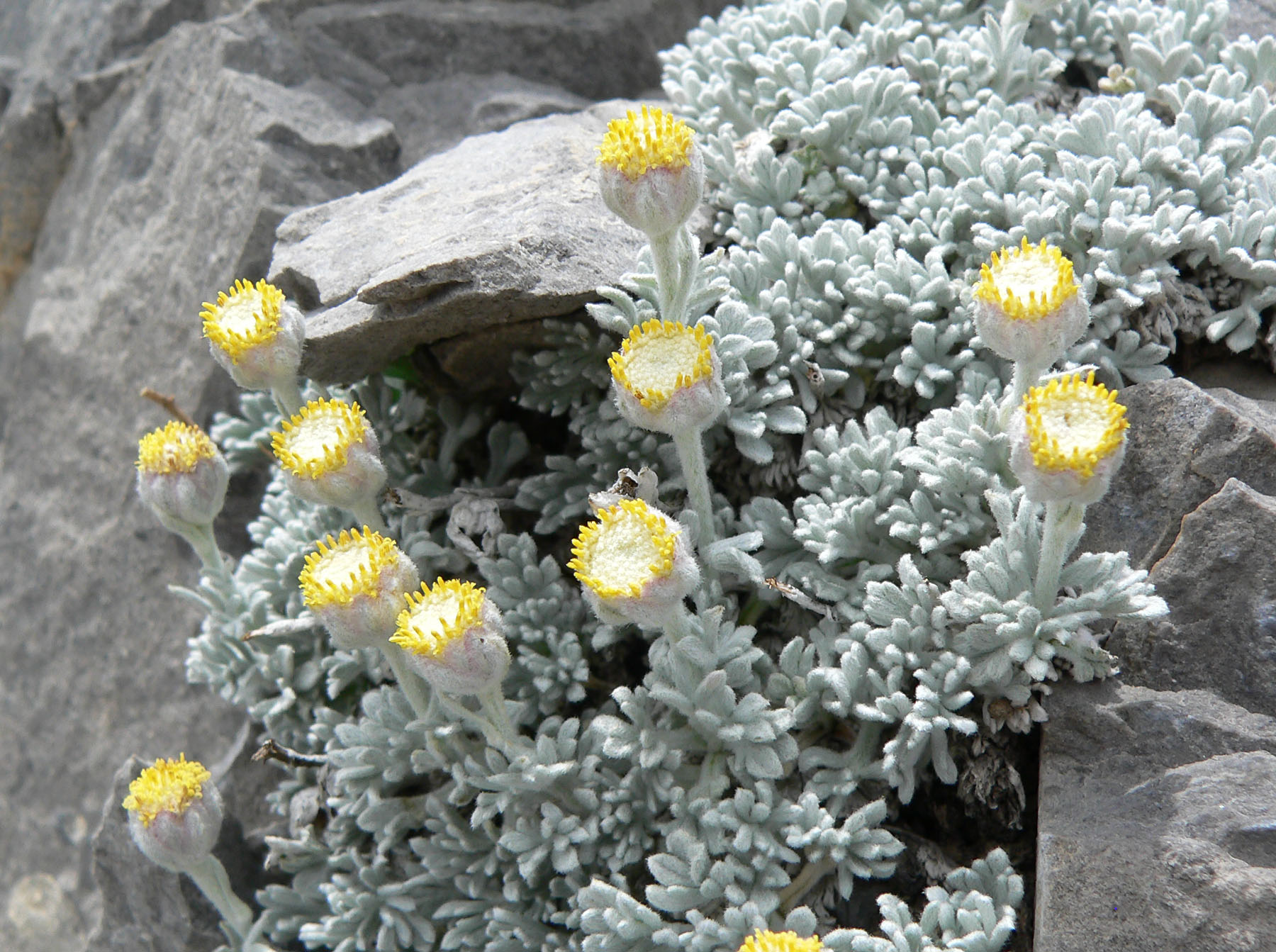
- Sphaeromeria compacta, Nevada

Scientific classification
- Kingdom: Plantae
- Clade: Tracheophytes
- Clade: Angiosperms
- Clade: Eudicots
- Clade: Asterids
- Order: Asterales
- Family: Asteraceae
- Subfamily: Asteroideae
- Tribe: Anthemideae
- Genus: Sphaeromeria; Nutt.

Type species
- Sphaeromeria capitata Nutt.

Synonyms
- Vesicarpa Rydb.

= Sphaeromeria =

Genus of plants

Sphaeromeria is a genus of flowering plants in the chamomile tribe within the sunflower family.

Sphaeromeria is native to the western United States and northwestern Mexico. Species are known generally as chickensages. The genus is closely related to Artemisia, and some authors merge the two genera into one.

Species

- Sphaeromeria argentea - silver chickensage - CO ID MT WY NV
- Sphaeromeria cana - gray chickensage - OR CA NV
- Sphaeromeria capitata - rock tansy - MT WY CO UT
- Sphaeromeria compacta - compact chickensage - NV
- Sphaeromeria diversifolia - separateleaf chickensage - NV UT
- Sphaeromeria martirensis - Baja California
- Sphaeromeria potentilloides - fivefinger chickensage - CA NV OR ID
- Sphaeromeria ruthiae - Zion chickensage - UT
- Sphaeromeria simplex - Laramie chickensage - WY
