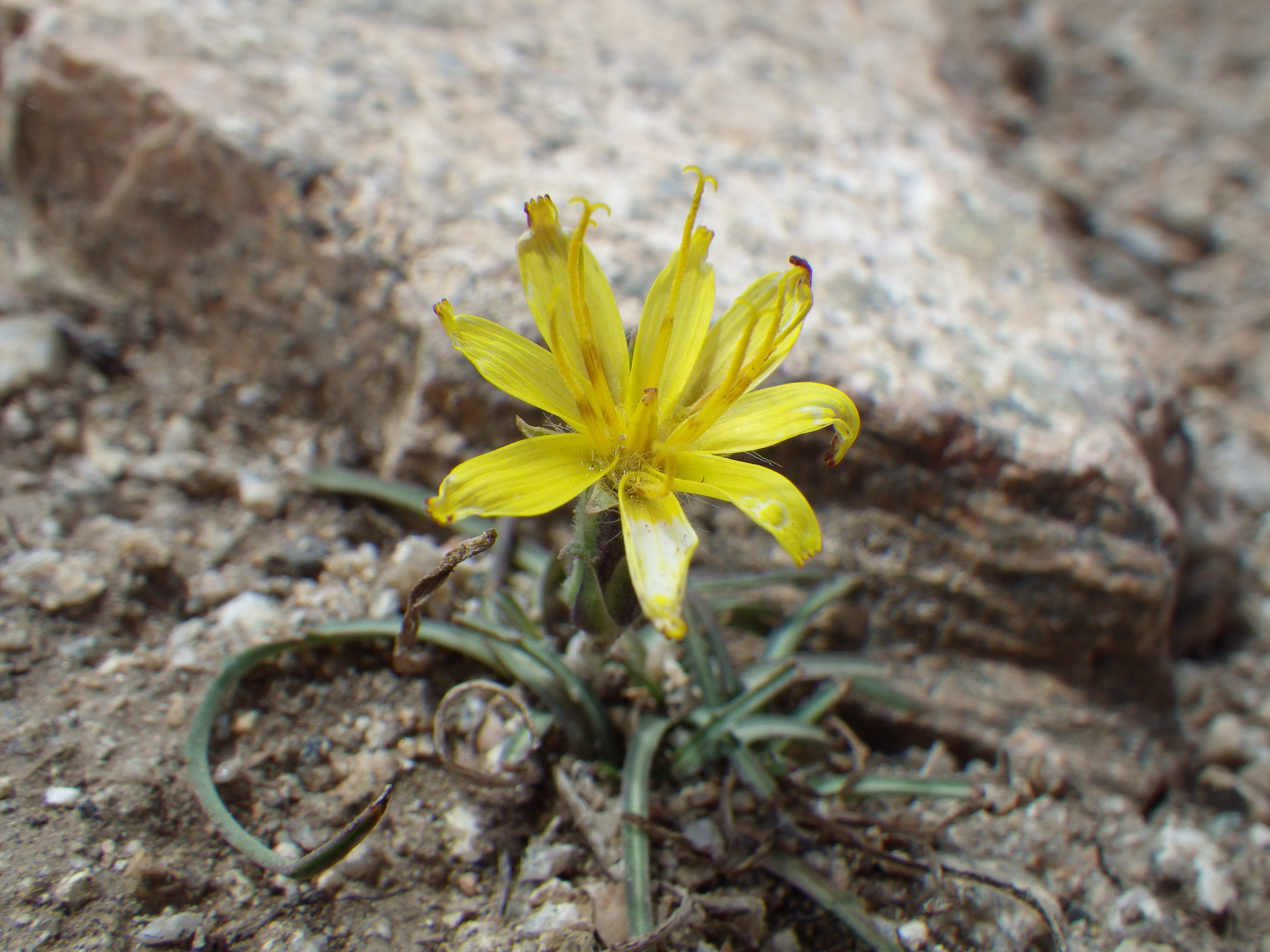

Scientific classification
- Kingdom: Plantae
- Clade: Tracheophytes
- Clade: Angiosperms
- Clade: Eudicots
- Clade: Asterids
- Order: Asterales
- Family: Asteraceae
- Genus: Pyrrocoma
- Species: P. apargioides

Binomial name
- Pyrrocoma apargioides (A.Gray) Greene

Synonyms
- Haplopappus apargioides

= Pyrrocoma apargioides =

Species of plant

Pyrrocoma apargioides is a species of flowering plant in the family Asteraceae known by the common name alpineflames. It is native to the western United States from the Sierra Nevada of California east to Utah, where it grows in the forests and meadows of high mountains. It is a perennial herb growing from a taproot and producing one or more stems to 30 centimeters in length. The stems are decumbent or upright, reddish, and hairless to slightly woolly. Most of the leaves are located around the base. They are thick and leathery, lance-shaped with large sawteeth along the edges, often center-striped in white, and measure up to 10 centimeters long. The inflorescence is usually a single flower head lined with centimeter-long phyllaries which are reddish to green with red edges. The head has a center of yellow disc florets and a fringe of ray florets which are yellow, often splashed with red along the undersides, measuring up to 1.6 centimeters in length. The fruit is an achene which may be well over a centimeter in length including its pappus.
