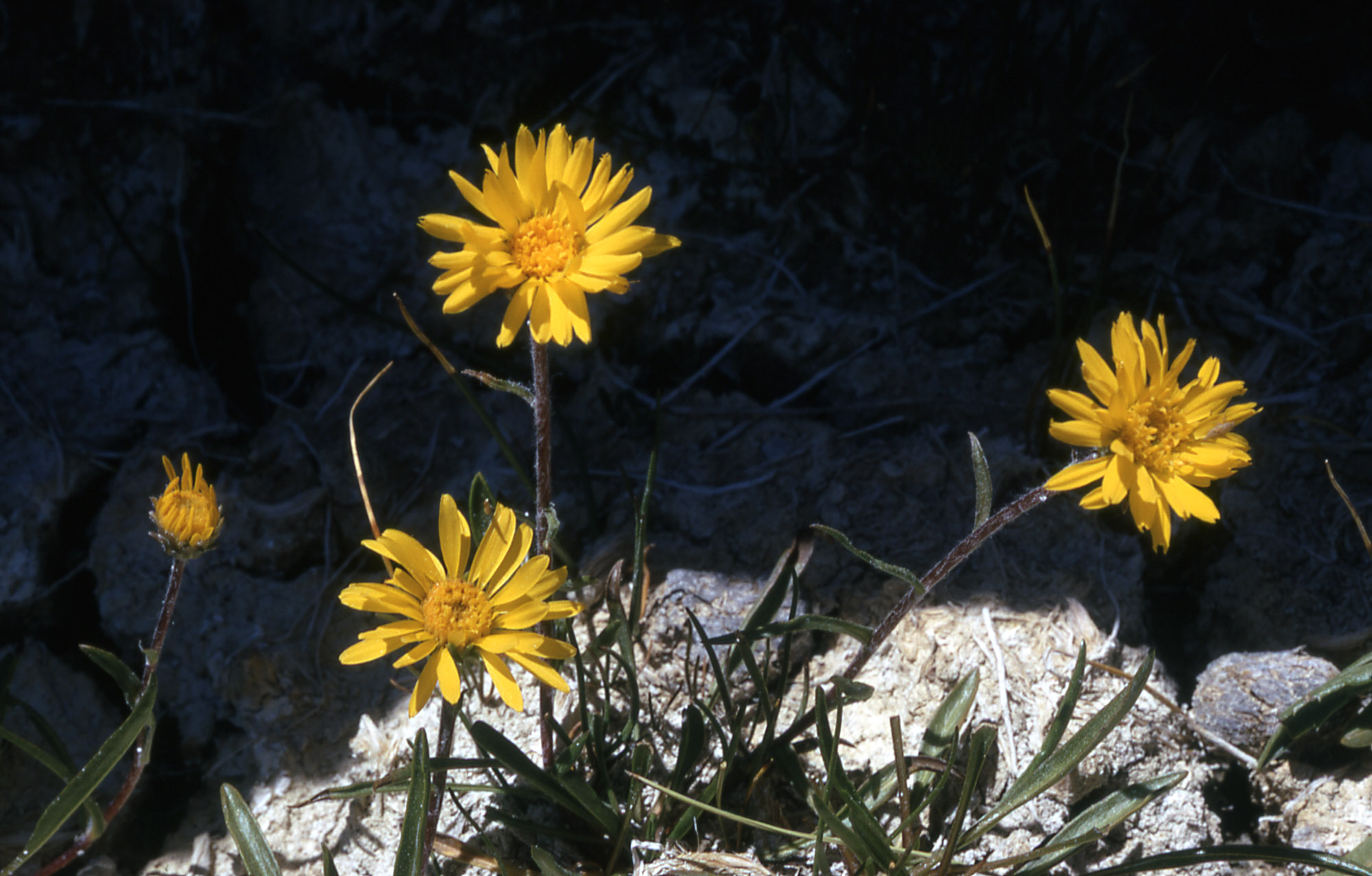

Conservation status
- Secure (NatureServe)

Scientific classification
- Kingdom: Plantae
- Clade: Tracheophytes
- Clade: Angiosperms
- Clade: Eudicots
- Clade: Asterids
- Order: Asterales
- Family: Asteraceae
- Genus: Pyrrocoma
- Species: P. uniflora

Binomial name
- Pyrrocoma uniflora (Hook.) Greene

Synonyms
- Haplopappus uniflorus

= Pyrrocoma uniflora =

Species of plant

Pyrrocoma uniflora is a species of flowering plant in the family Asteraceae known by the common name plantain goldenweed. It is native to western North America from central Canada to California to Colorado, where it grows in several types of habitat, including forest and meadows with alkali soils, such as those near hot springs. It is a perennial herb growing up to 40 centimeters tall, the stems reddish and usually with a thin to thick coating of woolly fibers. The lance-shaped, toothed leaves are usually woolly, the largest near the base of the plant reaching up to 12 centimeters in length. The inflorescence is a single flower head or a cluster of a few heads, each lined with woolly phyllaries. The head contains yellow disc and ray florets. The fruit is an achene which may be over a centimeter long including its long pappus.

There are two varieties of this species. The rare var. gossypina, sometimes called the Bear Valley haplopappus or Bear Valley pyrrocoma, is known only from the San Bernardino Mountains of California. This woolly sunflower-like plant is found in the meadows and the unique pebble plain habitat near Big Bear.
