= Sphaeromeria simplex =

Conservation status
- Imperiled (NatureServe)

Scientific classification
- Kingdom: Plantae
- Clade: Tracheophytes
- Clade: Angiosperms
- Clade: Eudicots
- Clade: Asterids
- Order: Asterales
- Family: Asteraceae
- Genus: Sphaeromeria
- Species: S. simplex

Binomial name
- Sphaeromeria simplex (A.Nelson) A.Heller

Species of plant

Sphaeromeria simplex is a species of flowering plant in the aster family known by the common names Laramie chickensage and Laramie false sagebrush. It is endemic to Wyoming in the United States.

This small perennial herb forms clumps a few centimeters tall. The leaves are divided into many lobes. The flower heads contain many yellow disc florets and no ray florets. Flowering occurs in May through August.

This plant grows on exposed limestone substrates among other cushionlike plants and some larger plants such as sagebrush. There are 11 occurrences of the plant, most of which have been discovered since 1997.
