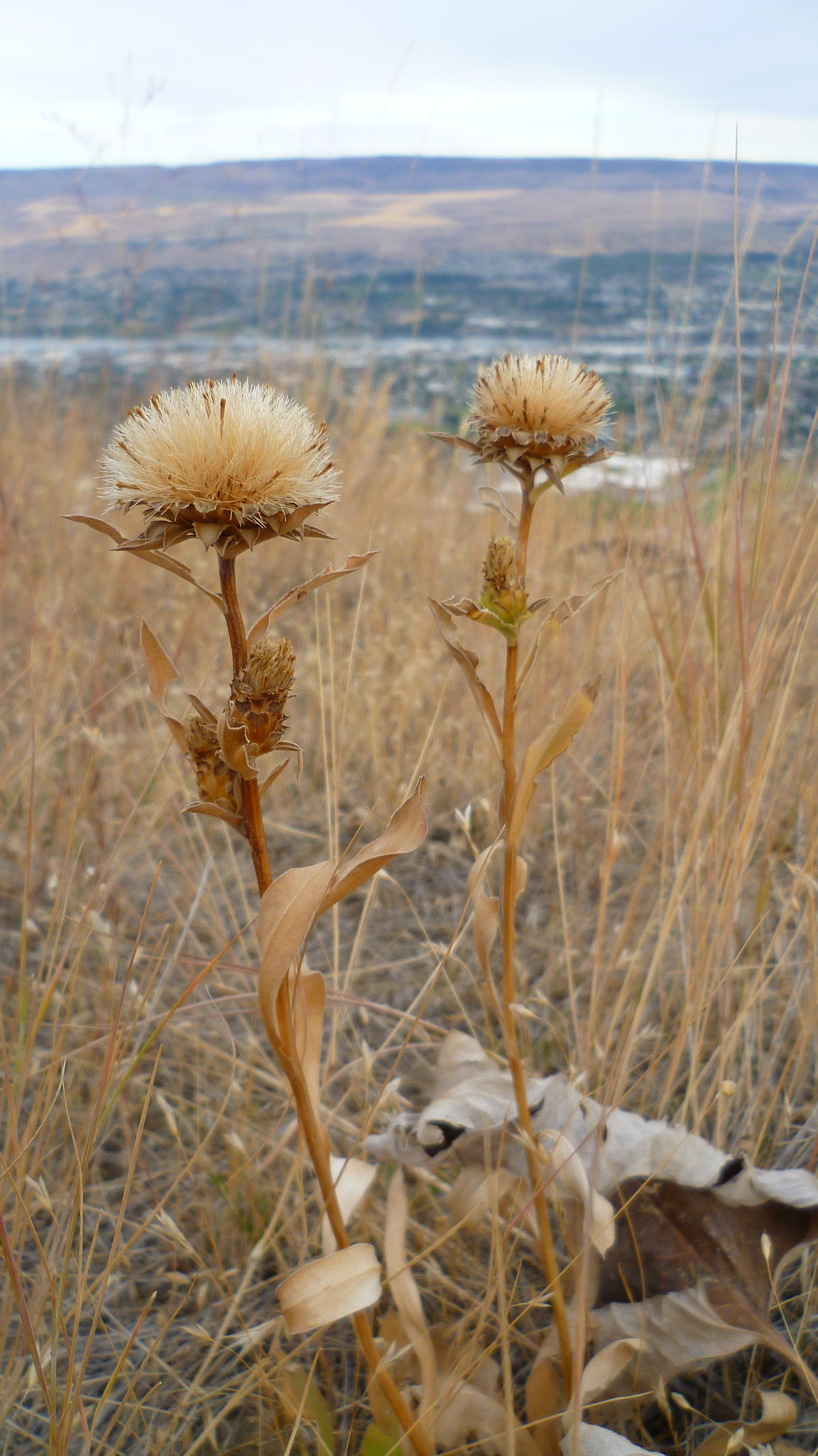

Scientific classification
- Kingdom: Plantae
- Clade: Tracheophytes
- Clade: Angiosperms
- Clade: Eudicots
- Clade: Asterids
- Order: Asterales
- Family: Asteraceae
- Genus: Pyrrocoma
- Species: P. carthamoides

Binomial name
- Pyrrocoma carthamoides Hook.

Synonyms
- Haplopappus carthamoides

= Pyrrocoma carthamoides =

Species of plant

Pyrrocoma carthamoides is a species of flowering plant in the family Asteraceae known by the common name largeflower goldenweed. It is native to western North America from British Columbia to northeastern California to Wyoming, where it is known from grassland, woodlands, forests, barren areas, and other habitat. It is a perennial herb growing from a taproot and producing one or more stems to about half a meter in maximum length, the stems reddish-green and leafy. The largest leaves are at the base of the stem, measuring up to 20 centimeters long, lance-shaped with spiny sawtoothed edges. Leaves higher on the stem are smaller and hairier. The inflorescence is a single flower head or a cluster of up to four. Each bell-shaped head is lined with phyllaries each up to 2 centimeters long. It has many yellow disc florets surrounded by a fringe of yellow ray florets up to 7 millimeters long; ray florets are occasionally absent. The fruit is an achene which may be well over a centimeter in length including its pappus.

There are three varieties of this species; var. subsquarrosa is an uncommon type known only from southwestern Montana and northwestern Wyoming.
