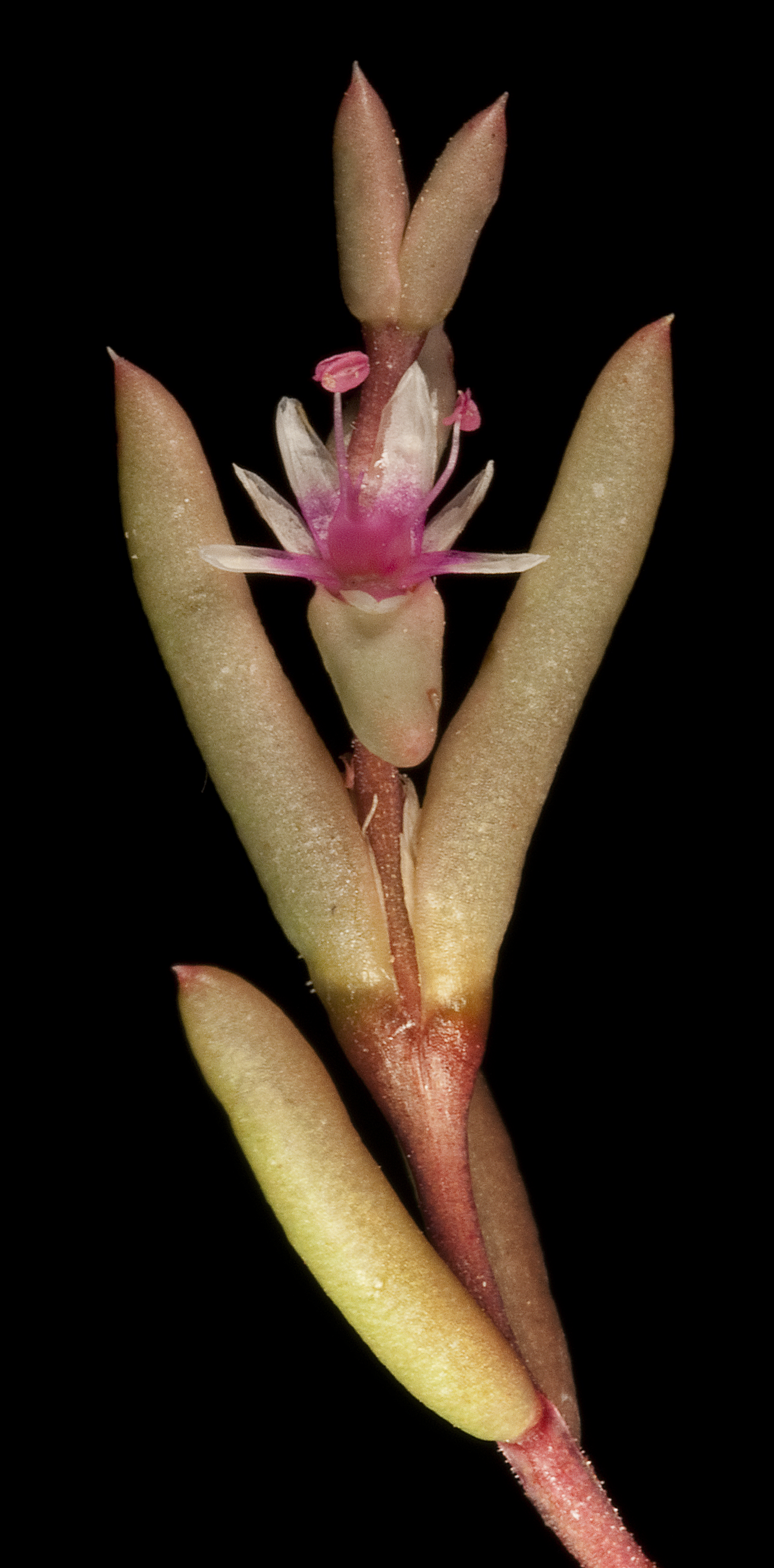
- Hemichroa diandra, synonym of Surreya diandra

Scientific classification
- Kingdom: Plantae
- Clade: Tracheophytes
- Clade: Angiosperms
- Clade: Eudicots
- Order: Caryophyllales
- Family: Amaranthaceae
- Genus: Surreya; R.Masson & G.Kadereit

= Surreya =

Genus of flowering plants

Surreya is a genus of flowering plants belonging to the family Amaranthaceae. It is also in the Polycnemoideae subfamily.

It is native to Australia.

The genus name of Surreya is in honour of Surrey Wilfrid Laurance Jacobs (1946–2009), an Australian botanist and botanical garden taxonomist in Sydney. It was first described and published in Taxon Vol.62 on page 109 in 2013.

Known species:

- Surreya diandra (R.Br.) R.Masson & G.Kadereit
- Surreya mesembryanthema (F.Muell.) R.Masson & G.Kadereit
