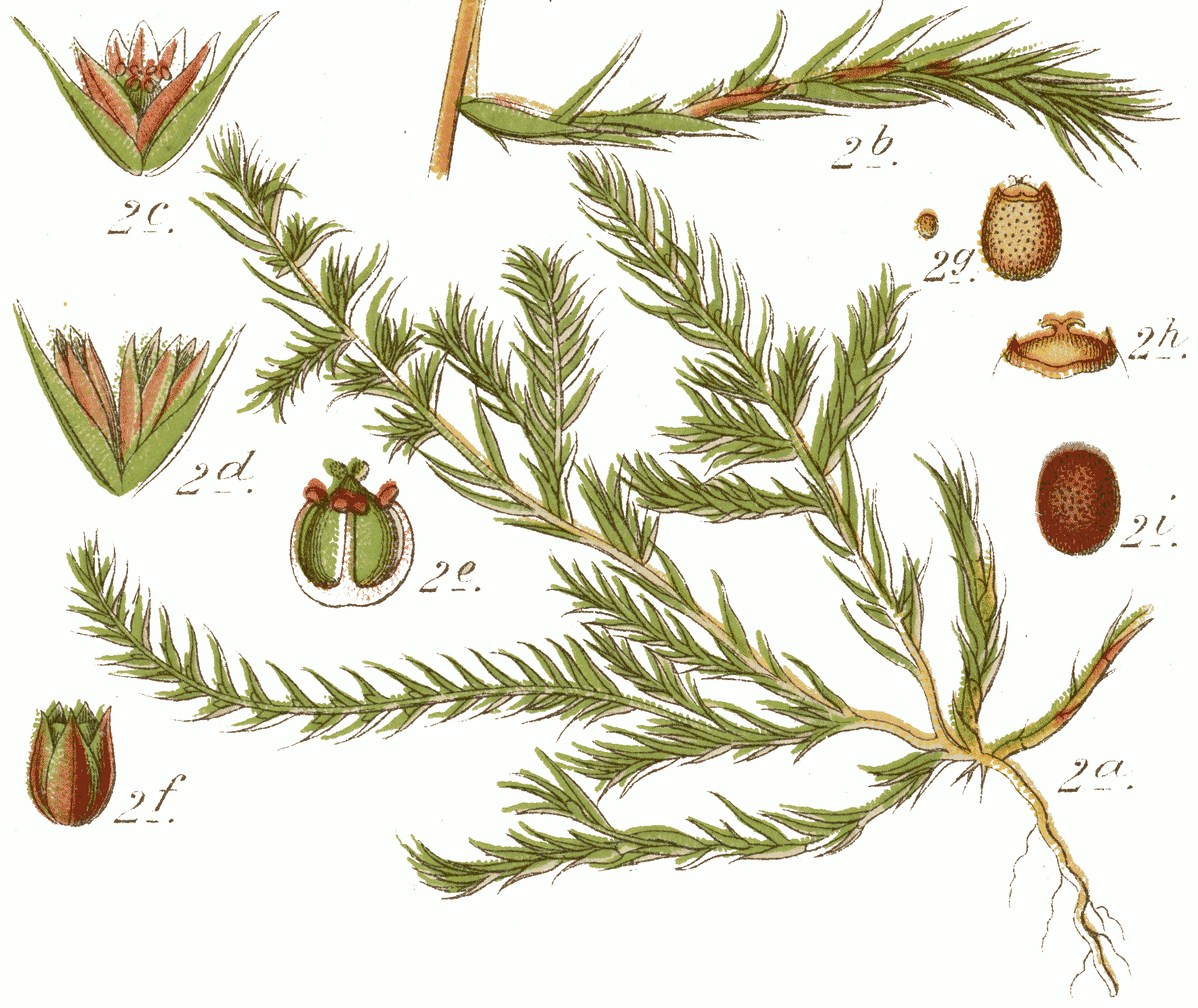
- Polycnemum arvense botanical illustration

Scientific classification
- Kingdom: Plantae
- Clade: Tracheophytes
- Clade: Angiosperms
- Clade: Eudicots
- Order: Caryophyllales
- Family: Amaranthaceae
- Subfamily: Polycnemoideae
- Tribe: Polycnemeae
- Genus: Polycnemum; L.

Species
- See text

Synonyms
- Rovillia Bubani; Selago Adans.

= Polycnemum =

Genus of plants in the amaranth family

Polycnemum is a genus of flowering plants in the family Amaranthaceae/Chenopodiaceae, native to central, eastern and southern Europe, Morocco, Algeria, Turkey, and Central Asia. Basal in its clade, it has been suggested that it be given its own family, Polycnemaceae.

== Species ==
Currently accepted species include:

- Polycnemum arvense L.
- Polycnemum fontanesii Durieu & Moq.
- Polycnemum heuffelii Láng
- Polycnemum majus A.Braun ex Bogenh.
- Polycnemum perenne Litv.
- Polycnemum verrucosum Láng
