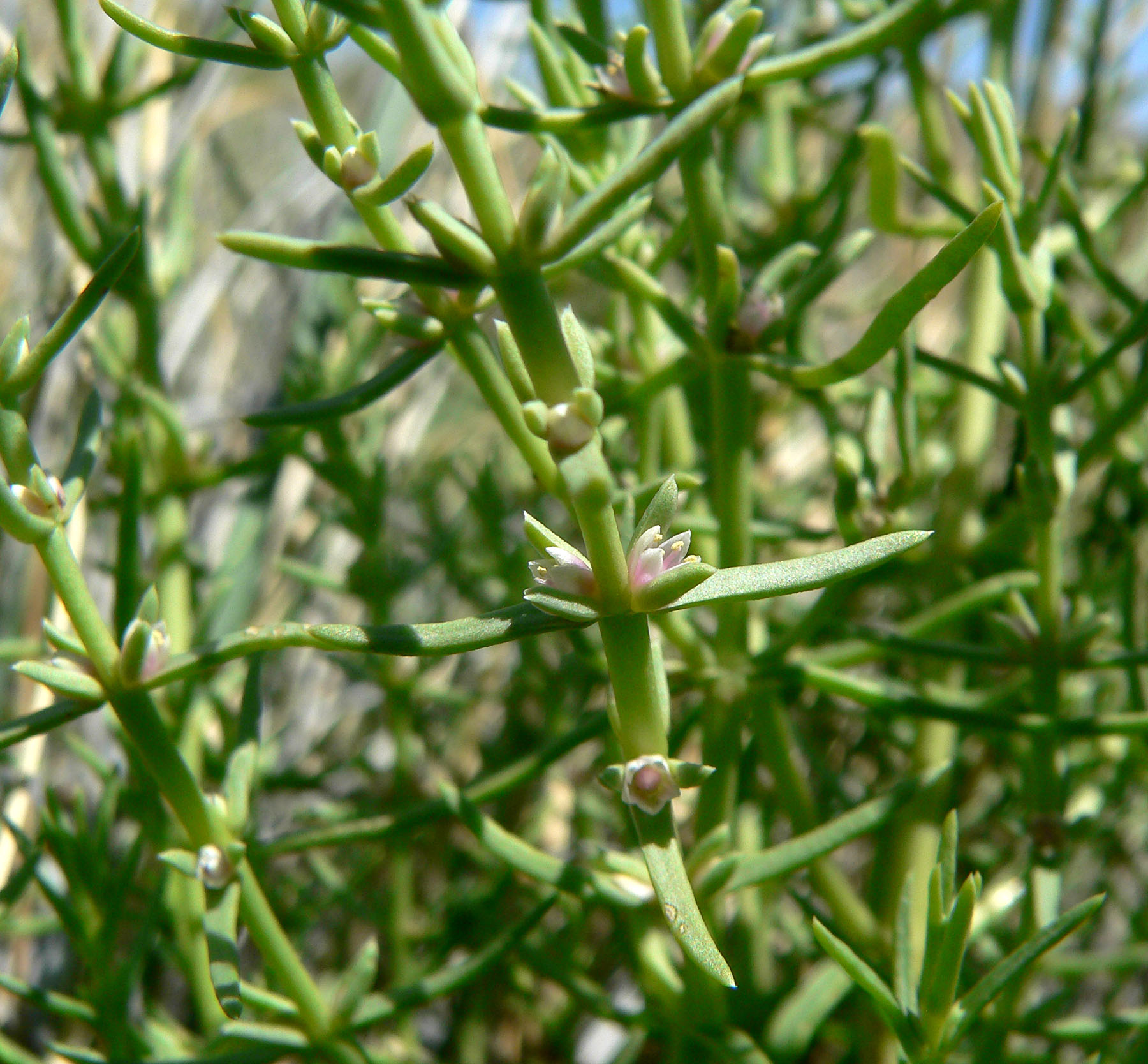
- Nitrophila occidentalis, southern Nevada

Scientific classification
- Kingdom: Plantae
- Clade: Tracheophytes
- Clade: Angiosperms
- Clade: Eudicots
- Order: Caryophyllales
- Family: Amaranthaceae
- Subfamily: Polycnemoideae
- Genus: Nitrophila; S.Watson (1871)

Species
- four, see text

= Nitrophila =

Genus of flowering plants

Nitrophila is a small genus of flowering plants in the amaranth family sometimes known by the common name niterworts. The genus name is Greek for "soda-loving", as the plant grows in alkaline or salty soils, such as those rich in borax. These are rhizomatous perennials with fleshy foliage that helps them conserve water in environments high in mineral salts. The compact, papery flowers grow in the axils of the plant where the leaves join the branches. The fruit is a utricle which contains shiny black seeds. Nitrophila species are found in temperate regions of the Americas.

== Species ==
Four species are accepted.

- Nitrophila atacamensis (Phil.) Hieron. ex Ulbr.
- Nitrophila australis Chodat & Wilczek
- Nitrophila mohavensis Munz & J.C.Roos - Amargosa niterwort
- Nitrophila occidentalis (Moq.) S.Watson - boraxweed
