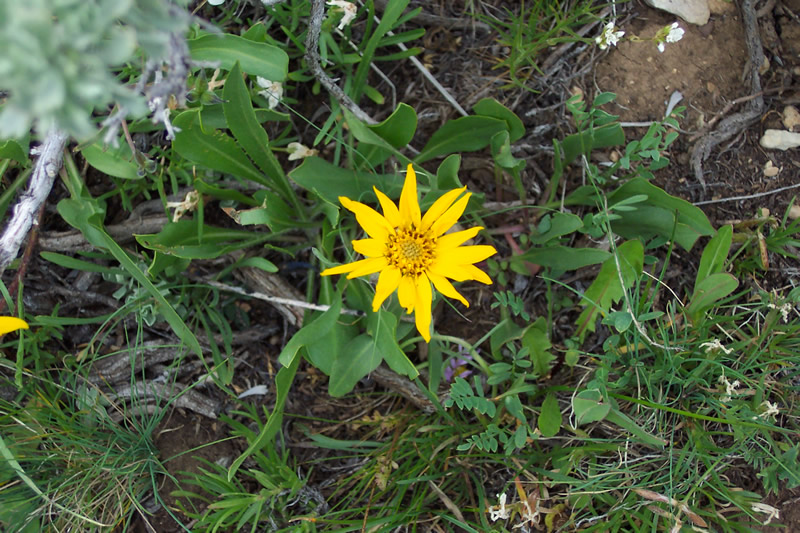
- Pyrrocoma clementis var. villosa

Conservation status
- Vulnerable (NatureServe)

Scientific classification
- Kingdom: Plantae
- Clade: Tracheophytes
- Clade: Angiosperms
- Clade: Eudicots
- Clade: Asterids
- Order: Asterales
- Family: Asteraceae
- Genus: Pyrrocoma
- Species: P. clementis

Binomial name
- Pyrrocoma clementis Rydb.

= Pyrrocoma clementis =

Species of plant

Pyrrocoma clementis is a species of flowering plant in the family Asteraceae known by the common name tranquil goldenweed. It is native to Colorado, Utah, and Wyoming in the United States.

This perennial herb produces one or more hairy stems up to 40 centimeters long. The leaves have fleshy, linear or lance-shaped blades. The lower leaves are borne on petioles and the upper ones clasp the stem at their bases. The lower leaves can reach 14 centimeters long. The inflorescence is usually a solitary flower head with a bell-shaped base up to 1.5 centimeters wide. It is lined with green or yellowish phyllaries with white edges. It contains several yellow ray florets and many disc florets. The fruit is an achene at least a centimeter long including its pappus.

In Colorado, this plant grows on alpine tundra.

There are two varieties of this plant. The rare var. villosa is endemic to Wyoming, where it grows in the Big Horn Mountains.
