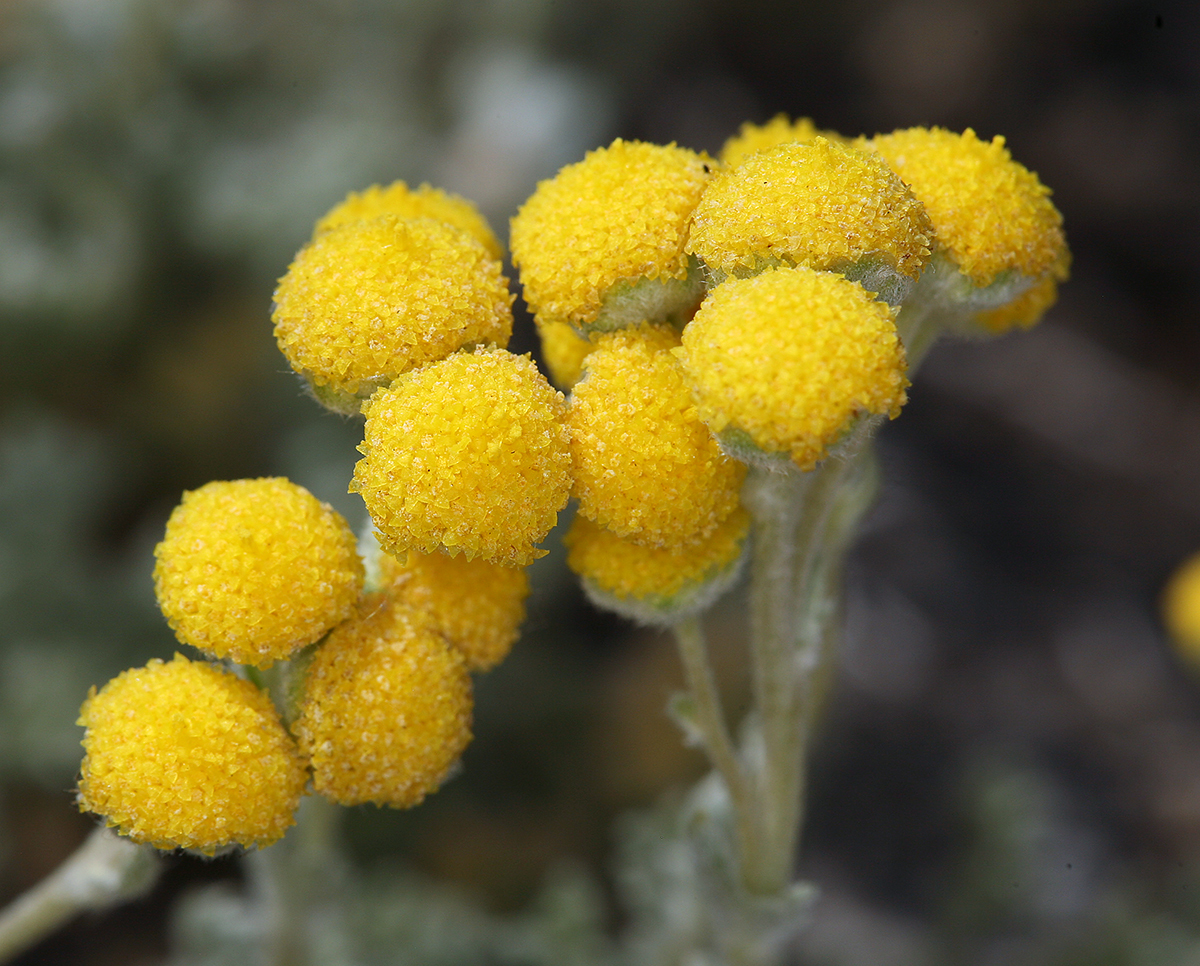

Scientific classification
- Kingdom: Plantae
- Clade: Tracheophytes
- Clade: Angiosperms
- Clade: Eudicots
- Clade: Asterids
- Order: Asterales
- Family: Asteraceae
- Genus: Sphaeromeria
- Species: S. potentilloides

Binomial name
- Sphaeromeria potentilloides (A.Gray) A.Heller

Synonyms
- Tanacetum potentilloides; Vesicarpa potentilloides

= Sphaeromeria potentilloides =

Species of plant

Sphaeromeria potentilloides is a species of flowering plant in the family Asteraceae known by the common names cinquefoil false sagebrush and fivefinger chickensage. It is native to the western United States, where it is known from the Great Basin and surrounding regions. It grows in moist areas, especially places with alkaline substrates such as hot springs and seeps. This perennial herb produces spreading stems from a woody caudex. The gray-green woolly leaves are divided into several lobes or leaflets which are subdivided into smaller lobes. The inflorescence is generally a cluster of a few flower heads lined with hairy phyllaries and containing yellow disc florets. There are no ray florets. The fruit is a tiny ribbed achene which swells up and becomes gluey in texture when it is moistened.
