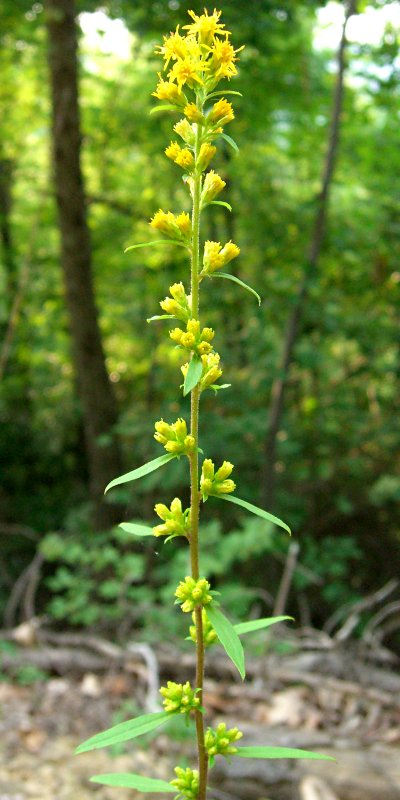

Scientific classification
- Kingdom: Plantae
- Clade: Tracheophytes
- Clade: Angiosperms
- Clade: Eudicots
- Clade: Asterids
- Order: Asterales
- Family: Asteraceae
- Genus: Solidago
- Species: S. erecta

Binomial name
- Solidago erecta Banks ex Pursh

Synonyms
- Solidago porteri Small; Solidago speciosa var. erecta (Banks ex Pursh) MacMill.

= Solidago erecta =

Species of flowering plant

Solidago erecta is a species of goldenrod known by the common names showy goldenrod and slender goldenrod. It is native to the eastern United States, from Massachusetts west to Indiana, and south as far as Georgia and Mississippi.

Solidago erecta is a perennial herb up to 120 cm (4 feet) tall. One plant can produce as many as 350 small yellow flower heads in an elongated array.

== Galls ==
This species is host to the fillowing insect induced galls:

- Asphondylia monacha Osten Sacken, 1869 (summer generation)
- Asteromyia carbonifera (Osten Sacken, 1862)
- Procecidochares atra (Loew, 1862) (summer and autumn generations)

external link to gallformers
