= Hemichroa pentandra =

Scientific classification
- Kingdom: Plantae
- Clade: Tracheophytes
- Clade: Angiosperms
- Clade: Eudicots
- Order: Caryophyllales
- Family: Amaranthaceae
- Genus: Hemichroa
- Species: H. pentandra

Binomial name
- Hemichroa pentandra R.Br., 1810

Species of plant

Hemichroa pentandra, commonly known as trailing hemichroa, trailing saltstar or trailing jointweed, is a prostrate perennial herb in the amaranth family. It is endemic to Australia. A succulent halophyte, it grows to about 10 cm in height and 30 cm wide. It has tiny, inconspicuous white flowers, surrounded by papery bracts, which grow in the angle between the stem and the 12 mm long leaves. It is found in coastal salt marshes and around salt lakes.
