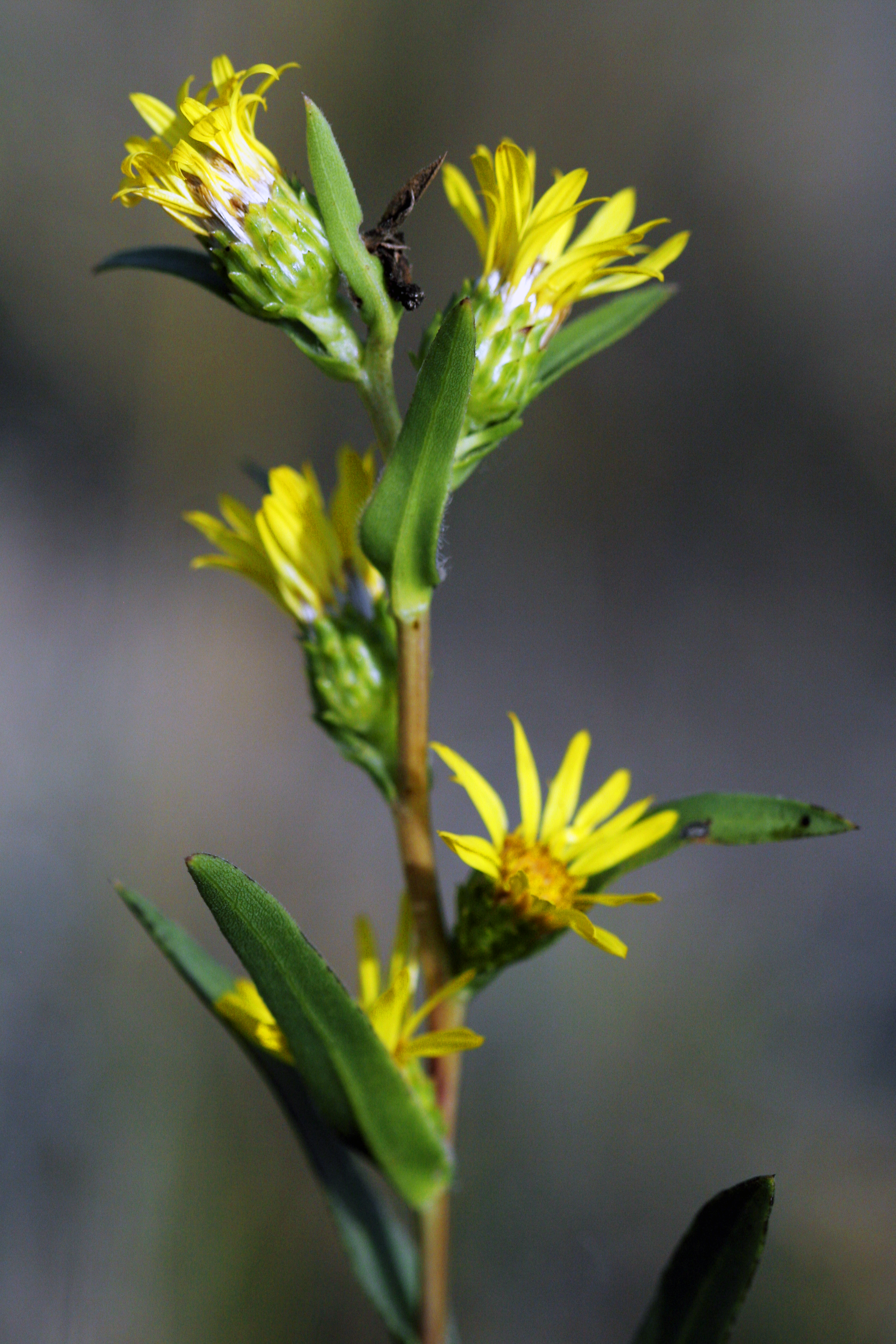

Scientific classification
- Kingdom: Plantae
- Clade: Tracheophytes
- Clade: Angiosperms
- Clade: Eudicots
- Clade: Asterids
- Order: Asterales
- Family: Asteraceae
- Genus: Pyrrocoma
- Species: P. racemosa

Binomial name
- Pyrrocoma racemosa (Nutt.) Torr. & A.Gray

Synonyms
- Haplopappus racemosus

= Pyrrocoma racemosa =

Species of plant

Pyrrocoma racemosa is a species of flowering plant in the family Asteraceae known by the common name clustered goldenweed. It is native to the western United States, where it grows in many types of habitat. It is quite variable in morphology, and there are several varieties which are sometimes hard to tell apart. In general, it is a perennial herb usually producing two or more mostly erect stems reaching maximum heights between 15 and 90 centimeters. The stems are reddish or brownish in color, leafy or not, and hairless to quite woolly. The longest leaves are located in tufts around the base of the stems. They are lance-shaped to oval, smooth-edged, wavy, or deeply spine-toothed, and may exceed 30 centimeters in length. Basal leaves are borne on woolly petioles. Leaves located higher on the stem lack petioles and may clasp the stem at their bases. The inflorescence is a cluster of several flower heads lined with phyllaries which may be over a centimeter long and are hairy to hairless in texture. Each head contains many yellow disc florets and a fringe of several yellow ray florets. The fruit is an achene which may be over a centimeter long including its pappus.
