= Hemichroa (plant) =

Scientific classification
- Kingdom: Plantae
- Clade: Tracheophytes
- Clade: Angiosperms
- Clade: Eudicots
- Order: Caryophyllales
- Family: Amaranthaceae
- Subfamily: Polycnemoideae
- Genus: Hemichroa; R.Br., 1810

Species
- Hemichroa diandra; Hemichroa mesembryanthema; Hemichroa pentandra

Genus of succulents

Hemichroa is a small genus of plants in the family Amaranthaceae containing three species. It is endemic to Australia.

== Description ==
Hemichroa is a genus of succulent, halophytic, perennial herbs and shrubs. They are found coastally as well as in salt marshes and around inland salt lakes.
