= Oskar Eberhard Ulbrich =

German botanist (1879–1952)

Oskar Eberhard Ulbrich (17 September 1879 – 4 November 1952) was a German botanist and mycologist.

Ulbrich was born in Berlin. He studied natural sciences at the University of Berlin, where his instructors included Adolf Engler (1844–1930) and Simon Schwendener (1829–1919). In 1926 he became a curator and professor at the Botanical Museum in Berlin, where in 1938 he was appointed director of the Hauptpilzstelle.

Known for his intrafamilial investigations of the botanical families Amaranthaceae, Chenopodiaceae and Caryophyllaceae, in 1934 he subdivided Chenopodiaceae into eight subfamilies; Salicornioideae, Polycnemoideae, Chenopodioideae, Salsoloideae, et al.

In 1911 he introduced usage of a color scheme to indicate geographical regions on herbarium specimens and fascicles. The plant genus Ulbrichia from the family Malvaceae was named after him by Ignatz Urban (1848–1931).

== Selected publications ==
- Die höheren Pilze: Basidiomycetes, third edition 1928 (with Gustav Lindau 1866–1923) - The higher fungi, Basidiomycetes.
- Pflanzenkunde, 1920.
- Chenopodiaceae. - In: Adolf Engler & Karl Anton Eugen Prantl: Die natürlichen Pflanzenfamilien, second edition. volume 16c: S.379-585, Duncker & Humblot, Berlin 1934.
