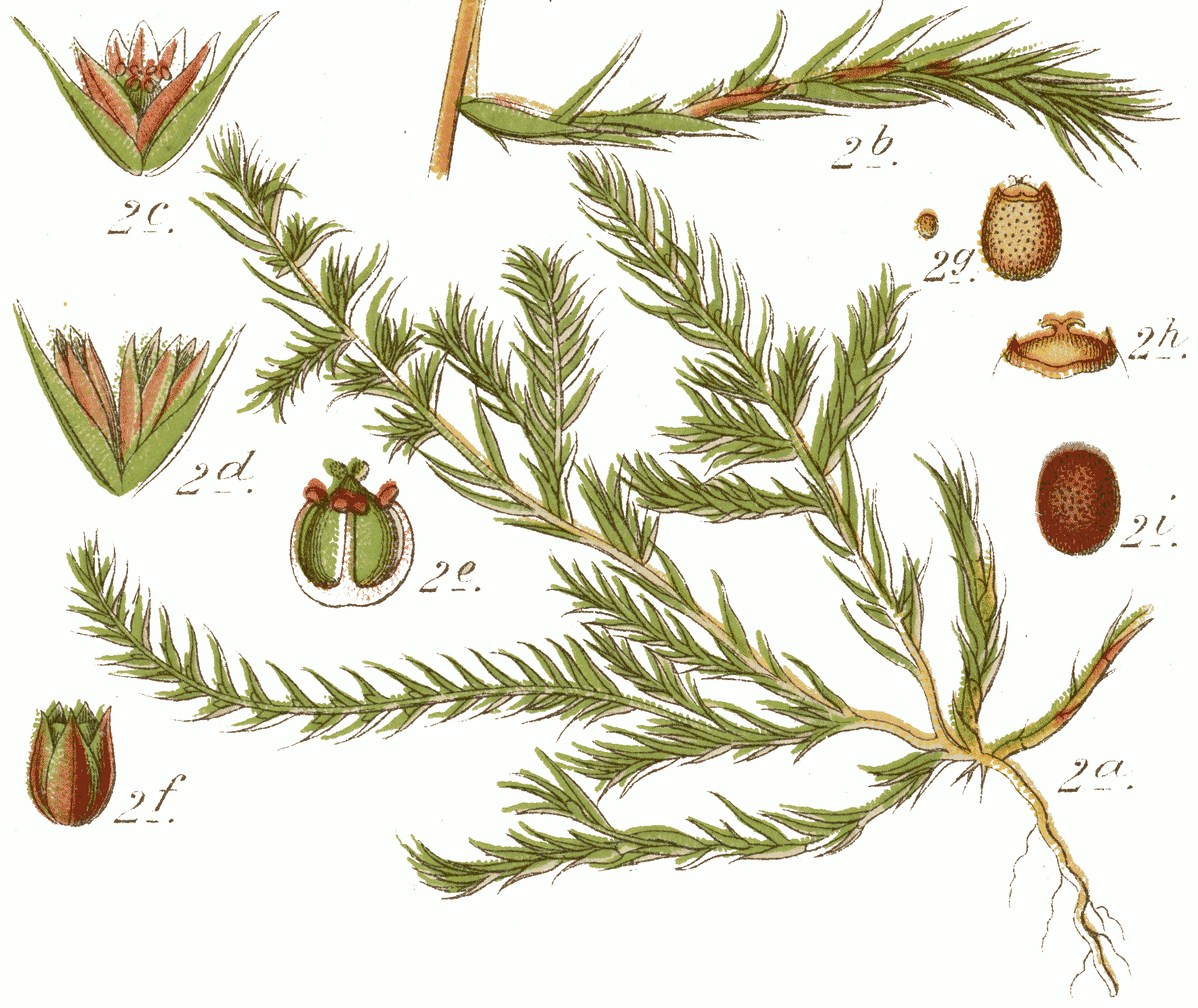

Scientific classification
- Kingdom: Plantae
- Clade: Tracheophytes
- Clade: Angiosperms
- Clade: Eudicots
- Order: Caryophyllales
- Family: Amaranthaceae
- Genus: Polycnemum
- Species: P. arvense

Binomial name
- Polycnemum arvense L.

= Polycnemum arvense =

Species of flowering plant

Polycnemum arvense is a species of flowering plant belonging to the family Amaranthaceae.

It is native to Europe to China.
