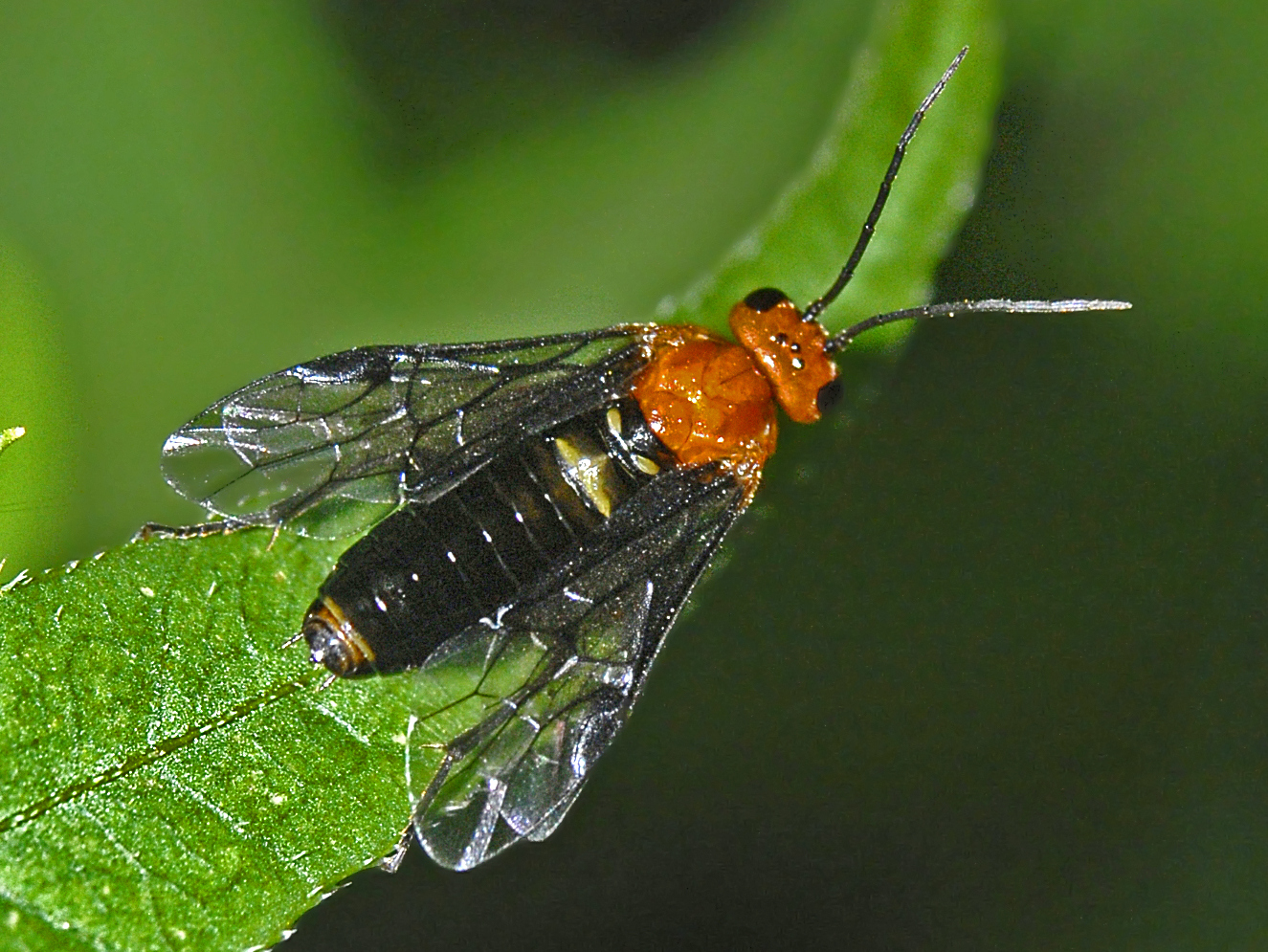
- Hemichroa australis

Scientific classification
- Kingdom: Animalia
- Phylum: Arthropoda
- Clade: Pancrustacea
- Class: Insecta
- Order: Hymenoptera
- Suborder: Symphyta
- Family: Tenthredinidae
- Subfamily: Nematinae
- Tribe: Nematini
- Genus: Hemichroa; Stephens, 1835

= Hemichroa (sawfly) =

Genus of sawflies

Hemichroa is a genus of sawflies in the family Tenthredinidae.

== Species ==
- Hemichroa australis (Serville, 1823)
- Hemichroa crocea (Geoffroy in Fourcroy, 1785)
- Hemichroa monticola Ermolenko, 1960
