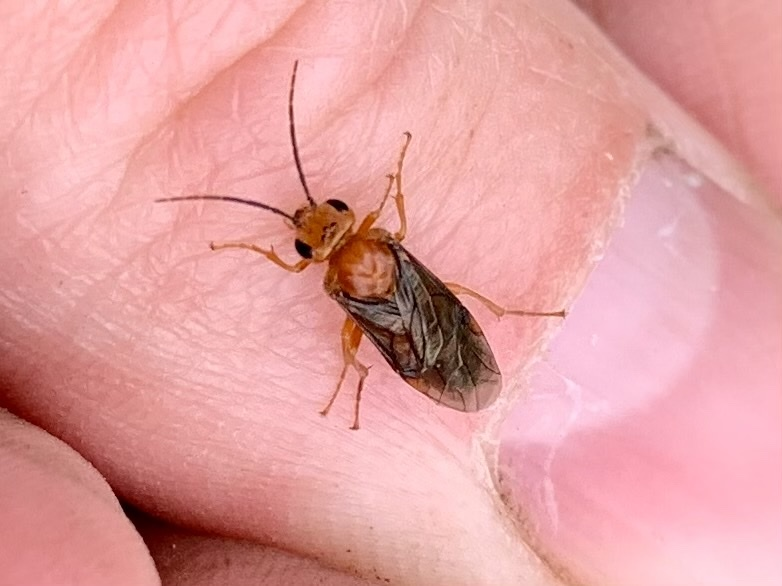

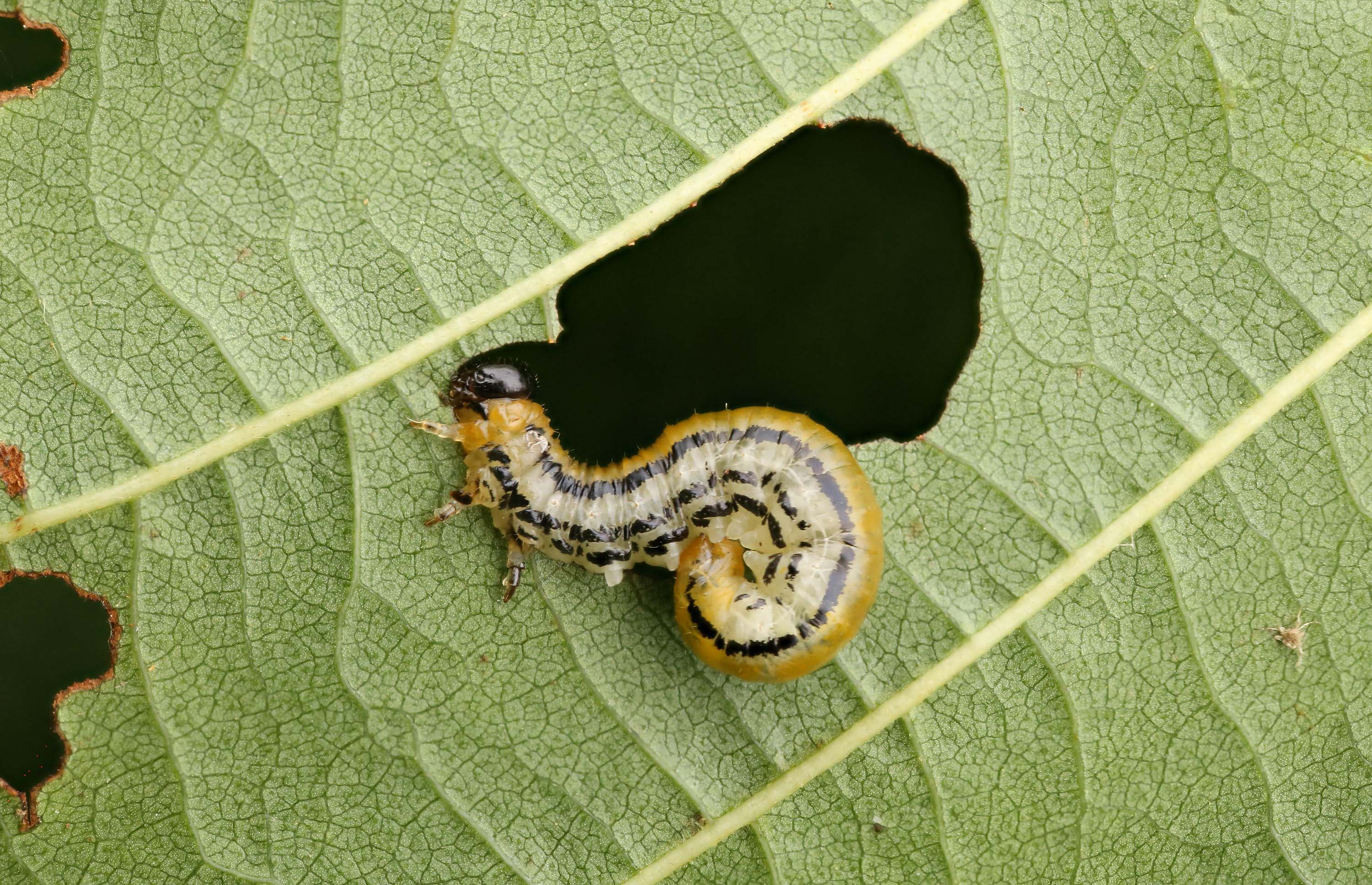
- Adult (top). Larva feeding on alder leaf (bottom)

Scientific classification
- Domain: Eukaryota
- Kingdom: Animalia
- Phylum: Arthropoda
- Class: Insecta
- Order: Hymenoptera
- Suborder: Symphyta
- Family: Tenthredinidae
- Genus: Hemichroa
- Species: H. crocea

Binomial name
- Hemichroa crocea Geoffroy in Fourcroy, 1785

= Hemichroa crocea =

Species of sawfly

Hemichroa crocea, the striped alder sawfly or banded alder sawfly, is a species of sawfly in the family Tenthredinidae. It is probably native in Europe and has been introduced to North America. The larvae feed on the foliage of several species of alder and sometimes on birch, hazel and willow.

== Description ==
The adult striped alder sawfly has an orange-red thorax, a black abdomen and translucent wings. The larvae resemble caterpillars, and when fully grown are about 20 mm (0.8 in) long. They have black heads and yellowish bodies with a dark brown stripe on each side of the dorsum, and two rows of dark brown markings on each side.

== Life cycle ==
The first generation of striped alder sawflies are on the wing in late May. The eggs are laid in slits beside the midrib of leaves of the host plant. When these hatch, the caterpillars are gregarious and feed together, in time eating the whole leaf apart from the midrib and veins, and moving on to the next leaf. These larvae reach full size in July and descend to the ground where they spend the winter in a thin-walled prepupal cocoon made of sand and soil particles cemented together. A new batch of adults appears in late July and August; larvae from this second generation are present on the host plants in August and September, before they too spend the winter as a prepupa in the ground.

== Hosts ==
The larvae of this sawfly feed on several species of alder including alder (Alnus glutinosa), grey alder (Alnus incana) and green alder (Alnus viridis), as well as silver birch (Betula pendula), and hazel (Corylus avellana) and willow.

== Distribution ==
The striped alder sawfly is probably native to Europe and found in southern Canada and northern United States, where it is extending its range across the continent.
