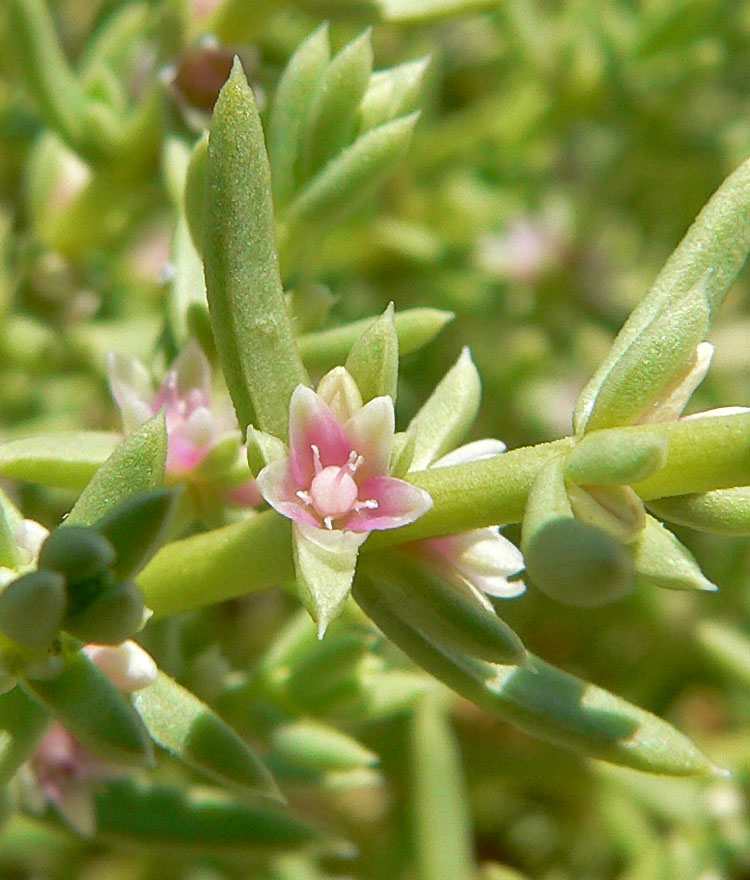

Scientific classification
- Kingdom: Plantae
- Clade: Tracheophytes
- Clade: Angiosperms
- Clade: Eudicots
- Order: Caryophyllales
- Family: Amaranthaceae
- Genus: Nitrophila
- Species: N. occidentalis

Binomial name
- Nitrophila occidentalis (Moq.) S.Watson

Synonyms
- Banalia occidentalis

= Nitrophila occidentalis =

Species of flowering plant

Nitrophila occidentalis is a species of flowering plant in the family Amaranthaceae known by the common name boraxweed and sometimes western niterwort. It is native to the western United States and northern Mexico, where it can be found in habitat with moist alkaline soils, such as salt pans. It is a rhizomatous perennial herb producing decumbent or erect stems up to about 30 centimeters tall. The stems have paired branches lined with oppositely arranged, fleshy, linear or oblong green leaves up to 1.6 centimeters in length. Flowers occur in the leaf axils, alone or in clusters of up to 3, accompanied by small bracts. The flower lacks petals but has five pointed sepals 1 or 2 millimeters long which are white or pink in color, fading white with age.
