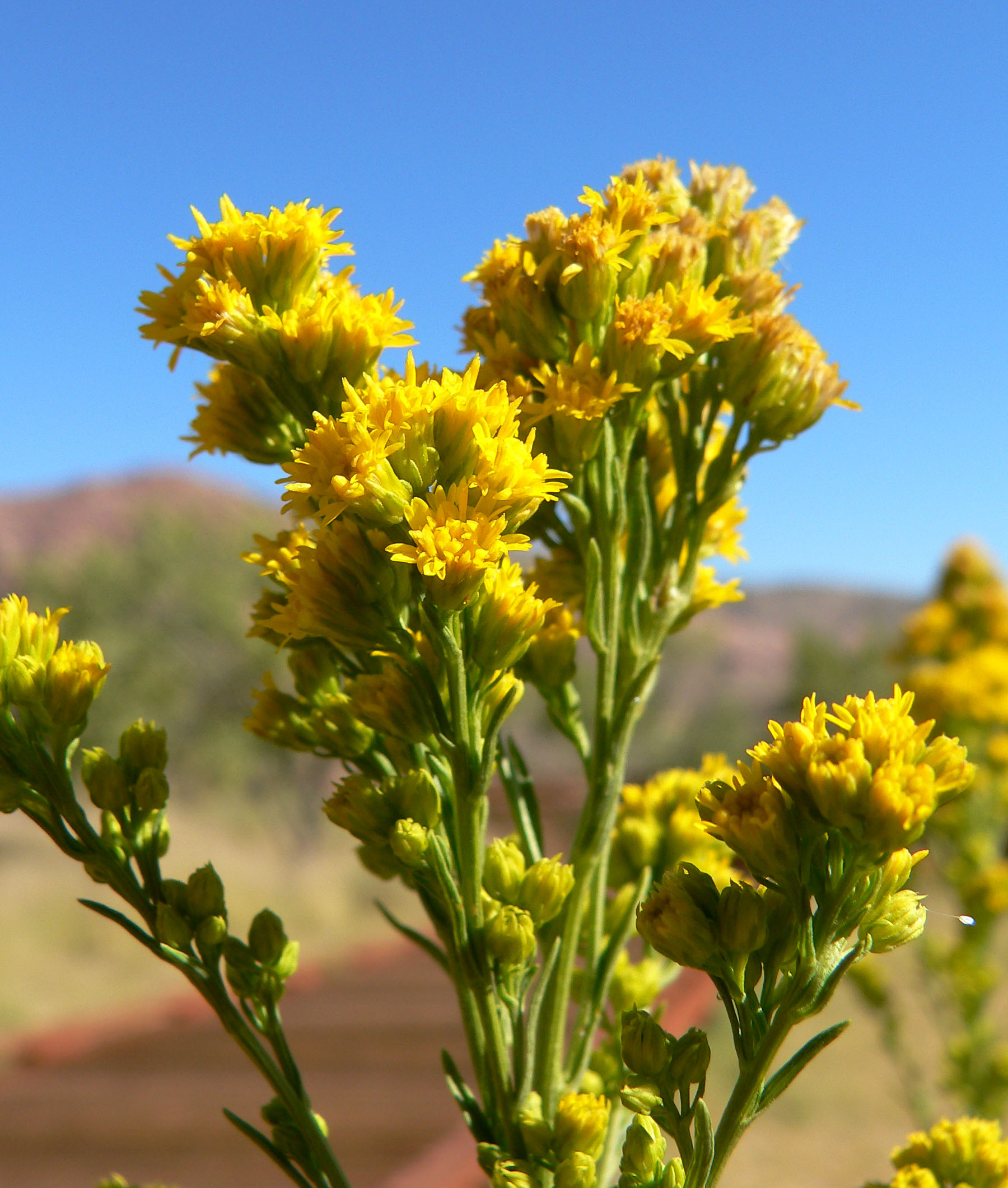

Scientific classification
- Kingdom: Plantae
- Clade: Tracheophytes
- Clade: Angiosperms
- Clade: Eudicots
- Clade: Asterids
- Order: Asterales
- Family: Asteraceae
- Genus: Solidago
- Species: S. spectabilis

Binomial name
- Solidago spectabilis (D.C.Eaton) A.Gray

Synonyms
- Aster rothrockii Kuntze

= Solidago spectabilis =

Species of flowering plant

Solidago spectabilis is a species of goldenrod known by the common names Nevada goldenrod, basin goldenrod, and showy goldenrod. It is native to the western United States in the Great Basin and surrounding areas. It is found in California, Arizona, Nevada, Oregon, and Utah. There are historical records saying it once grew in southwestern Idaho, but is now extirpated there. This variety has also been seen in the western Montana county of Sanders.

Solidago spectabilis grows in moist habitats, including bogs, meadows, seeps, streambanks, hot springs, and wet areas on alkali flats. It is a rhizomatous perennial herb producing one or more upright stems that can reach two meters (5 feet) in maximum height. It is mostly hairless, but can have occasional patches of rough hairs. There is a basal rosette of fleshy, lance-shaped leaves measuring up to 25 centimeters (10 inches), the blades borne on winged petioles. The edges may be wavy or slightly toothed. Leaves higher up the stem are smaller and usually smooth-edged. The inflorescence is a large upright or arching array of many flower heads, with some containing up to 100 heads. Each flower head contains 8-22 yellow disc florets surrounded 5-15 narrow yellow ray florets each no more than 4 millimeters long.
