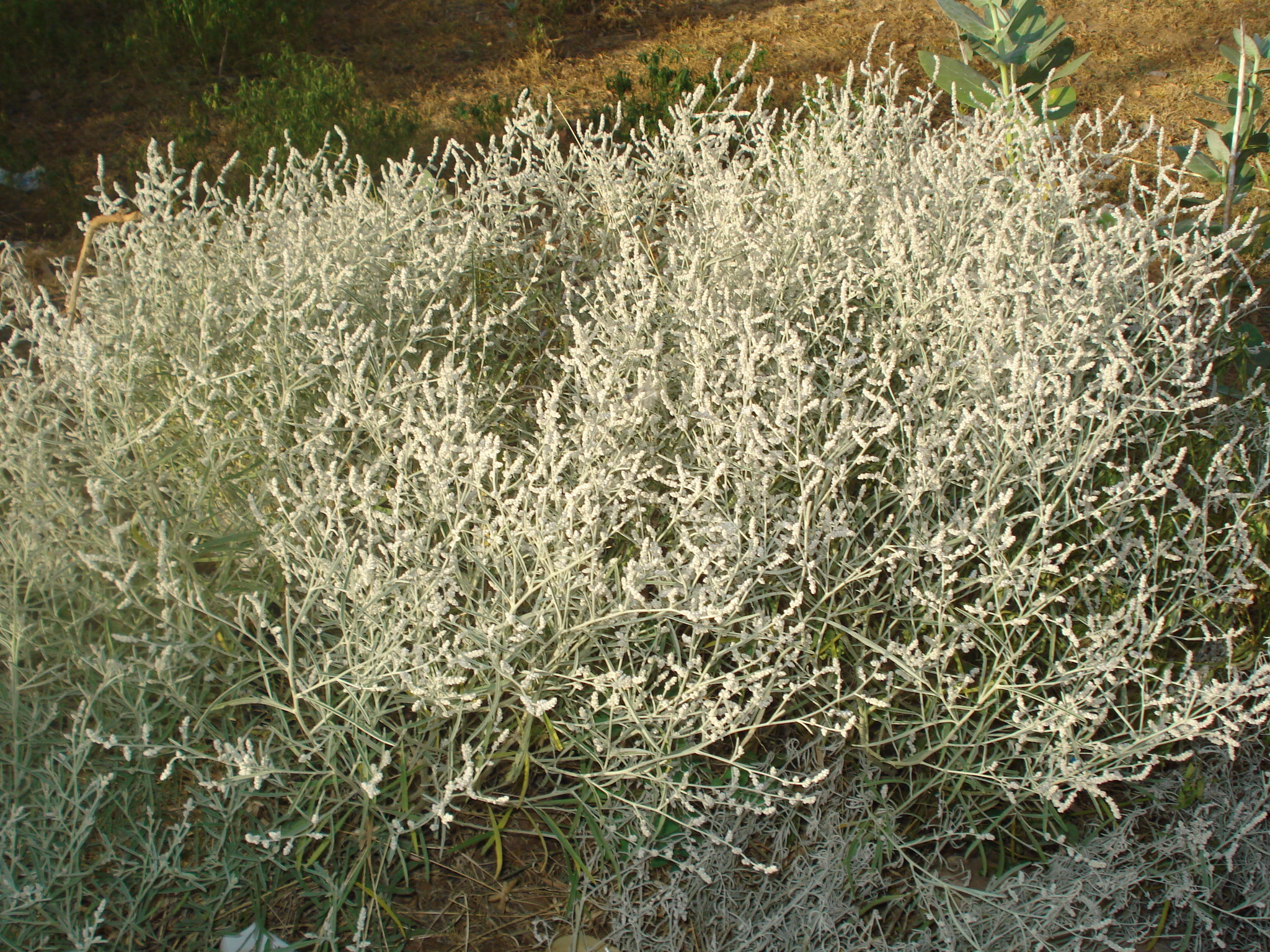
- Aerva javanica

Scientific classification
- Kingdom: Plantae
- Clade: Tracheophytes
- Clade: Angiosperms
- Clade: Eudicots
- Order: Caryophyllales
- Family: Amaranthaceae
- Subfamily: Amaranthoideae
- Genus: Aerva; Forssk.

Synonyms
- Aerua (orth. var.)

= Aerva =

Genus of flowering plants

Aerva is a genus of plants in the family Amaranthaceae. Its species are native to the palaeotropics, throughout continental Africa, Madagascar and smaller islands (Mauritius and Socotra), through parts of the Middle East, India, and southeast Asia. Aerva javanica is an alien in northern Australia.

At least four species in the genus have acquired the C_{4} carbon fixation pathway.

== Species ==
Six species are accepted.

- Aerva javanica (Burm.f.) Juss. ex Schult. – northern and eastern Africa, Madagascar, Arabian Peninsula and west Asia, Indian subcontinent, and Myanmar
- Aerva madagassica Suess. – Madagascar
- Aerva radicans Mart. – India
- Aerva sericea Moq. – Hawaiian Islands (extinct)
- Aerva villosa Moq. – Mauritius
- Aerva wightii Hook.f. – India

=== Formerly placed here ===
- Nothosaerva brachiata (L.) Wight (as Aerva brachiata (L.) Mart.)
- Ouret congesta (Balf.f. ex Baker) Kuntze (as Aerva congesta Balf.f. ex Baker)
- Ouret lanata (L.) Kuntze (as Aerva lanata (L.) Juss. ex Schult.)
- Paraerva microphylla (as Aerva microphylla Moq.)
- Paraerva revoluta (as Aerva revoluta Balf.f.)
- Wadithamnus artemisioides (Vierh. & O.Schwartz) T.Hammer & R.W.Davis (as Aerva artemisioides Vierh. & O.Schwartz)
