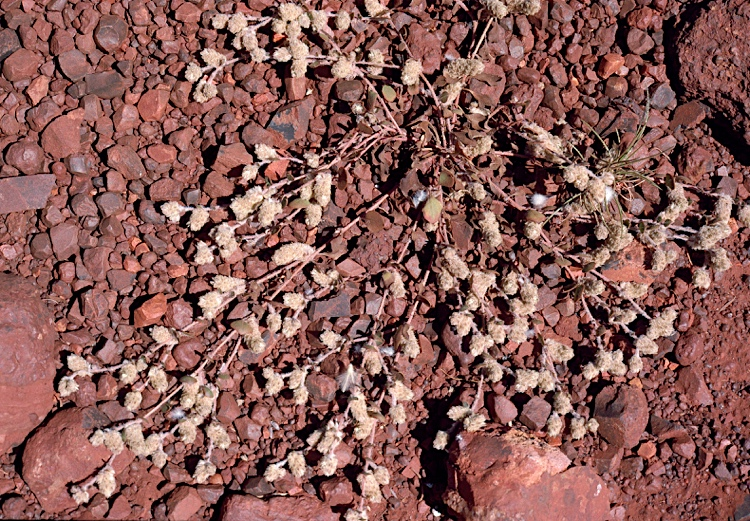
- North of Wittenoom

Scientific classification
- Kingdom: Plantae
- Clade: Tracheophytes
- Clade: Angiosperms
- Clade: Eudicots
- Order: Caryophyllales
- Family: Amaranthaceae
- Genus: Ptilotus
- Species: P. aervoides

Binomial name
- Ptilotus aervoides (F.Muell.)F.Muell.

Synonyms
- Trichinium aervoides F.Muell.

= Ptilotus aervoides =

Species of grass-like plant

Ptilotus aervoides, commonly known as mat mulla mulla, is a species of flowering plant in the family Amaranthaceae and is endemic to western Australia. It is a prostrate, mat-forming annual or short-lived perennial herb, its stems densely hairy at first, egg-shaped to spatula-shaped stem leaves, dense spikes of hairy creamy-green flowers with two or three fertile stamens.

== Description ==
Ptilotus aervoides is a prostrate, mat-forming annual or short-lived perennial herb that typically grows up to 4 cm (1.6 in) high and 70 cm (28 in) wide, with densely hairy young stems that become glabrous as they age. The leaves are egg-shaped to spatula-shaped, 60 mm (2.4 in) long, 20 mm (0.79 in) wide and sometimes reddish. The flowers are hairy, creamy-green, often tinged with pinkish-purple, borne in oval to cylindrical spikes 7–40 mm (0.28–1.57 in) long and 7–14 mm (0.28–0.55 in) wide. There is a bract 3.2–5 mm (0.13–0.20 in) long and two hairy, colourless bracteoles 3.5–4.5 mm (0.14–0.18 in) long at the base of the flowers. Flowering occurs from May to October.

== Taxonomy ==
This species was first formally described in 1862 by Ferdinand von Mueller who gave it the name Trichinium aervoides in his Fragmenta Phytographiae Australiae from specimens collected during the Francis Thomas Gregory expedition of 1861. In a later edition of the same book, von Mueller changed the name to Ptilotus aervoides. The specific epithet (aervoides) means 'Aerva - like'.

== Distribution and habitat ==
Mat mulla mulla is widespread in the north-west of Western Australia, and occurs in the Central Ranges bioregion of South Australia and in the Burt Plain, Finke, Little Sandy Desert, MacDonnell Ranges and Simpson Strzelecki Dunefields bioregions of southern Northern Territory.

== Conservation status ==
This species of Ptilotus is listed as "not threatened" by the Government of Western Australia Department of Biodiversity, Conservation and Attractions, but as "near threatened" under the Northern Territory Territory Parks and Wildlife Conservation Act.

== See also ==
- List of Ptilotus species
