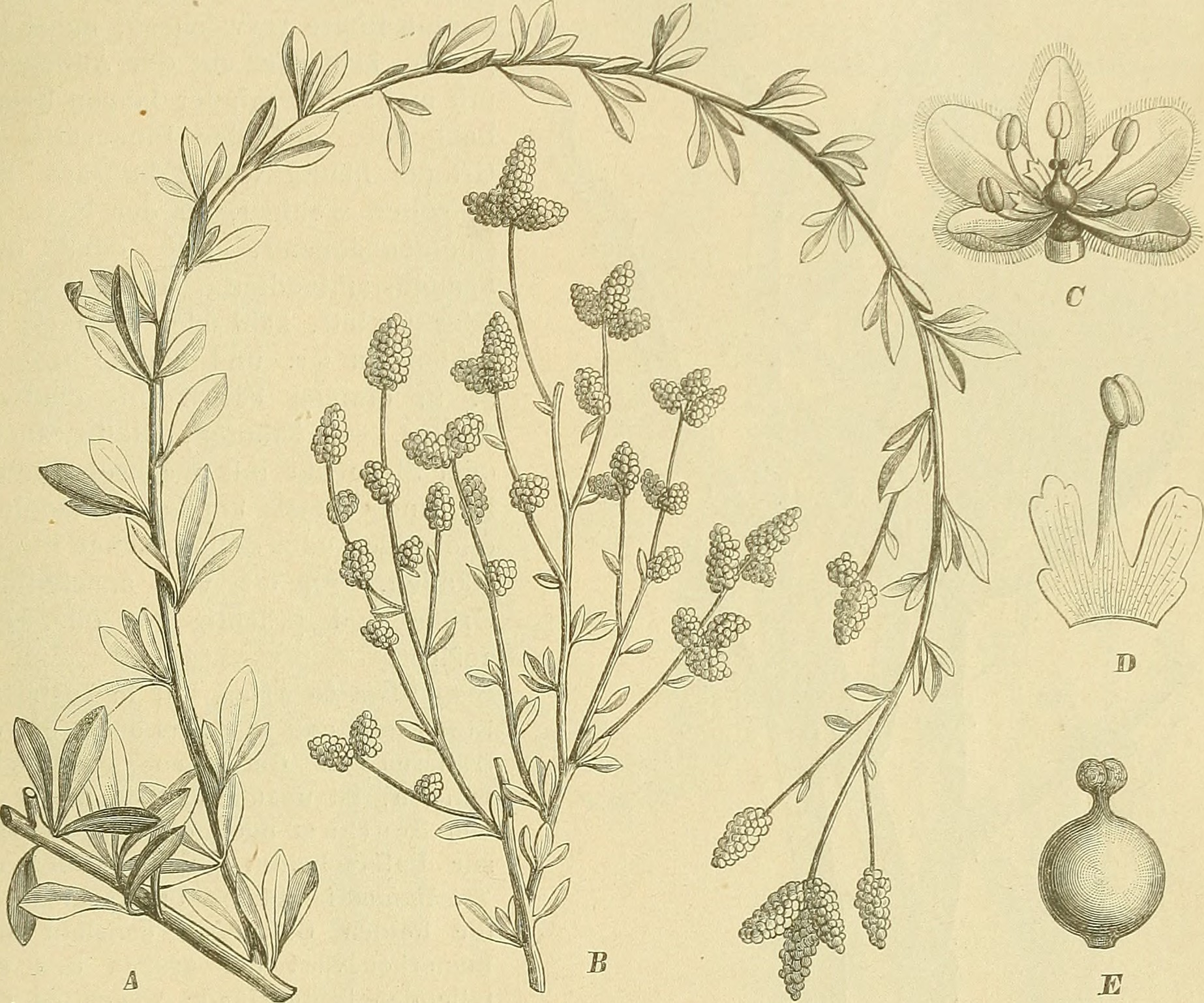
- Line drawing of Paraerva microphylla

Scientific classification
- Kingdom: Plantae
- Clade: Tracheophytes
- Clade: Angiosperms
- Clade: Eudicots
- Order: Caryophyllales
- Family: Amaranthaceae
- Genus: Paraerva; T.Hammer (2019)

Species
- Paraerva microphylla (Moq.) T.Hammer; Paraerva revoluta (Balf.f.) T.Hammer

= Paraerva =

Genus of flowering plants

Paraerva is a genus of flowering plants in family Amaranthaceae. It includes two species which are endemic to the Socotra archipelago.

- Paraerva microphylla (Moq.) T.Hammer
- Paraerva revoluta (Balf.f.) T.Hammer
