= Dasapushpam =

Ten herbs important in Kerala

Dasapushpam ("dasha" meaning ten in Sanskrit and "pushpam" meaning flowers), or the ten sacred flowers of Kerala, are ten herbs traditionally significant to Keralites, the people of Kerala, India. These herbs are found almost everywhere in Kerala, especially in the Western Ghats region. They are used for decorative purposes, such as making the floral carpet pookalam during festivals like Onam. These ten flowers are also used to prepare folk medicines in Kerala.

== List ==
The ten plants are:

Common name	Binomial name	Malayalam name	Image
Slender dwarf morning-glory	Evolvulus alsinoides	കൃഷ്ണക്രാന്തി (Krishnakranthi)	
Indian doab or Bahama grass	Cynodon dactylon	കറുക (Karuka)	
lilac tasselflower	Emilia sonchifolia	മുയൽ ചെവിയൻ (Muyal cheviyan)	
Morning glory	Ipomoea sepiaria	തിരുതാളി (Thiruthaali)	
Mountain knotgrass	Aerva lanata	ചെറുള (cheroola)	
Golden eye-grass	Curculigo orchioides	നിലപ്പന (Nilappana)	
False daisy	Eclipta alba	കയ്യുണ്യം(Kayyunniam)	
Little ironweed	Cyanthillium cinereum	പൂവാംകുരുന്നില (Poovaamkurunnila)	
Biophytum sensitivum	Biophytum sensitivum	മുക്കുറ്റി (Mukkutti)	
Balloon plant	Cardiospermum halicacabum	ഉഴിഞ്ഞ (Uzhinja)	

Although the Malayalam names refer to the flowers, the medicinal value lies in the leaves in most cases.

== Ipomoea sepiaria ==
Extracts of Ipomoea sepiaria leaves feature antimicrobial activity. The extract was tested on bacteria including Staphylococcus aureus, Klebsiella pneumoniae, Escherichia coli and Pseudomonas aeruginosa.
