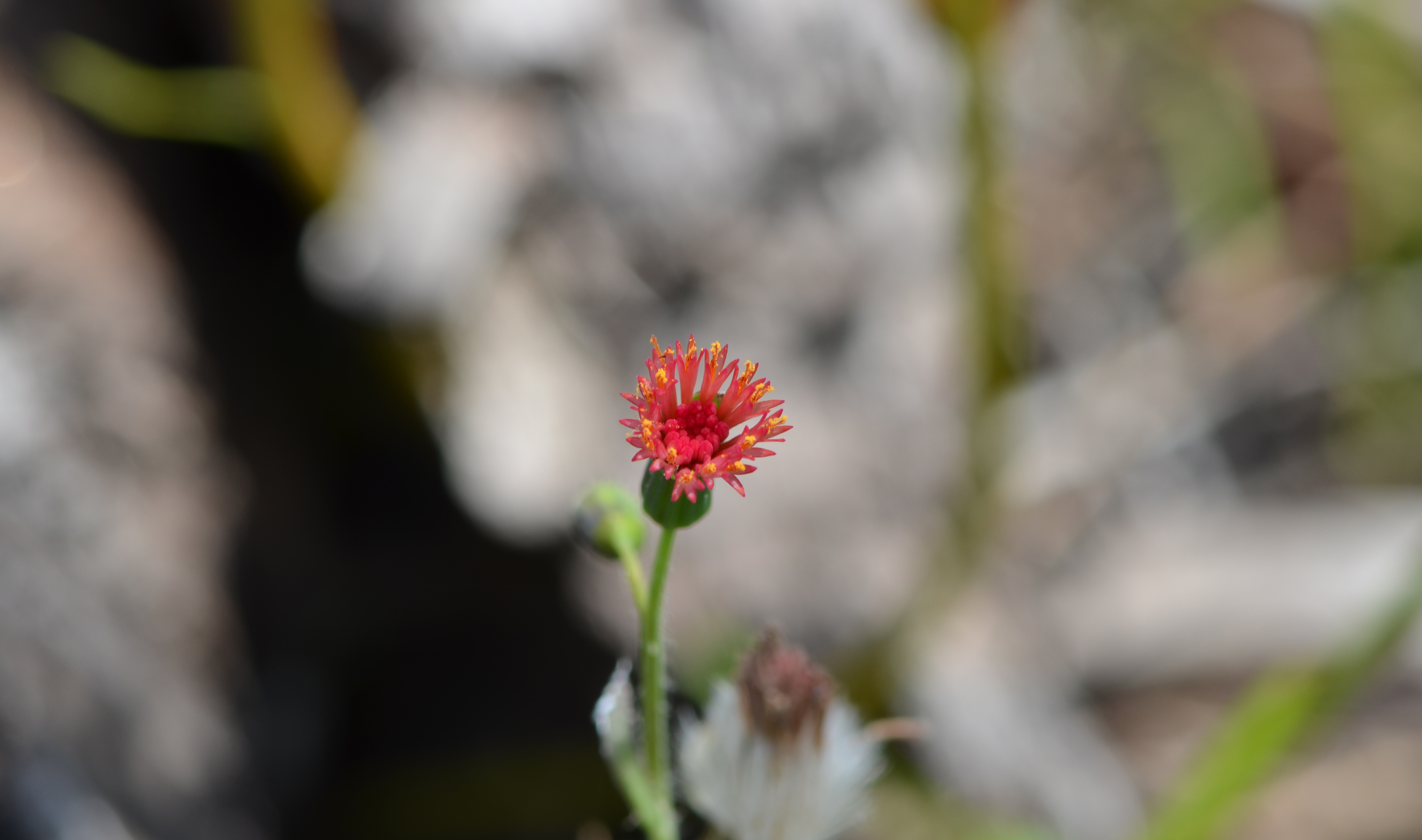
- Above in Florida, below in Hawai'i
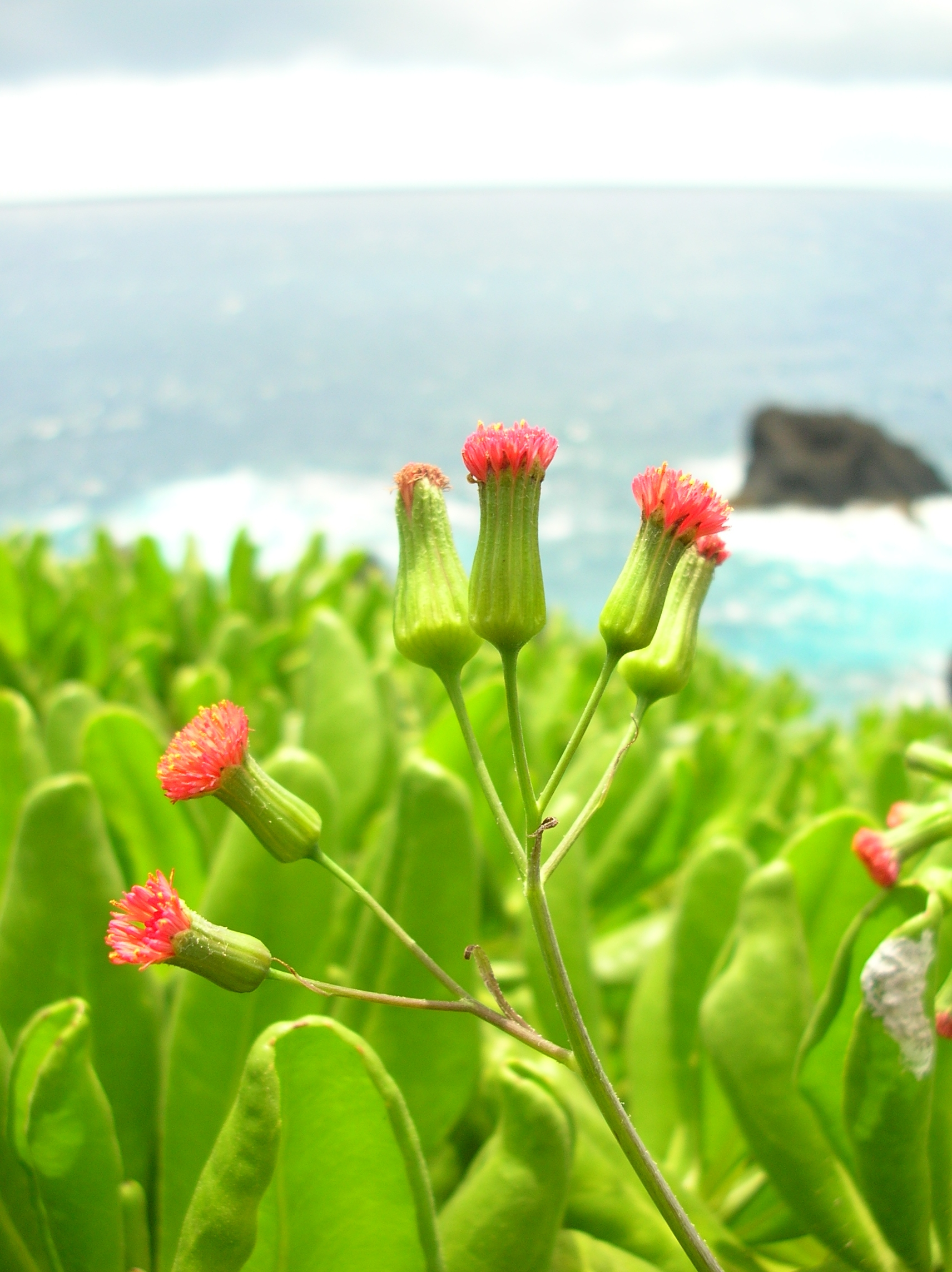

Scientific classification
- Kingdom: Plantae
- Clade: Tracheophytes
- Clade: Angiosperms
- Clade: Eudicots
- Clade: Asterids
- Order: Asterales
- Family: Asteraceae
- Genus: Emilia
- Species: E. fosbergii

Binomial name
- Emilia fosbergii Nicolson

= Emilia fosbergii =

Species of flowering plant

Emilia fosbergii is a species of plant in the sunflower family. It is commonly known in the United States as Florida tasselflower.

== Taxonomy ==
Emilia fosbergii has been collected in many places for many years, the specimens regarded as belonging to E. coccinea, E. sagittata, or E. javanica. A reexamination of a large number of specimens led Nicolson to recognize it as a distinct species in 1975. He named the species in honor of Francis Raymond Fosberg.

== Distribution ==
Emilia fosbergii is widely distributed in tropical and semitropical parts of the world: Africa, South and Southeast Asia, northern Australia, North and South America, and various oceanic islands. Its region of origin is the subject of some dispute; some say it is native to Africa, while others say Asia or South America. It is reportedly naturalized in scattered locations in the United States, including Puerto Rico, and the Virgin Islands.

== Description ==
Emilia fosbergii is an annual herb, growing up to 100 cm (40 inches) tall. It generally has only one central stem, sometimes branching but other times not. Each flower head can contain more than 60 pink, purple, or red disc florets, however, no ray florets are present. It produces seeds with hairs intended for wind dispersal.

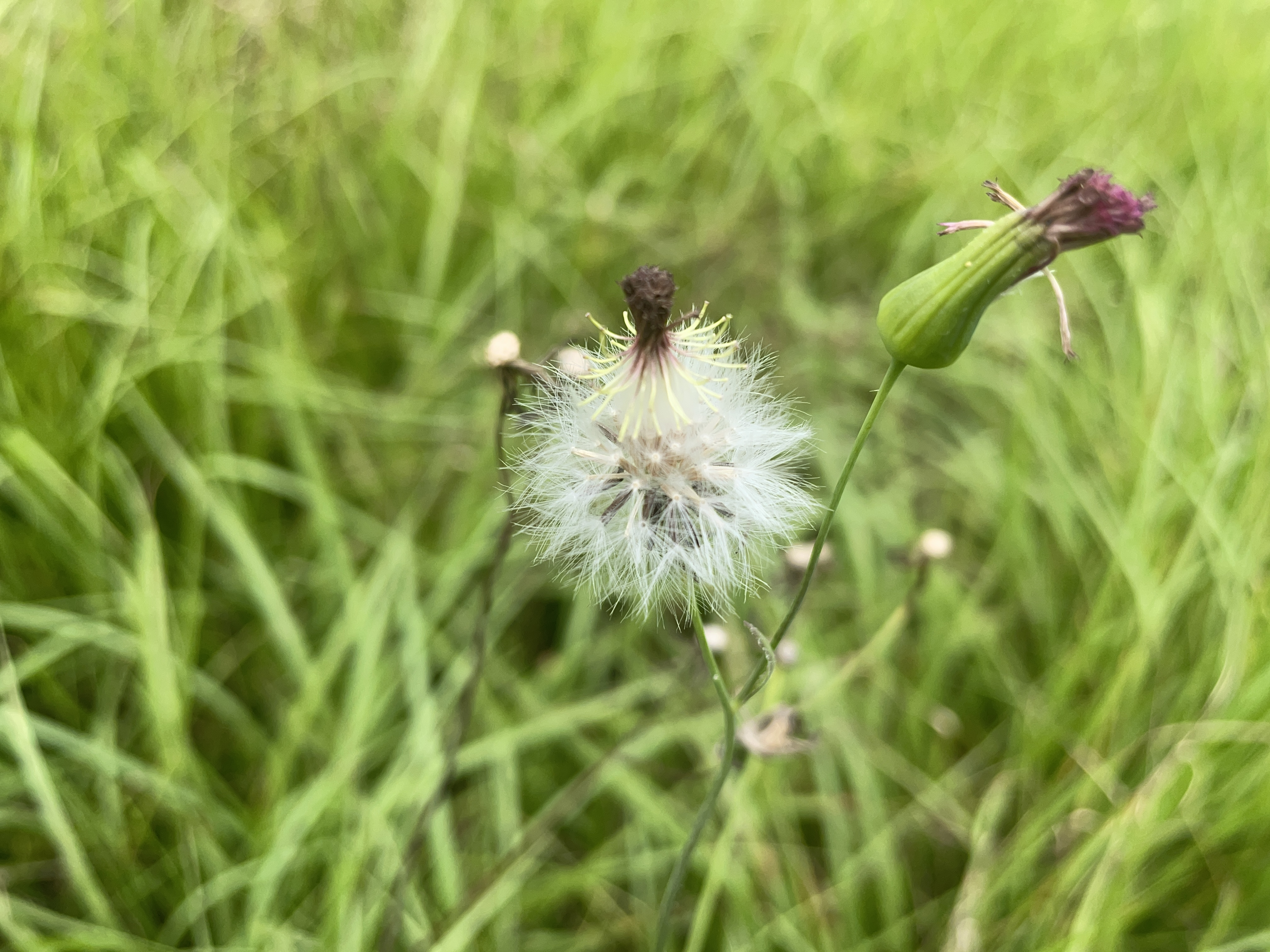
E. fosbergii seed head
