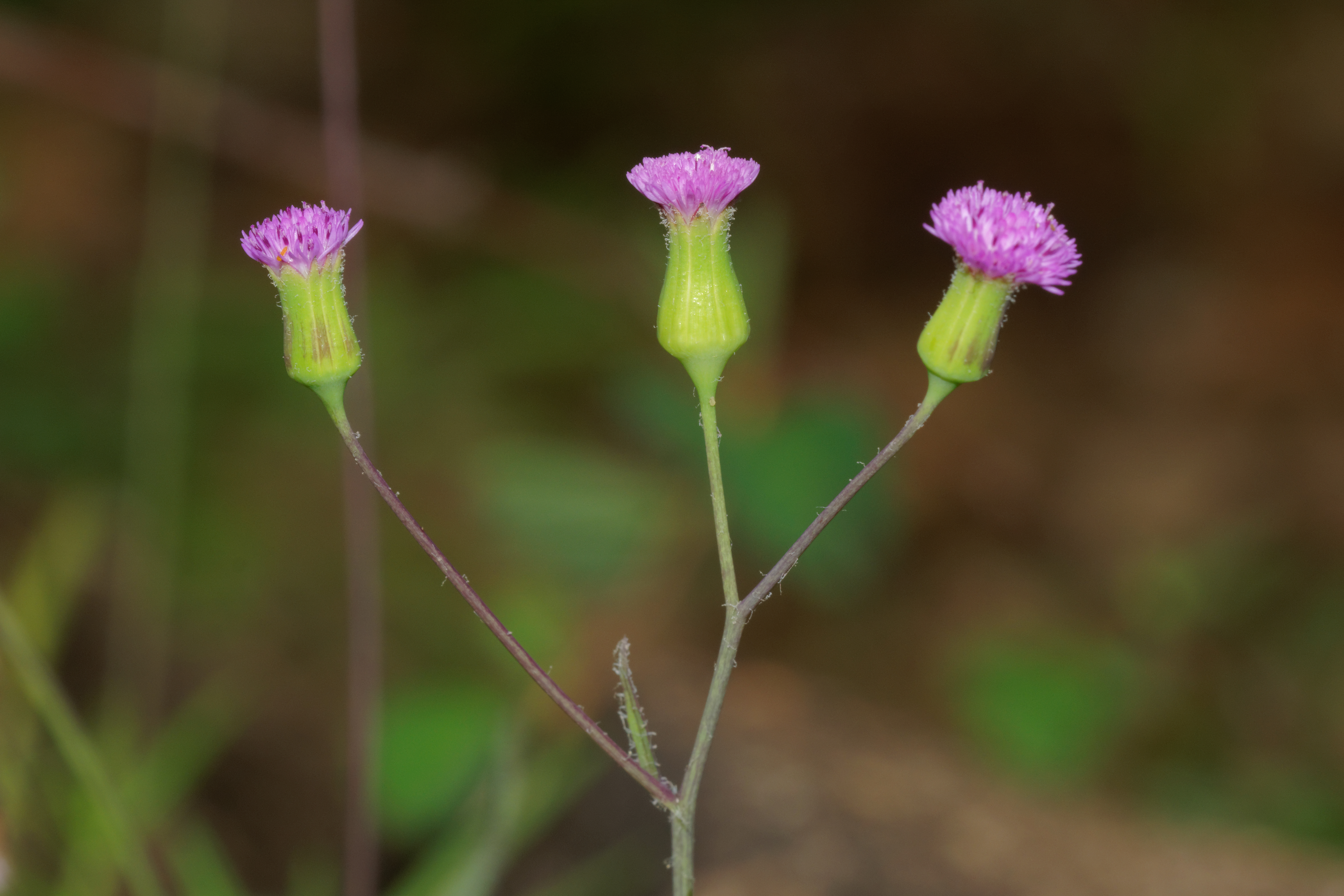

Scientific classification
- Kingdom: Plantae
- Clade: Embryophytes
- Clade: Tracheophytes
- Clade: Spermatophytes
- Clade: Angiosperms
- Clade: Eudicots
- Clade: Asterids
- Order: Asterales
- Family: Asteraceae
- Genus: Emilia
- Species: E. sonchifolia

Binomial name
- Emilia sonchifolia (L.) DC. ex Wight

Synonyms
- List: Cacalia sonchifolia Hort ex L.; Crassocephalum sonchifolium (L.) Less.; Emilia marivelensis Elmer; Emilia purpurea Cass.; Emilia rigidula DC.; Emilia sinica Miq.; Gynura ecalyculata DC.; Prenanthes javanica (Burm.f.) Willd.; Senecio auriculatus Burm.f.; Senecio rapae F.Br.; Senecio sonchifolius (L.) Moench; Sonchus javanicus (Burm.f.) Spreng.

= Emilia sonchifolia =

Species of plant

Emilia sonchifolia, also known as lilac tasselflower or cupid's shaving brush, is a tropical flowering species of tasselflower in the sunflower family. It is a branching, annual herb up to 40 cm (15 1/2 in) tall. The leaves are lyrate-pinnatilobed, up to 10 cm (4 in) long, sometimes becoming purplish as they get old. One plant can produce several pink or purplish flower heads.

It is widespread in tropical regions around the world. Though hepatotoxic, the leaves and young shoots can be eaten as vegetables.

== Description ==
Emilia sonchifolia is erect and sparingly hairy, soft-stemmed, and grows to 20 to 70 cm high with a branch tap root. The leaf pattern is alternate with winged petioles. Leaves on the lower end of the stem are round/oval shape, 4 to 16 cm in height, and 1 to 8 cm in width. The leaves on the upper end of the stem are smaller than the leaves on the lower end of the stem and are often coarsely toothed.

The inflorescence is often dichotomous, with 3 to 6 stalked flower heads and whorled bracts below. The urn-shaped flower head has 30-60 florets per head, the outer ray florets are female, and the inner disc florets are bisexual. The flower is any of a range of colors: purple, scarlet, red, pink, orange, white, or lilac. The fruit produced is oval shaped, reddish brown or off-white, has white hairs up to 8 mm long, and exhibits dry indehiscent properties.

The plant completes its life cycle in approximately 90 days. There are two types of seed, which are defined by the color of the achene. The first, a female outer circle of florets of a flower head produces red and brown achenes. The second is the inner, off-white hermaphrodite florets. Most seeds germinate at 27 °C but those that develop from outer florets germinate under deep shade. Plants only emerge from seeds near the surface, however, some seed can germinate (4%) while buried deep (4 cm). The seed carries a pappus of hairs, indicating the use of wind as a dispersal agent.

== Distribution and habitat ==
Emilia sonchifolia is widespread in tropical regions around the world, apparently native to Asia (China, India, Southeast Asia, etc.) and naturalized in Africa, Australia, the Americas, and various oceanic islands.

It can grow anywhere from sea level to 1,000 metres (3,300 ft). It exists over a wide range of conditions from the tropics to grasslands, waste areas, roadsides, and partially shaded areas. It is tolerant of acid conditions.

== Ecology ==
Emilia sonchifolia is commonly reported as a weed crop. In most areas, it is reported as noninvasive, however, in some cotton producing areas, it is classified as the most problematic weeds.

It has certain effects on individual crops, such as decreases in weight of lettuce (by 70%) and mustard cabbage (by 30%), and a decreased yield of tomato fruit by 18%.

The pathogens associated with E. sonchifolia also have effects on certain crops. Emilia sonchifolia is a host of Xanthomonas campestris, which causes a bacterial infection in beans in Brazil and Cuba.

=== Management ===
Emilia sonchifolia is classified as a weed that grows in the fields of many agriculture crops, but it can be controlled via the use of certain chemicals. For example, in rice, a mixture of pretilachlor and dimethametryn, and a mixture of piperophos with propanil or oxadiazon, are added to the soil after sowing, resulting in 8–12 weeks of growth control against E. sonchifolia. In soybean fields, a mixture of bentazone, fomesafen and sethoxydim is used to control E. sonchifolia growth. In cotton and soybean fields, sethoxydim is the chemical agent used to control E. sonchifolia growth. Lastly, atrazine is the chemical agent used to control the growth of E. sonchifolia in sugarcane crops.

== Toxicity ==
Emilia sonchifolia contains tumorigenic pyrrolizidine alkaloids, causing hepatotoxicity.

== Uses ==
The leaves and young shoots can be eaten as vegetables, raw or cooked. For this the leaves are harvested mainly before the plant flowers.

The young leaves are used as food in Java and Puerto Rico.

Emilia sonchifolia in Chinese is called ye xia hong (Chinese: 葉下紅) and in traditional Chinese medicine (TCM) is considered usable as a medicinal herb.

In India it is one of the "Ten Sacred Flowers of Kerala" (which are collectively known as Dasapushpam).

In Vietnam Emilia sonchifolia has been used in traditional medicine for the treatment of fever, sore throat, diarrhea, eczema and as an antidote for snake bites.

== Gallery ==
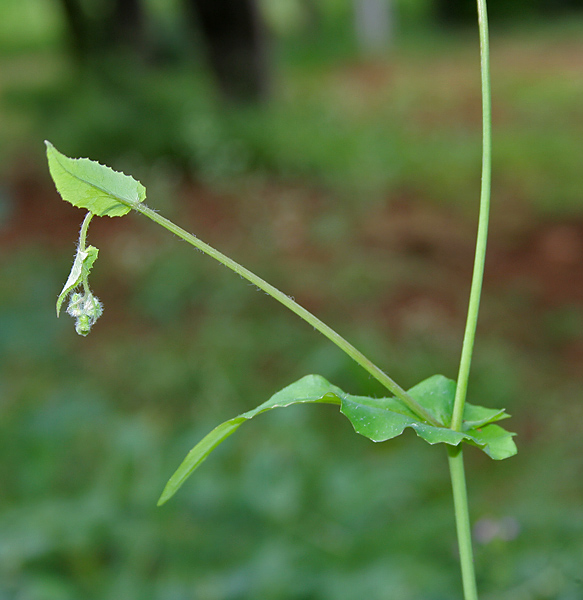
in Hyderabad, India.

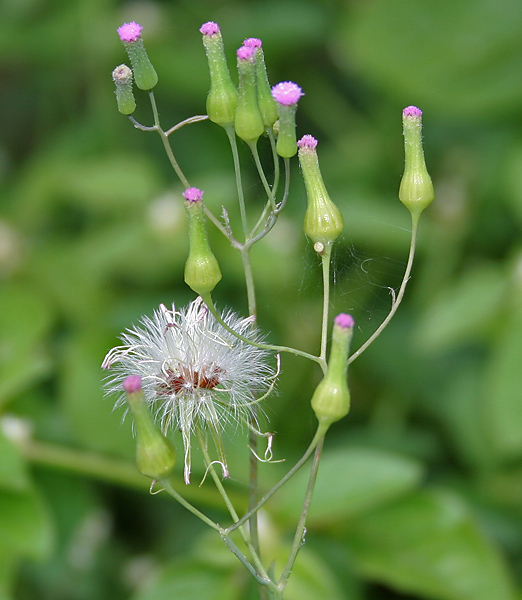
Flower and seed head in Hyderabad, India.

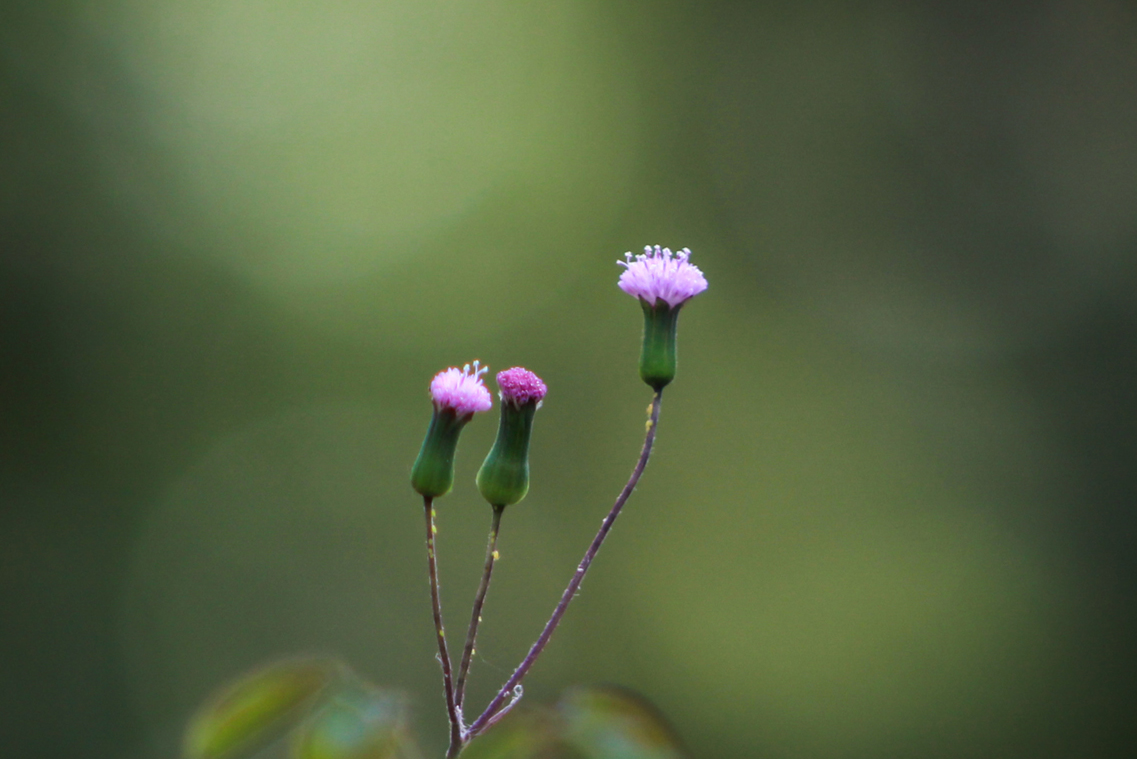
Emilia sonchifolia in South East Asia

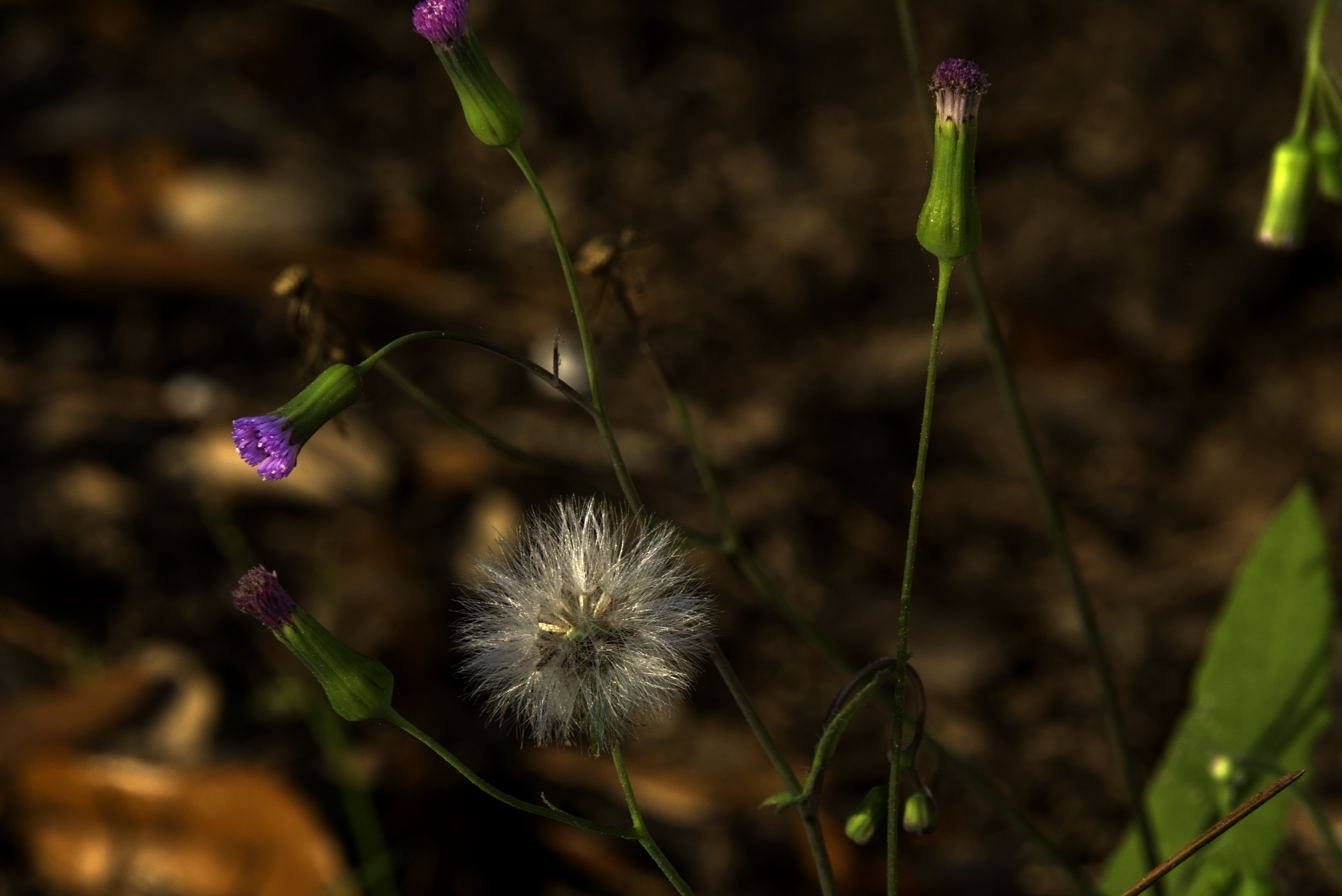
Emilia sonchifolia flower and seed head in South Florida
