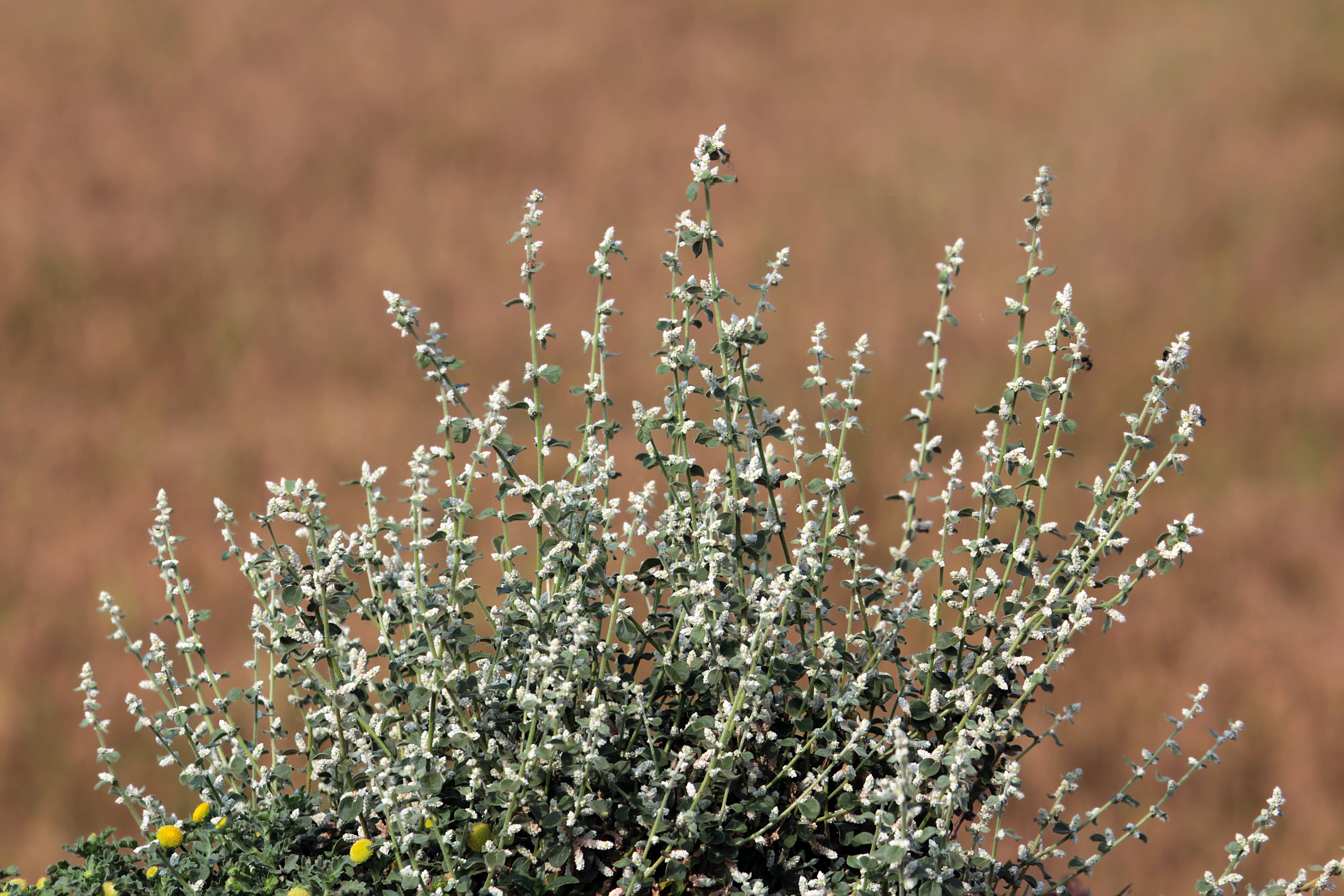
- Ouret lanata here called Aerva lanata

Scientific classification
- Kingdom: Plantae
- Clade: Tracheophytes
- Clade: Angiosperms
- Clade: Eudicots
- Order: Caryophyllales
- Family: Amaranthaceae
- Subfamily: Amaranthoideae
- Genus: Ouret; Adans.

Species
- See text

Synonyms
- Uretia Raf.

= Ouret =

Genus of plants in the amaranth family

Ouret is a genus of flowering plants in the amaranth family Amaranthaceae, found in Africa, Madagascar, many of the Indian Ocean islands, the Arabian Peninsula, the Indian Subcontinent, Sri Lanka, Southeast Asia, Indonesia, New Guinea, China (including Hainan and Taiwan), and the Philippines.

== Species ==
Currently accepted species include:

- Ouret congesta (Balf.f. ex Baker) Kuntze
- Ouret coriacea (Schinz) T.Hammer
- Ouret glabrata (Hook.f.) Kuntze
- Ouret humbertii (Cavaco) T.Hammer
- Ouret lanata (L.) Kuntze
- Ouret leucura (Moq.) Kuntze
- Ouret sanguinolenta (L.) Kuntze
- Ouret triangularifolia (Cavaco) T.Hammer
