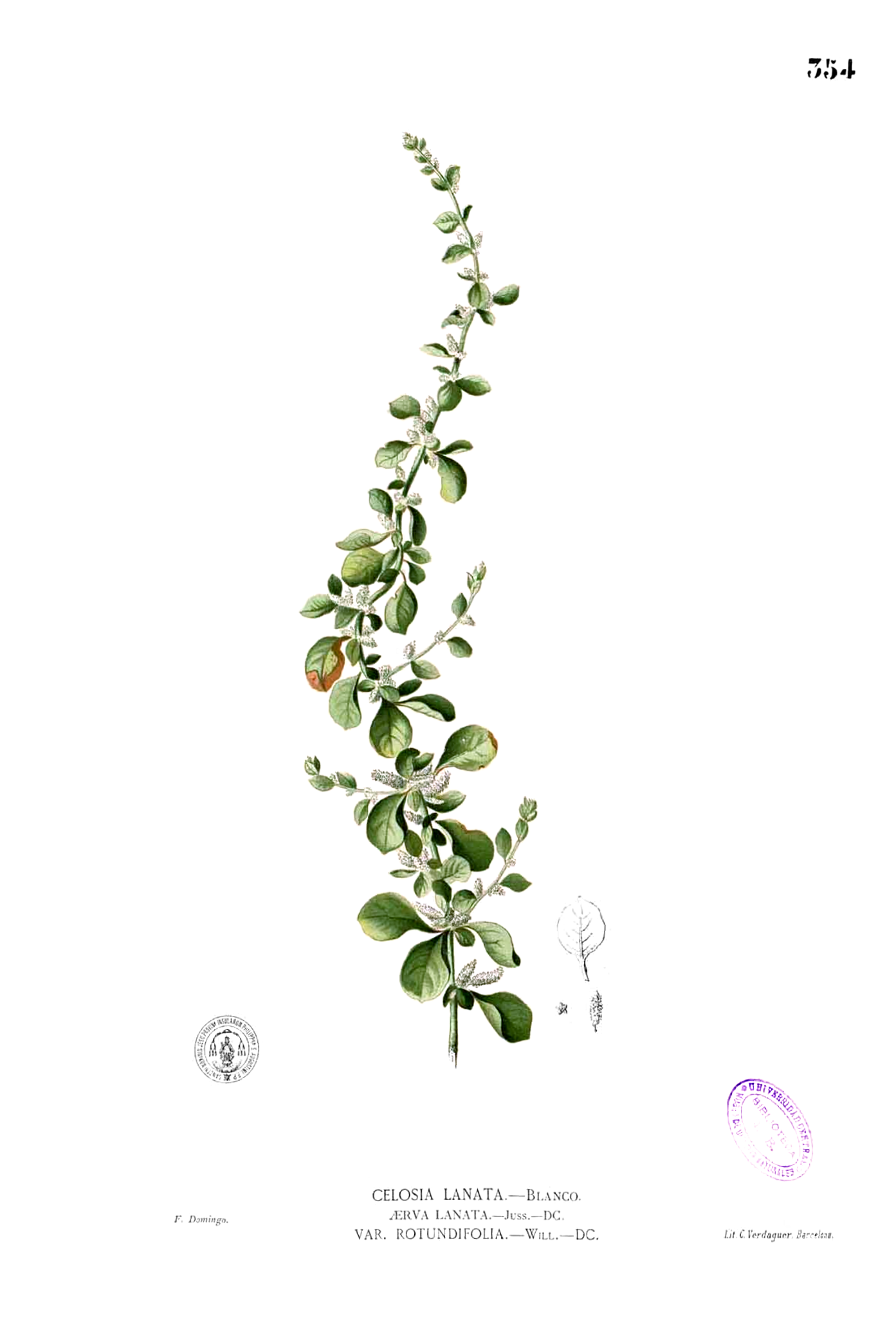

Scientific classification
- Kingdom: Plantae
- Clade: Tracheophytes
- Clade: Angiosperms
- Clade: Eudicots
- Order: Caryophyllales
- Family: Amaranthaceae
- Genus: Ouret
- Species: O. lanata

Binomial name
- Ouret lanata (L.) Kuntze

Synonyms
- Synonymy: Achyranthes lanata L.; Achyranthes lanata Roxb.; Achyranthes pubescens (Willd.) Roth; Achyranthes villosa Forssk.; Aerva arachnoidea Gand.; Aerva elegans Moq.; Aerva floribunda Wight; Aerva lanata (L.) Juss. ex Schult.; Aerva lanata var. citrina Suess.; Aerva lanata var. elegans Suess.; Aerva lanata var. floribunda Moq.; Aerva lanata f. grandifolia Suess.; Aerva lanata var. leucuroides Suess.; Aerva lanata f. microphylla Suess.; Aerva lanata var. microstachys Moq.; Aerva lanata var. orbicularis Suess.; Aerva lanata var. pseudojavanica Suess.; Aerva lanata var. rhombea Suess.; Aerva lanata var. robusta Balf.f.; Aerva lanata var. rotundifolia Moq.; Aerva lanata f. squarrosa Suess.; Aerva lanata var. steudneri Asch.; Aerva lanata var. suborbicularis Suess.; Aerva lanata var. viridis Moq.; Aerva mozambicensis Gand.; Aerva pubescens Mart.; Aerva sansibarica Suess.; Aerva tandalo Buch.-Ham. ex Dill.; Aerva viridis E.Mey. ex Moq.; Alternanthera pubescens Moq.; Amaranthus aeruoides Hochst. & Steud. ex A.Rich.; Amaranthus lanatus Dum.Cours.; Illecebrum lanatum (L.) L.; Illecebrum pubescens Willd.; Ouret persica var. pubescens (Mart.) Kuntze; Paronychia lanata (L.) Moench

= Ouret lanata =

Species of plant

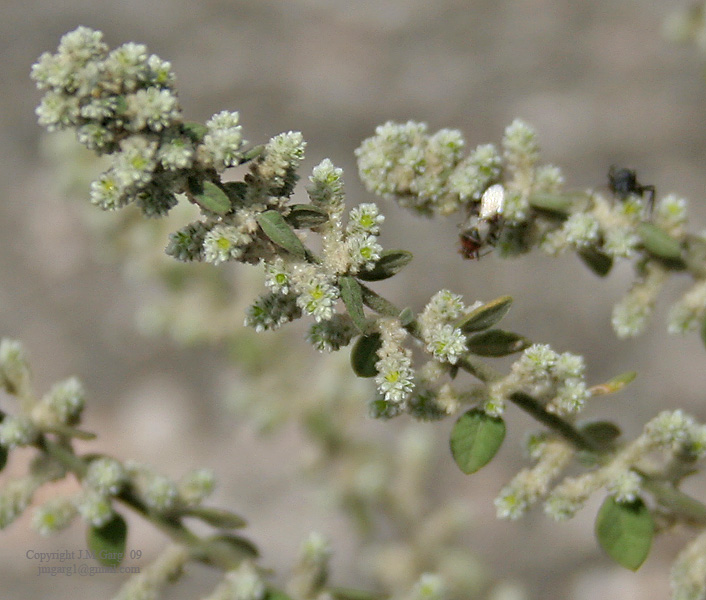
in Bhuvanagiri, Andhra Pradesh

Ouret lanata (synonym Aerva lanata), the mountain knotgrass, is a woody, prostrate or succulent, perennial herb in the family Amaranthaceae, native to the tropics of Africa and Asia. It has been included as occurring in Australia by the US government, but it is not recognised as occurring in Australia by any Australian state herbarium or Plants of the World Online. The plant sometimes flowers in the first year.

Ouret lanata is a common weed which grows wild everywhere in the plains of India. The root has a camphor-like aroma. The dried flowers which look like soft spikes, are sold under the commercial names Buikallan and Boor. It is one of the plants included in Dasapushpam, the ten sacred flowers of Kerala. Ouret lanata is known as 'konda pindi aaku' (కొండ పిండి ఆకు) in Telugu because of the 'powdery' appearance of its leaves, but several regional names exist.

== Description ==
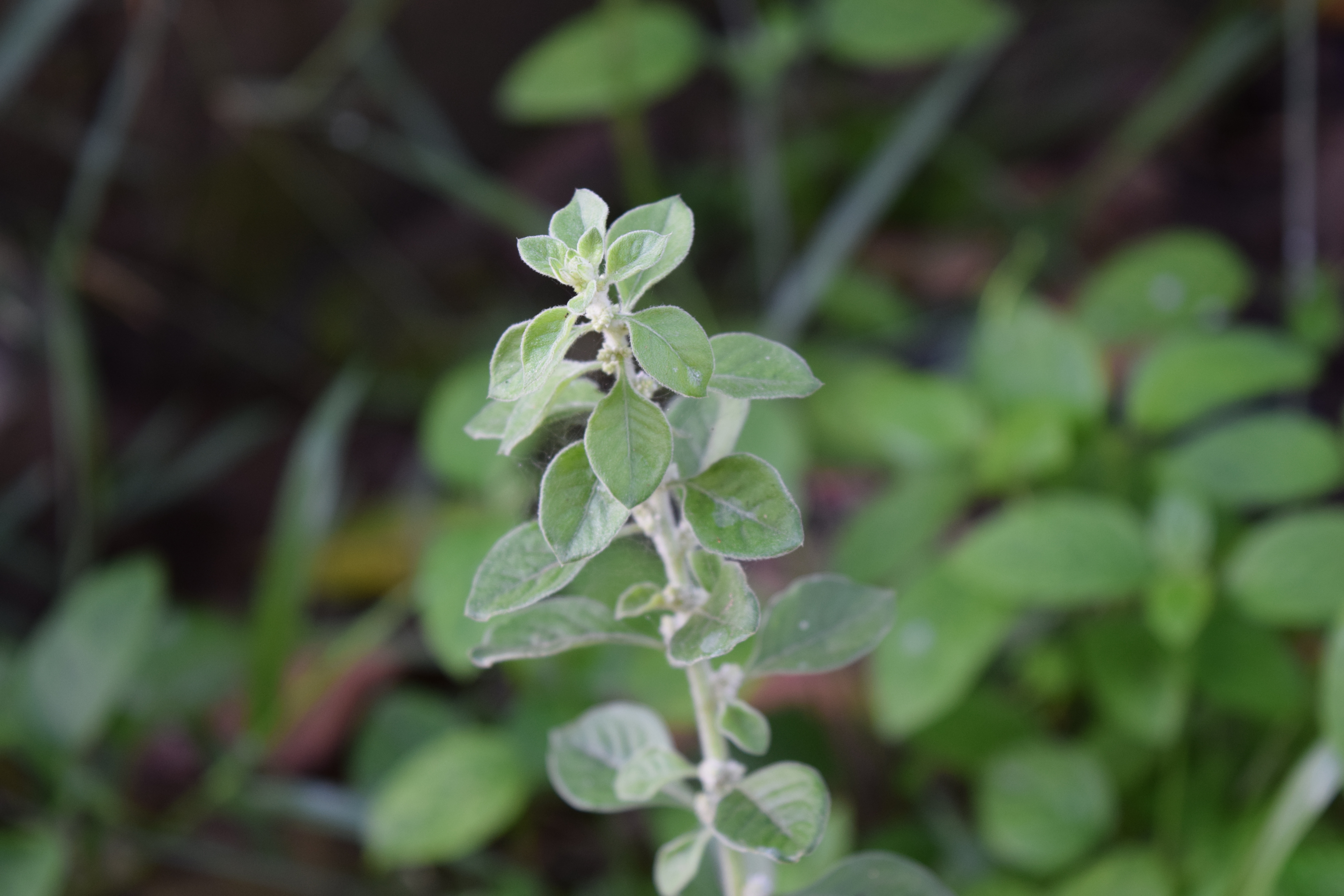
Ouret lanata From Kerala.

Mountain knotgrass is an annual with a branching, somewhat woody root system. The stems are mostly straggling and sprawling and spread widely, sometimes as much as 6 feet (1.8 m) in length. The often stalkless leaves are alternate, oval and 0.5 to 1.5 in (13 to 38 mm) long. They grow from whitish papery stipules with two lobes and red bases. The tiny clusters of two or three flowers grow in the leaf axils. The flowers are about 0.1 in (2.5 mm) long, pink, green or dull white. The flowers are normally self-pollinated. Flowering time is from May to October.

== Distribution and habitat ==
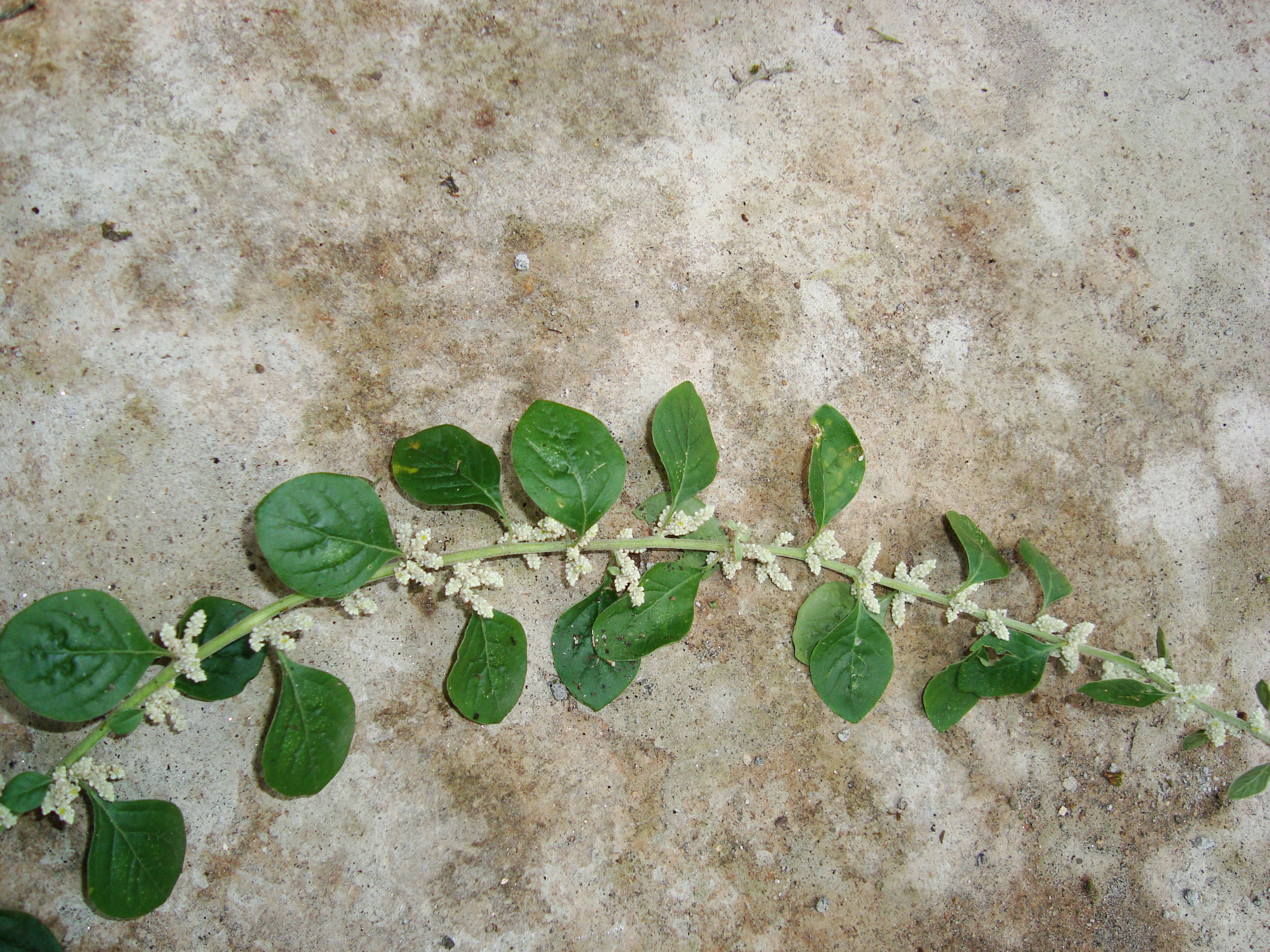
in Thrissur, Kerala

Ouret lanata is native to tropical Africa, Madagascar, Egypt, Saudi Arabia and Yemen, the Indian subcontinent, Vietnam, Peninsular Malaysia, Sumatra, Java, the Philippines, and New Guinea. The species prefers damper sites than Aerva javanica and can be found in open forests on mountain slopes, on waste and disturbed ground, deserted cultivation and coastal scrub and at elevations from sea level to 900 m (3,000 ft). It is a common weed in arable fields and bare patches of ground.

== Uses ==
This plant is used for food for people and animals. The whole plant, especially the leaves, is edible. The leaves are put into soup or eaten as a spinach or as a vegetable. The plant provides grazing for stock, game and chickens. The plant is used as a traditional medicine for snakebites..

In folk-medicine in Andhra Pradesh and Telangana, The leaves of Ouret Lanata are crushed to paste with Jaggery, heated in Castor oil, and applied to wounds caused by thorns while still warm; this preparation reportedly provides pain-relief, aids healing, and aids in thorn removal if the thorn is still embedded in the skin. While Castor Oil and medical-grade Sugar have been previously investigated for wound treatment, the wound healing effects of Ouret Lanata haven't been extensively studied.

Traditionally, a snippet of the plant is placed in the centre of crude balls made of cow dung called "Gobbemmalu" (Telugu: గొబ్బెమ్మలు) made during Sankranti.

The plant is also used as a talisman against evil spirits, a good-luck talisman for hunters, and a talisman for the well-being of widows.

In the traditional medicine of India, the juice of crushed Ouret lanata root is used for jaundice therapy.
