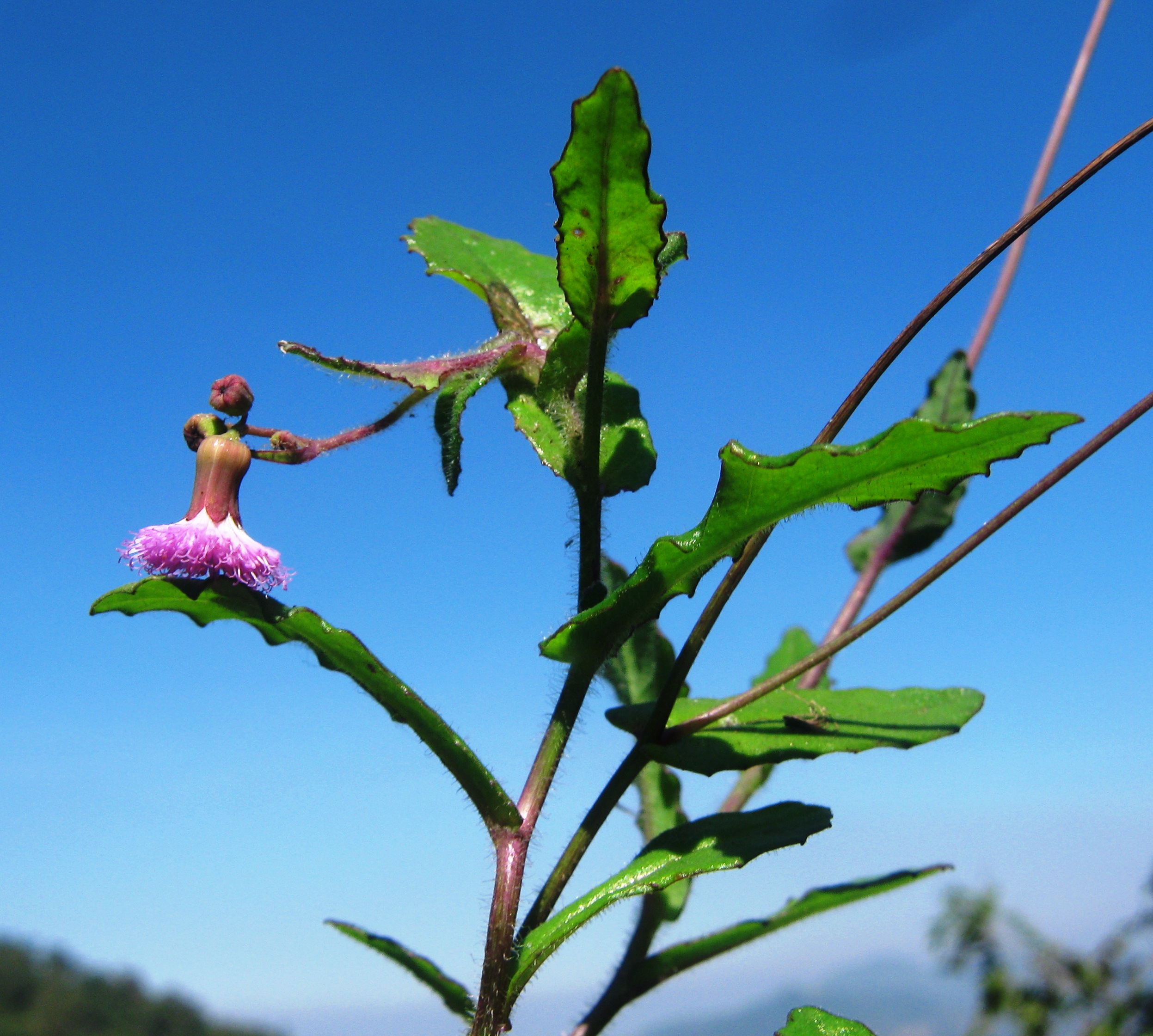

Scientific classification
- Kingdom: Plantae
- Clade: Tracheophytes
- Clade: Angiosperms
- Clade: Eudicots
- Clade: Asterids
- Order: Asterales
- Family: Asteraceae
- Genus: Emilia
- Species: E. reddyi

Binomial name
- Emilia reddyi Satish & J.Prak.Rao

= Emilia reddyi =

Species of flowering plant

Emilia reddyi is a herbaceous plant species belonging to the family of Asteraceae found from Eastern Ghats, India.

Emilia reddyi is named in honor of NRSC scientist Dr. C. Sudhakar Reddy for his significant contribution to the field of plant taxonomy and biodiversity conservation in the country.

== Conservation status ==
Critically Endangered (CR B1 a+ B2 a).
