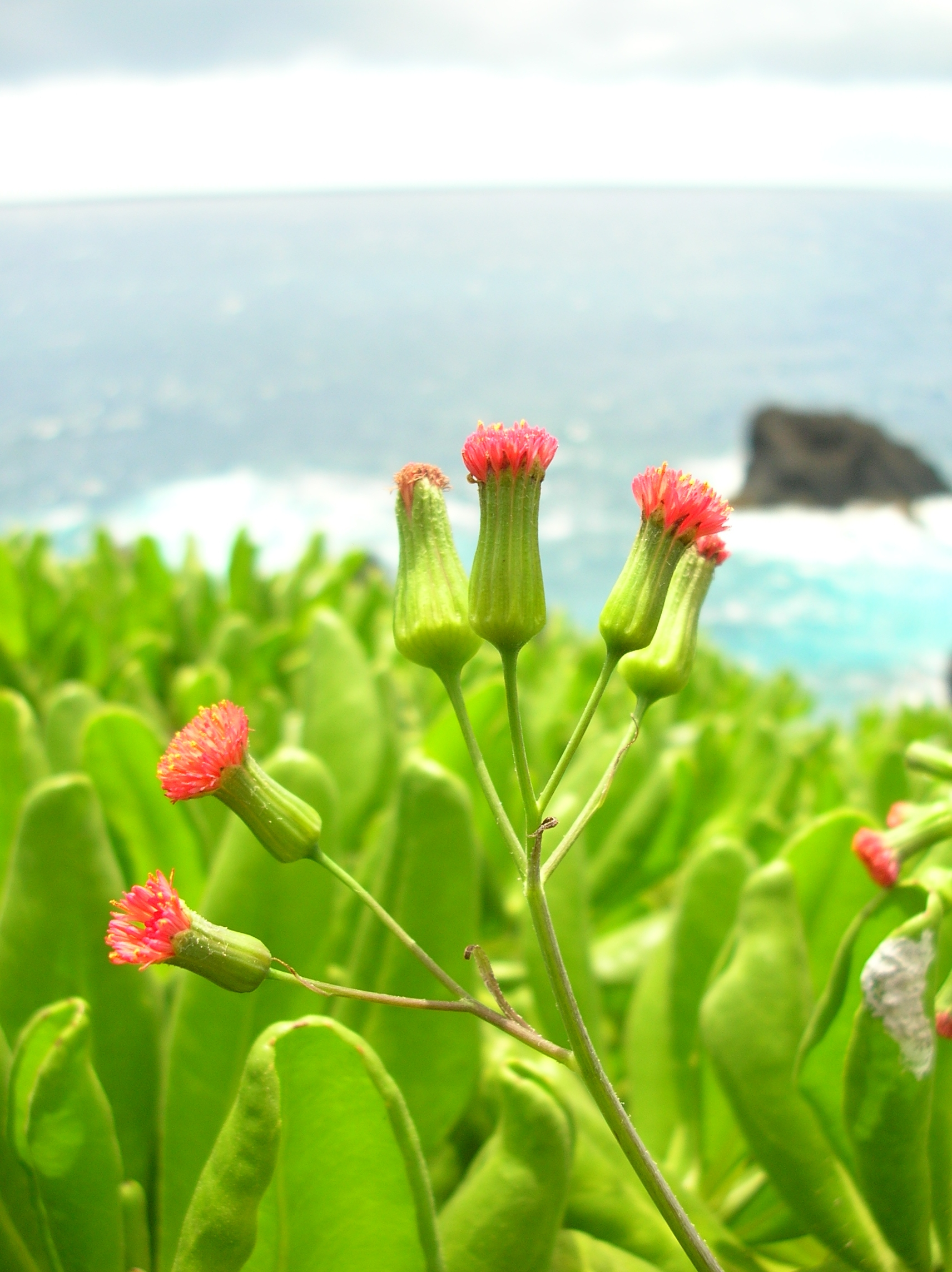
- Emilia fosbergii

Scientific classification
- Kingdom: Plantae
- Clade: Embryophytes
- Clade: Tracheophytes
- Clade: Spermatophytes
- Clade: Angiosperms
- Clade: Eudicots
- Clade: Asterids
- Order: Asterales
- Family: Asteraceae
- Subfamily: Asteroideae
- Tribe: Senecioneae
- Genus: Emilia; Cass.

Synonyms
- Pithosillum Cass.; Senecio sect. Emilioidei Muschl.; Xyridopsis Welw. ex B.Nord.; Pseudactis S.Moore; Senecio subg. Emilia (Cass.) O.Hoffm.

= Emilia (plant) =

Genus of flowering plants

Emilia is a genus of herbaceous plants in the sunflower family, known as tasselflower or pualele.

The members of the genus are distributed mainly in the tropics and sub-tropics of Africa and Asia. Some species have also been placed in the genus Cacalia.

Species accepted by the Plants of the World Online as of 2022:

- Emilia abyssinica (Sch.Bip. ex A.Rich.) C.Jeffrey
- Emilia adamagibaensis Mesfin & Beentje
- Emilia adscendens DC.
- Emilia alstonii Fosberg
- Emilia arvensis Mesfin & Beentje
- Emilia aurita C.Jeffrey
- Emilia baberka (Hutch.) C.Jeffrey
- Emilia baldwinii Fosberg
- Emilia bampsiana Lisowski
- Emilia basifolia Baker
- Emilia bathiei Humbert
- Emilia baumii S.Moore
- Emilia bellioides (Chiov.) C.Jeffrey
- Emilia bianoensis Lisowski
- Emilia biensis (Torre) Mapaya & Cron
- Emilia blittersdorffii Beentje
- Emilia brachycephala (R.E.Fr.) C.Jeffrey
- Emilia capillaris Humbert
- Emilia cenioides C.Jeffrey
- Emilia charlesii Kottaim.
- Emilia chiovendeana (Muschl.) Lisowski
- Emilia citrina DC.
- Emilia coccinea (Sims) G.Don
- Emilia coloniaria (S.Moore) C.Jeffrey
- Emilia crepidioides Garab.
- Emilia crispata C.Jeffrey
- Emilia cryptantha C.Jeffrey
- Emilia debilis S.Moore
- Emilia decaryi Humbert
- Emilia decipiens C.Jeffrey
- Emilia discifolia (Oliv.) C.Jeffrey
- Emilia djalonensis Lisowski
- Emilia drummondii (Torre) Mapaya & Cron
- Emilia duvigneaudii Lisowski
- Emilia emilioides (Sch.Bip.) C.Jeffrey
- Emilia epapposa (Lisowski) Mapaya & Cron
- Emilia everettii (Hemsl.) Steenis
- Emilia exigua (S.Moore) Mapaya & Cron
- Emilia exserta Fosberg
- Emilia fallax (Mattf.) C.Jeffrey
- Emilia flaccida Miq.
- Emilia fosbergii Nicolson
- Emilia fugax C.Jeffrey
- Emilia gaudichaudii Gagnep.
- Emilia gossweileri (S.Moore) C.Jeffrey
- Emilia graminea DC.
- Emilia helianthella C.Jeffrey
- Emilia herbacea Mesfin & Beentje
- Emilia hiernii C.Jeffrey
- Emilia hockii (De Wild. & Muschl.) C.Jeffrey
- Emilia homblei (De Wild.) C.Jeffrey
- Emilia humifusa DC.
- Emilia infralignosa Humbert
- Emilia integrifolia Baker
- Emilia irregularibracteata (De Wild.) C.Jeffrey
- Emilia javanica (Burm.f.) C.B.Rob.
- Emilia jeffreyana Lisowski
- Emilia juncea Robyns
- Emilia kasaiensis Lisowski
- Emilia khaopawtaensis H.Koyama
- Emilia kilwensis C.Jeffrey
- Emilia kivuensis (Muschl.) C.Jeffrey
- Emilia × latens J.Y.Wang & J.C.Wang
- Emilia lejolyana Lisowski
- Emilia leptocephala (Mattf.) C.Jeffrey
- Emilia leucantha C.Jeffrey
- Emilia libeniana Lisowski
- Emilia limosa (O.Hoffm.) C.Jeffrey
- Emilia lisowskiana C.Jeffrey
- Emilia longifolia C.Jeffrey
- Emilia longipes C.Jeffrey
- Emilia longiramea (S.Moore) C.Jeffrey
- Emilia lopollensis (Hiern) C.Jeffrey
- Emilia lubumbashiensis Lisowski
- Emilia luwiikae (D.J.N.Hind & Frisby) Mapaya & Cron
- Emilia lyrata (Cass.) C.Jeffrey
- Emilia malaisseana Lisowski
- Emilia marlothiana (O.Hoffm.) C.Jeffrey
- Emilia mbagoi Beentje & Mesfin
- Emilia micrura C.Jeffrey
- Emilia moutsamboteana Lisowski
- Emilia myriocephala C.Jeffrey
- Emilia negellensis Mesfin & Beentje
- Emilia palhinhana (Torre) Mapaya & Cron
- Emilia pammicrocephala (S.Moore) C.Jeffrey
- Emilia papuana Mattf.
- Emilia parnassiifolia S.Moore
- Emilia perrieri Humbert
- Emilia petitiana Lisowski
- Emilia pinnatifida Merr.
- Emilia praetermissa Milne-Redh.
- Emilia prenanthoidea DC.
- Emilia protracta S.Moore
- Emilia pseudactis C.Jeffrey
- Emilia pumila DC.
- Emilia ramulosa Gamble
- Emilia reddyi Satish & J.Prak.Rao
- Emilia rehmanniana Lisowski
- Emilia rigida C.Jeffrey
- Emilia robynsiana Lisowski
- Emilia scabra DC.
- Emilia schinzii (O.Hoffm.) Cron
- Emilia schmitzii Lisowski
- Emilia serpentina Mesfin & Beentje
- Emilia serrata Humbert
- Emilia shabensis Lisowski
- Emilia simulans C.Jeffrey
- Emilia somalensis (S.Moore) C.Jeffrey
- Emilia sonchifolia (L.) DC.
- Emilia speeseae Fosberg
- Emilia subscaposa Lisowski
- Emilia tenellula (S.Moore) C.Jeffrey
- Emilia tenera (O.Hoffm.) C.Jeffrey
- Emilia tenuicaulis (C.D.Adams) Mapaya & Cron
- Emilia tenuipes C.Jeffrey
- Emilia tenuis C.Jeffrey
- Emilia tessmannii (Mattf.) C.Jeffrey
- Emilia transvaalensis (Bolus) C.Jeffrey
- Emilia tricholepis C.Jeffrey
- Emilia ukambensis (O.Hoffm.) C.Jeffrey
- Emilia ukingensis (O.Hoffm.) C.Jeffrey
- Emilia vanmeelii Lawalrée
- Emilia violacea Cronquist
- Emilia zairensis Lisowski
- Emilia zambiensis (Torre) Mapaya & Cron
- Emilia zeylanica C.B.Clarke
