= Wadithamnus =

Scientific classification
- Kingdom: Plantae
- Clade: Tracheophytes
- Clade: Angiosperms
- Clade: Eudicots
- Order: Caryophyllales
- Family: Amaranthaceae
- Genus: Wadithamnus; T.Hammer & R.W.Davis (2017)
- Species: W. artemisioides

Binomial name
- Wadithamnus artemisioides (Vierh. & O.Schwartz) T.Hammer & R.W.Davis (2017)

Subspecies
- Wadithamnus artemisioides subsp. artemisioides; Wadithamnus artemisioides subsp. batharitica (A.G.Mill. & J.A.Nyberg) T.Hammer & R.W.Davis

Synonyms
- Aerva artemisioides Vierh. & O.Schwartz (1939)

Genus of flowering plants

Wadithamnus artemisioides is a species of flowering plant belonging to the family Amaranthaceae. It is a subshrub or shrub native to Yemen and Oman in the southern Arabian Peninsula. It is the sole species in genus Wadithamnus.

Two subspecies are accepted:

- Wadithamnus artemisioides subsp. artemisioides – southern Yemen
- Wadithamnus artemisioides subsp. batharitica (A.G.Mill. & J.A.Nyberg) T.Hammer & R.W.Davis – southern Oman
