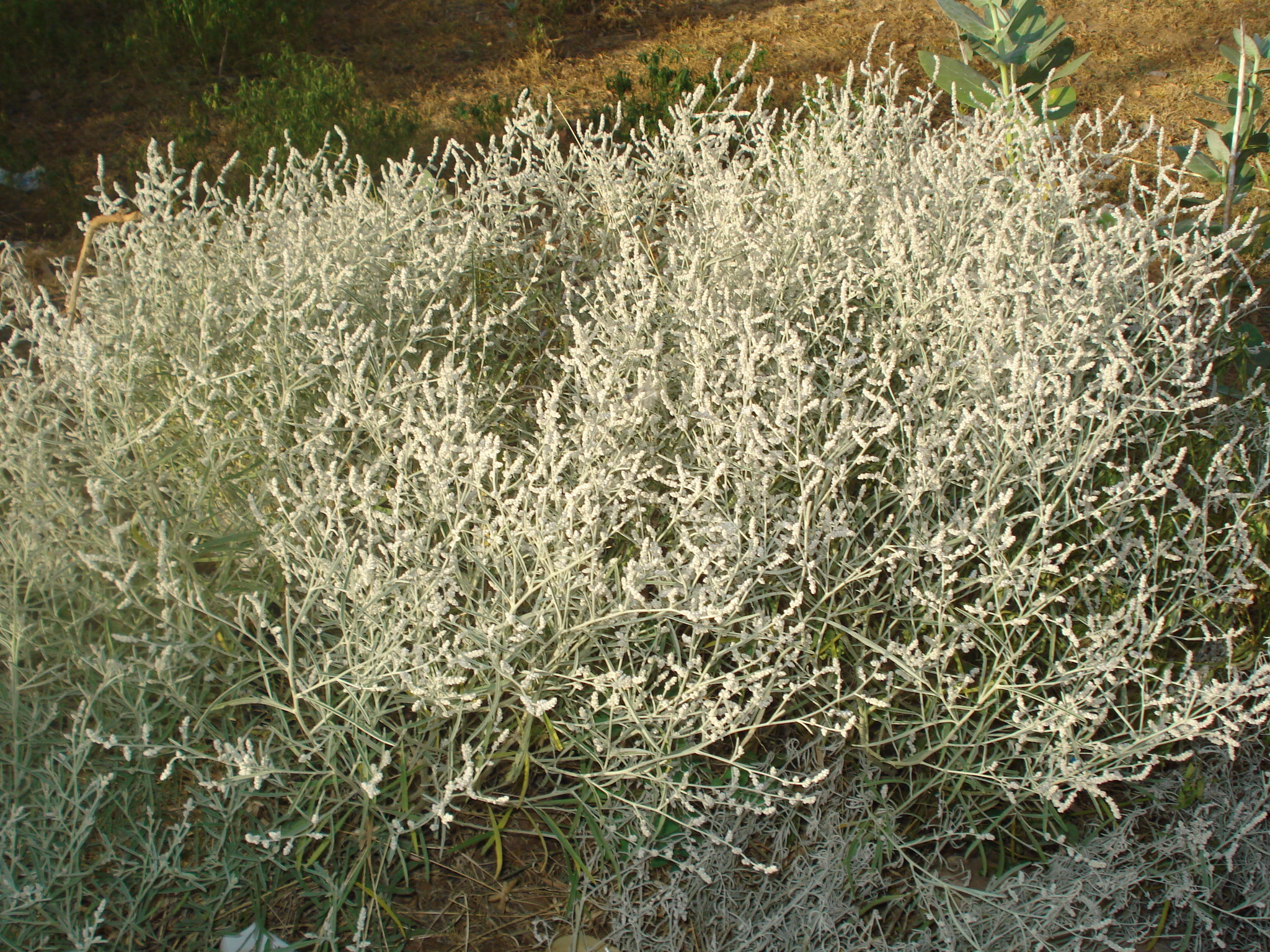

Scientific classification
- Kingdom: Plantae
- Clade: Tracheophytes
- Clade: Angiosperms
- Clade: Eudicots
- Order: Caryophyllales
- Family: Amaranthaceae
- Genus: Aerva
- Species: A. javanica

Binomial name
- Aerva javanica (Burm.f.) Schult.

Synonyms
- Achyranthes javanica Pers. Aerva tomentosa Forssk. Aerva persica (Burm. f.) Merr. Aerva wallichii Moq. Celosia lanata L. Iresine javanica Burm.f. Iresine persica Burm.f.

= Aerva javanica =

Species of flowering plant

Aerva javanica, the kapok bush or desert cotton, is a species of plant in the family Amaranthaceae. It has a native distribution incorporating much of Africa (including Madagascar), and the south-west and south of Asia, and it has become naturalized in northern Australia.

== Description ==
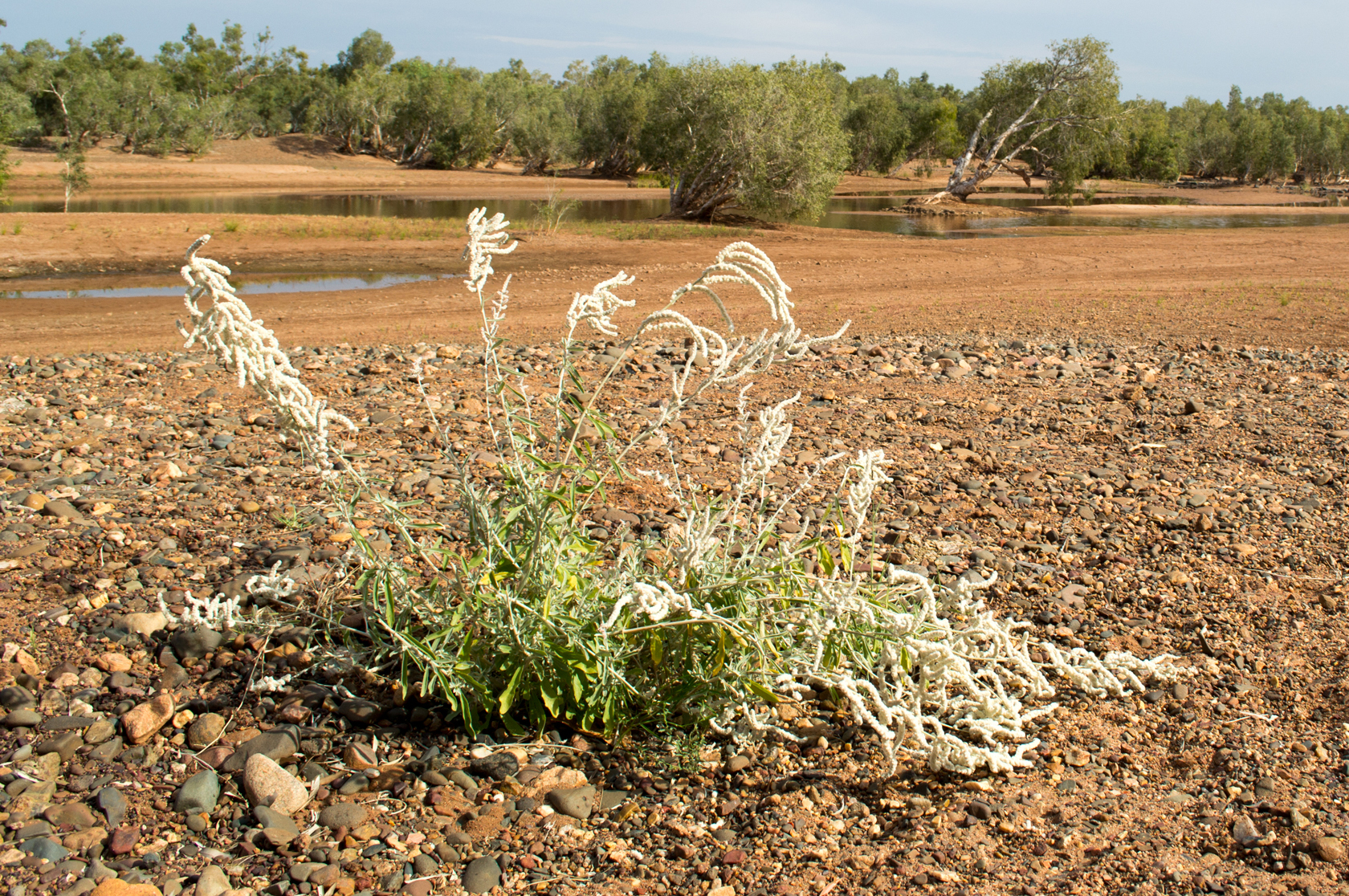
Aerva javanica (Burm.f.) Schult. in the Pilbara, Western Australia

The plant is herbaceous, multi-stemmed and soft-wooded and bears broad leaves; it often has an erect habit and grows to a height of about 1.6 metres (5 ft 3 in). In Western Australia it tends to grow in sandy soils especially along drainage lines. It flowers between January and October. Diplospory, a type of Agamospermy, occurs during the development of female gametophyte in the ovule and hence reduction division does not take place in the Megaspore mother cell. The diploid egg is unfertilized and forms the embryo. Hence daughter plants are exact clones of the mother.

The species uses C_{4} carbon fixation. It is dioecious, meaning male and female flowers are produced on separate individuals.

== Uses ==
This herb is deep rooted, and is used as soil binder in desert reclamation. It is used for fuel and for fodder for goats. In traditional medicine the seeds are believed to cure headaches. A gargle is made from the plant to try to treat toothache.

The plant has naturalised in northern regions of Australia, as an alien introduction, and is cultivated and utilised by the indigenous peoples of some countries. The thick, white inflorescences have traditionally been harvested in Arabia for stuffing cushions and saddle pads. Today, the soft fibres are still used as kapok for pillows. It is called Bilhangga in the languages of the Yindjibarndi and Ngarluma people, the English term is Kapok Bush.
