= Paraerva revoluta =

Conservation status
- Least Concern (IUCN 3.1)

Scientific classification
- Kingdom: Plantae
- Clade: Tracheophytes
- Clade: Angiosperms
- Clade: Eudicots
- Order: Caryophyllales
- Family: Amaranthaceae
- Genus: Paraerva
- Species: P. revoluta

Binomial name
- Paraerva revoluta (Balf.f.) T.Hammer (2019)

Synonyms
- Aerva revoluta Balf.f. (1883); Ouret revoluta (Balf.f.) Kuntze (1891)

Species of flowering plant

Paraerva revoluta is a species of flowering plant in the family Amaranthaceae. It is a shrub endemic to the archipelago of Socotra, which is biogeographically part of East Africa and politically part of Yemen.

It grows in semi-deciduous and evergreen submontane woodlands on the granite slopes of the Hajhir Mountains, where it is locally common in clearings from 500 to 950 meters elevation, and occasionally as low as 250 meters.
