= Paraerva microphylla =

Conservation status
- Least Concern (IUCN 3.1)

Scientific classification
- Kingdom: Plantae
- Clade: Tracheophytes
- Clade: Angiosperms
- Clade: Eudicots
- Order: Caryophyllales
- Family: Amaranthaceae
- Genus: Paraerva
- Species: P. microphylla

Binomial name
- Paraerva microphylla (Moq.) T.Hammer (2019)

Synonyms
- Aerva microphylla Moq. (1849); Aerva microphylla var. humilis Vierh. (1907); Ouret microphylla (Moq.) Kuntze (1891)

Species of flowering plant

Paraerva microphylla is a species of flowering plant in the family Amaranthaceae. It is a subshrub or shrub endemic to the islands of Socotra and Abd al Kuri in the Socotra archipelago off the coast of East Africa, which are politically part of Yemen.

Its natural habitat is dry shrubland, generally on cliffs and rock surfaces, often overlooking the sea. On the island of Socotra it rarely grows above 200 meters elevation, and up to 350 meters on Ras Shu'ub at the western end of the island. On Abd al Kuri and Samhah islands it grows up to 650 meters elevation.
