= Ouret congesta =

Conservation status
- Critically Endangered (IUCN 3.1)

Scientific classification
- Kingdom: Plantae
- Clade: Tracheophytes
- Clade: Angiosperms
- Clade: Eudicots
- Order: Caryophyllales
- Family: Amaranthaceae
- Subfamily: Amaranthoideae
- Genus: Ouret
- Species: O. congesta

Binomial name
- Ouret congesta (Balf.f. ex Baker) Kuntze

Synonyms
- Aerva congesta Balf.f. ex Baker

Herbaceous plant found only on Mauritius

Ouret congesta, the Mascarene amaranth, is a small herbaceous plant of the family Amaranthaceae. It is restricted to the island of Mauritius and the nearby islet Round Island, where it grows on sea cliffs and outcrops of coralline rock. It was discovered on Rodrigues, where it is believed to have now gone extinct. The species is threatened with habitat loss from invasive plants, and the IUCN Red List assesses the species as Critically Endangered.
