= Psilostachys =

Psilostachys is a taxon synonym for three genera of flowering plants:

- Psilostachys Hochst., a synonym of Psilotrichum Blume
- Psilostachys Turcz., a synonym of Cleidion Blume
- Psilostachys Steud., a synonym of Dimeria R.Br.
