= Herbstia =

Herbstia may refer to:

- Herbstia (crab), a genus of crabs belonging to the family Epialtidae
- Herbstia (plant), a monotypic genus of flowering plants belonging to the family Amaranthaceae
- Peribaea, a genus of flies in the family Tachinidae, for which one synonym is Herbstia
