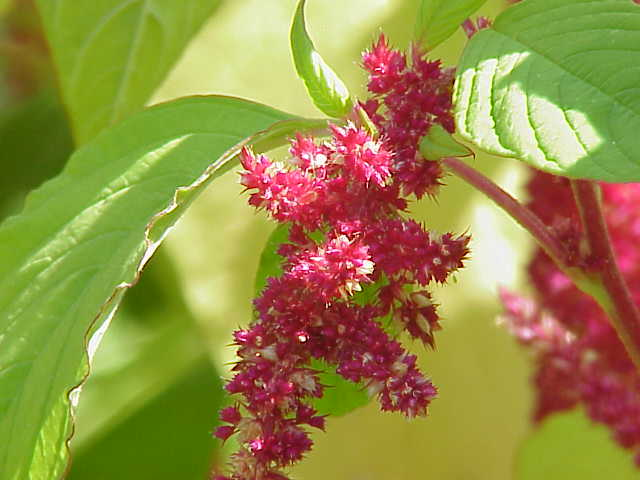
- Amaranthus tricolor

Scientific classification
- Kingdom: Plantae
- Clade: Tracheophytes
- Clade: Angiosperms
- Clade: Eudicots
- Order: Caryophyllales
- Family: Amaranthaceae
- Subfamily: Amaranthoideae; Burnett

Genera
- about 57 genera, see text

= Amaranthoideae =

Subfamily of flowering plants

The Amaranthoideae are a subfamily of the Amaranthaceae. The stamens have anthers with two lobes (locules) and four pollen sacs. The main distribution of the subfamily is in tropical America, in tropical and southern Africa, and in Australia.

The genera Amaranthus (the amaranths) and Celosia (the cockscombs) contain many ornamental species, as well as species whose seeds are used as pseudocereals and leaves as leaf vegetables.

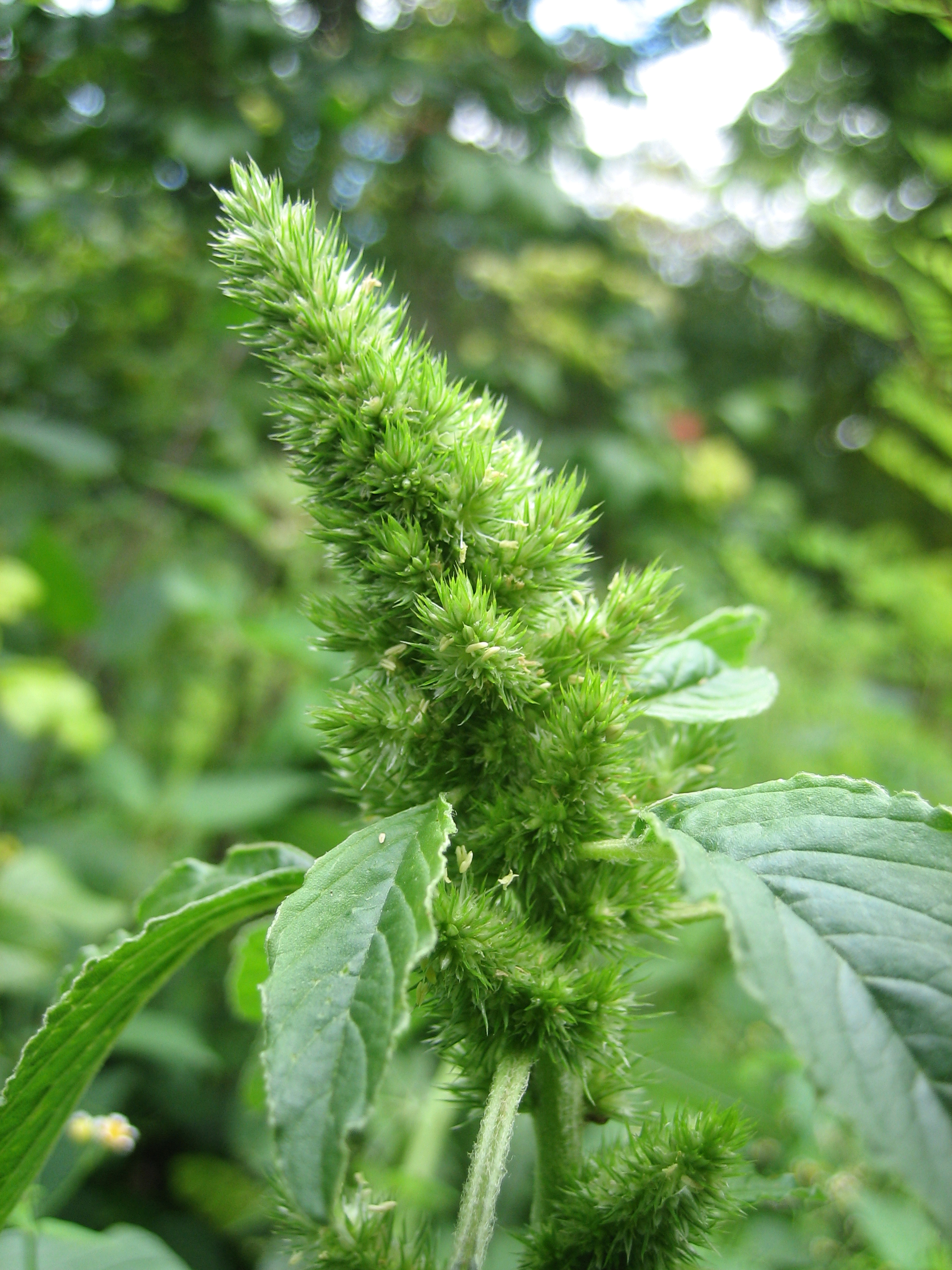
Amaranthus retroflexus, cladus Amaranthoids

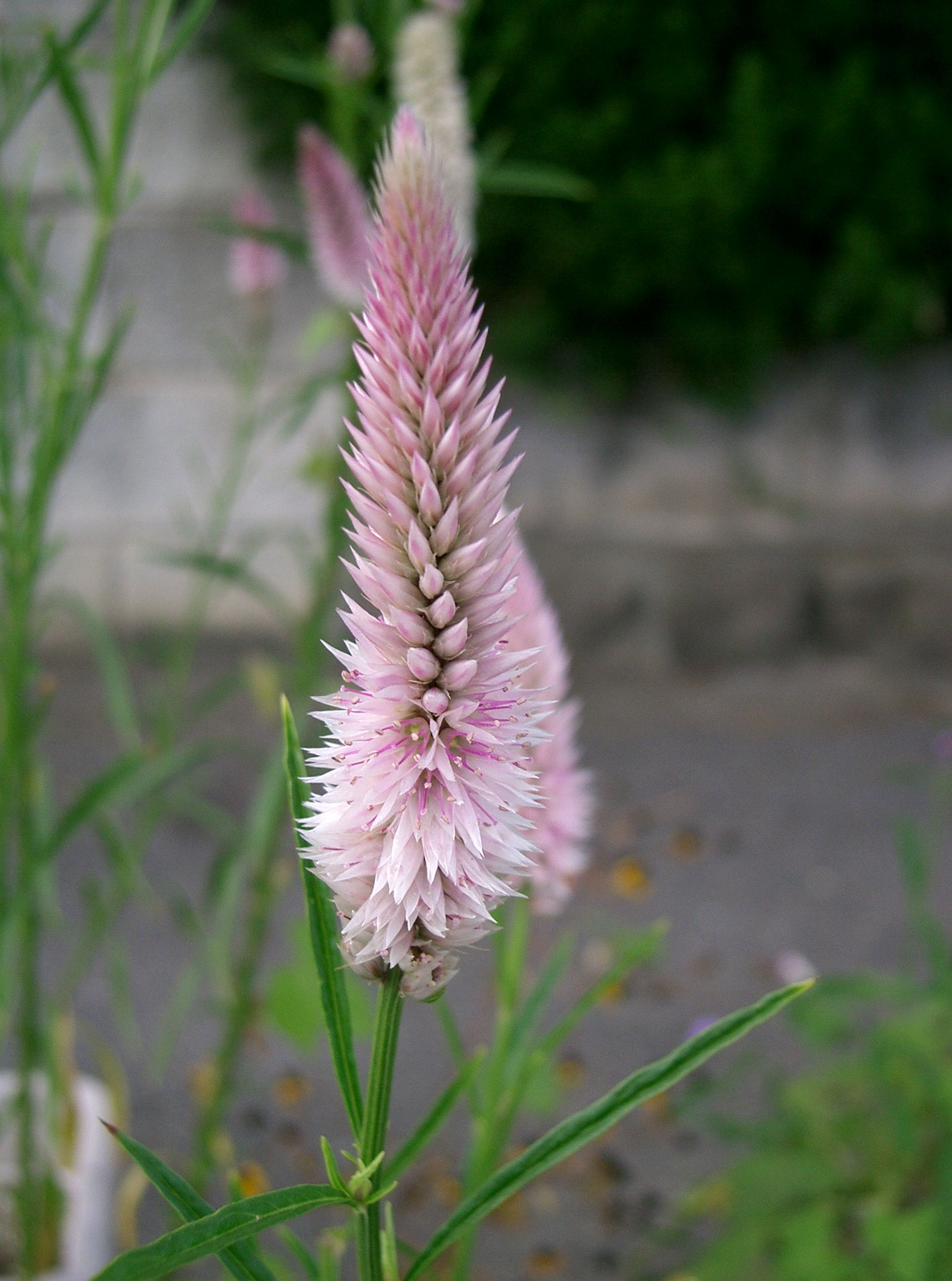
Celosia argentea, Celosieae

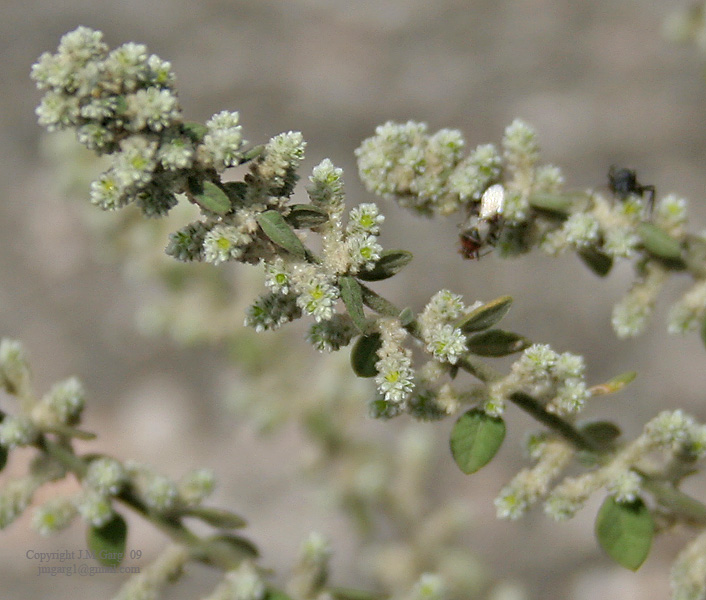
Aerva lanata, cladus Aervoids

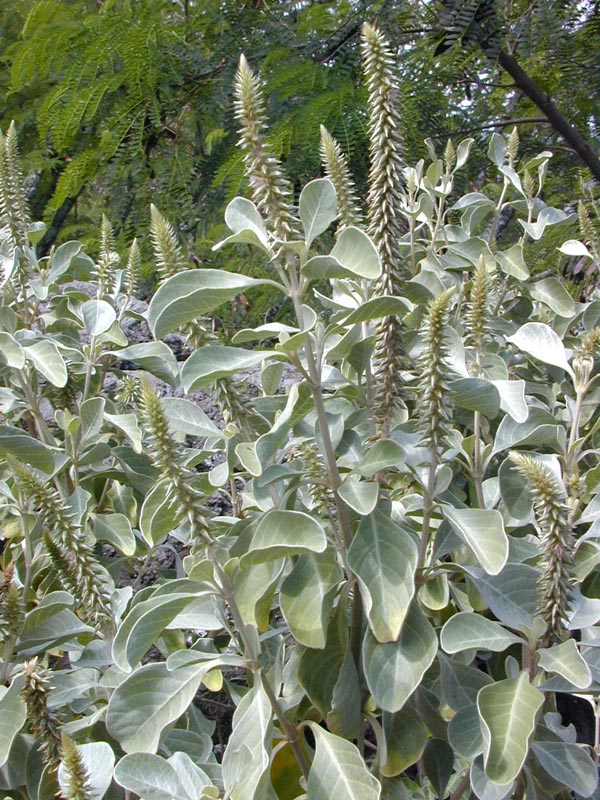
Achyranthes splendens, cladus Achyranthoids

== Systematics ==
The subfamily Amaranthoideae comprises about 57 genera with about 330 species. Phylogenetical research revealed that the subfamily is polyphyletic and its traditional classification (tribe Amarantheae Rchb. with two subtribes Amaranthinae und Aervinae) does not reflect the phylogenetic relationship. Therefore, a new taxonomical grouping is required. Müller & Borsch (2005) recognized several clades:

- basal group:
  - Bosea L., on Macaronesian Islands, and in Cyprus and western Himalaya.
  - Charpentiera Gaudich., endemic to Hawaii and the Australian Ridge (Tubuai-Islands)
- Cladus Amaranthoids:
  - Amaranthus L. (Syn.: Acnida L., Amblogyna Raf.), with about 60 species, occurring also extratropical in temperate regions.
  - Chamissoa Kunth, with about 24 species in Middle and South America.
- Tribus Celosieae, with multiovulate ovaries. This tribe is the only monophyletic one. With about 5 genera and about 69 species:
  - Celosia L., with about 45–60 species.
  - Deeringia R.Br. (Syn.: Cladostachys D.Don, Dendroportulaca Eggli), with about 7 species.
  - Henonia Moq.
  - Hermbstaedtia Rchb., in southern Africa.
  - Pleuropetalum Hook. f.
- Cladus Aervoids, in tropical regions of Africa and Asia:
  - Aerva Forssk., with about 10 species.
  - Nothosaerva Wight
  - Ptilotus R.Br. (Syn.: Dipteranthemum F.Muell., Kelita A.R.Bean, Trichinium R.Br.), with about 110 species in Australia
- Cladus Achyranthoids, in tropical regions of Africa and Asia and on Pacific islands:
  - Achyranthes L., with about 15 species, for example:
    - Achyranthes mutica A.Gray
  - Calicorema Hook. f.
  - Cyathula Blume, with about 27 species.
  - Evelynastra Di Vincenzo, Berends., Wondafr. & Borsch
  - Nototrichium Hillebr.
  - Pandiaka (Moq.) Hook. f.
  - Psilotrichum Blume (Syn.: Psilostachys Hochst.), with about 14 species.
  - Pupalia Juss.
  - Sebsebea Di Vincenzo, Berends., Wondafr. & Borsch
  - Sericostachys Gilg & Lopr.
- Many genera are not yet investigated for their grouping into clades:
  - Achyropsis (Moq.) Hook. f.
  - Allmania R.Br. ex Wight, with only one species:
    - Allmania nodiflora (L.) R.Brown ex Wight, in tropical Asia.
  - Allmaniopsis Suess.
  - Arthraerua (Kuntze) Schinz
  - Centema Hook. f.
  - Centemopsis Schinz
  - Centrostachys Wall.
  - Chionothrix Hook. f.
  - Dasysphaera Volkens ex Gilg, with about 4 species in tropical eastern Africa
  - Digera Forssk.
  - Eriostylos C.C.Towns.
  - Herbstia Sohmer (Syn. Siamosia K.Larsen & Pedersen)
  - Indobanalia A.N.Henry & B.Roy (Syn.: Banalia Moq.)
  - Kyphocarpa (Fenzl) Lopr. (Syn.: Cyphocarpa (Fenzl) Lopr. orth. var.), in southern Africa.
  - Lagrezia Moq. (Apterantha C.H.Wright)
  - Lecosia Pedersen
  - Leucosphaera Gilg
  - Lopriorea Schinz
  - Marcelliopsis Schinz (Syn.: Marcellia Baill.)
  - Mechowia Schinz
  - Nelsia Schinz
  - Neocentema Schinz
  - Nyssanthes R.Br.
  - Omegandra G.J.Leach & C.C.Towns.
  - Pleuropterantha Franch.
  - Polyrhabda C.C.Towns.
  - Psilotrichopsis C.C.Towns.: with 1–3 species in Thailand and the Malaysian peninsula.
  - Rosifax C.C.Towns., with only one species:
    - Rosifax sabuletorum C.C.Towns., endemic to Somalia.
  - Saltia R.Br. ex Moq. (Syn.: Psilodigera Suess.), with only one species:
    - Saltia papposa (Forssk.) Moq., endemic on the southern Arabian peninsula.
  - Sericocoma Fenzl (synonym Pseudosericocoma Cavaco) with 3 species in southern Africa.
  - Sericocomopsis Schinz, with 2 species in tropical East Africa.
  - Sericorema (Hook. f.) Lopr., with 2 species in southern Africa.
  - Stilbanthus Hook. f., with only one species:
    - Stilbanthus scandens Hook. f., in Asia.
  - Trichuriella Bennet (Syn.: Trichurus C.C.Towns.), with only one species:
    - Trichuriella monsoniae (L. f.) Bennet, in Southeast Asia.
  - Volkensinia Schinz, with only one species:
    - Volkensinia prostrata Schinz, in East Africa.
