= Dasysphaera =

Scientific classification
- Kingdom: Plantae
- Clade: Tracheophytes
- Clade: Angiosperms
- Clade: Eudicots
- Order: Caryophyllales
- Family: Amaranthaceae
- Subfamily: Amaranthoideae
- Genus: Dasysphaera; Volkens ex Gilg

Species
- See text

Genus of flowering plants

Dasysphaera is a genus of plants in the amaranth family, Amaranthaceae and is found in Africa distributed in north-east and east tropical Africa.

The genus has four accepted species:

- Dasysphaera alternifolia Chiov.
- Dasysphaera hyposericea (Chiov.) C.C.Townsend
- Dasysphaera robecchii Lopr.
- Dasysphaera tomentosa Lopr.

The species Dasysphaera prostrata has been variably assigned either to the genus Dasysphaera or to Volkensinia.
