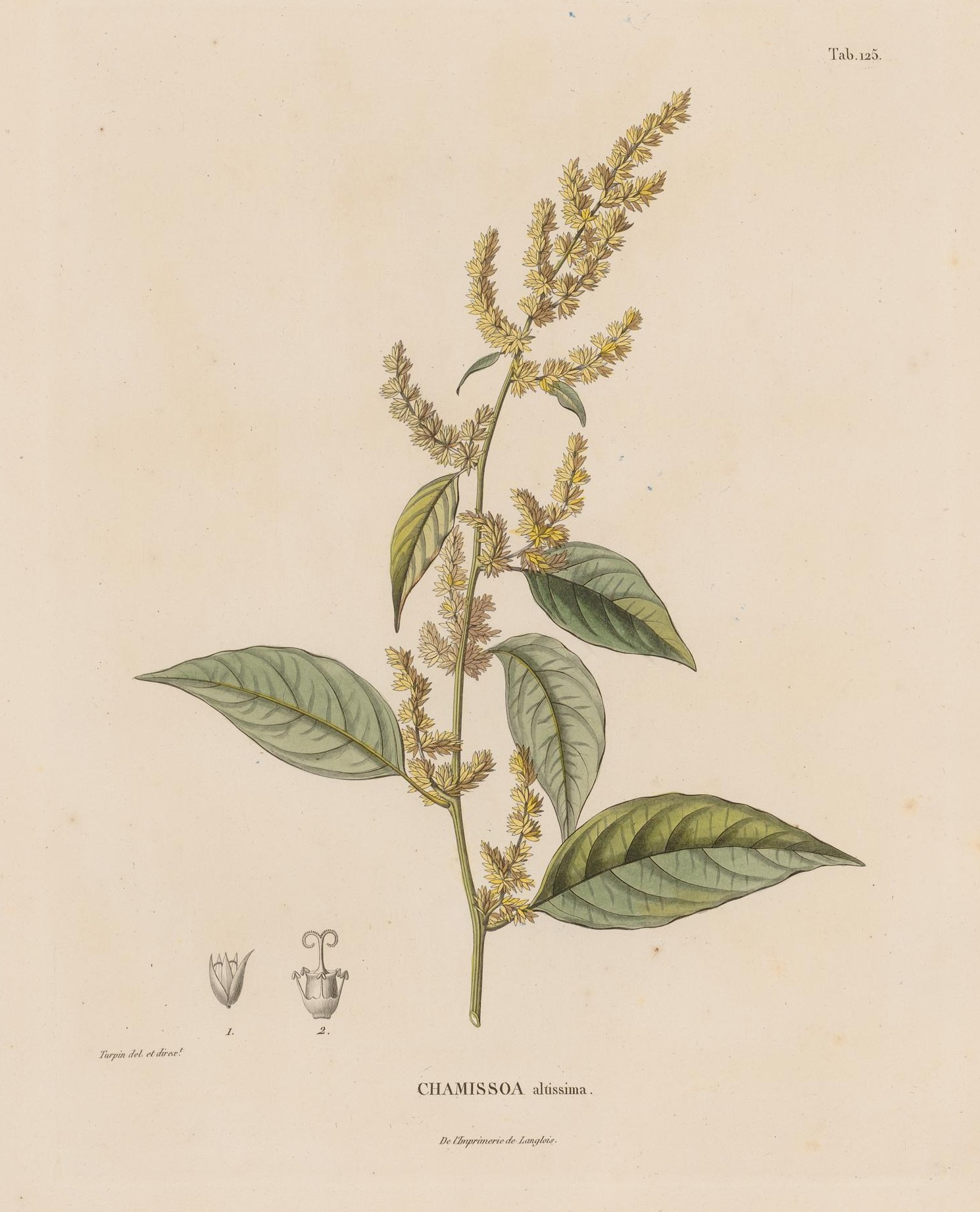

Scientific classification
- Kingdom: Plantae
- Clade: Tracheophytes
- Clade: Angiosperms
- Clade: Eudicots
- Order: Caryophyllales
- Family: Amaranthaceae
- Genus: Chamissoa
- Species: C. altissima

Binomial name
- Chamissoa altissima (Jacq.) Kunth

Synonyms
- Achyranthes altissima Jacq.; Celosia paniculata L.; Celosia tomentosa Willd.

= Chamissoa altissima =

False chaff flower

Species of flowering plant

Chamissoa altissima, or false chaff flower, is native to North and South America. In Brazil it grows in the Cerrado vegetation.

== See also ==
- List of plants of Cerrado vegetation of Brazil
