= Psilotrichum aphyllum =

Conservation status
- Endangered (IUCN 3.1)

Scientific classification
- Kingdom: Plantae
- Clade: Tracheophytes
- Clade: Angiosperms
- Clade: Eudicots
- Order: Caryophyllales
- Family: Amaranthaceae
- Genus: Psilotrichum
- Species: P. aphyllum

Binomial name
- Psilotrichum aphyllum C.C.Towns.

Species of flowering plant

Psilotrichum aphyllum is a species of plant in the family Amaranthaceae. It is endemic to Socotra off the coast of Yemen. Its natural habitats are subtropical or tropical dry forests and rocky areas.
