= Sericocoma =

Scientific classification
- Kingdom: Plantae
- Clade: Tracheophytes
- Clade: Angiosperms
- Clade: Eudicots
- Order: Caryophyllales
- Family: Amaranthaceae
- Genus: Sericocoma; Fenzl (1843)

Synonyms
- Pseudosericocoma Cavaco (1962)

Genus of plants

Sericocoma is a genus of flowering plants belonging to the family Amaranthaceae. Its native range is Southern Africa, including Namibia and the Cape Provinces and Northern Provinces of South Africa.

== Species ==
Three species are currently accepted:

- Sericocoma avolans Fenzl
- Sericocoma heterochiton Lopr.
- Sericocoma pungens Fenzl

=== Formerly placed here ===
- Evelynastra pallida (S.Moore) Di Vincenzo, Berends., Wondafr. & Borsch (as Sericocoma pallida S.Moore)
