= Marcelliopsis =

Scientific classification
- Kingdom: Plantae
- Clade: Tracheophytes
- Clade: Angiosperms
- Clade: Eudicots
- Order: Caryophyllales
- Family: Amaranthaceae
- Genus: Marcelliopsis; Schinz

Synonyms
- Marcellia Baill.

Genus of flowering plant

Marcelliopsis is a genus of flowering plants belonging to the family Amaranthaceae. It is within the subfamily of Amaranthoideae.

It is native to Angola and Namibia.

The genus name of Marcelliopsis is in honour of Claudia Marcella Major (fl. 1st century BC), Roman noblewoman. It was first described and published in H.G.A.Engler, Nat. Pflanzenfam. ed.2, Vol.16c on page 48 in 1934.

== Known species ==
According to Kew:

- Marcelliopsis denudata (Hook.f.) Schinz
- Marcelliopsis splendens (Schinz) Schinz
- Marcelliopsis welwitschii (Hook.f.) Schinz
