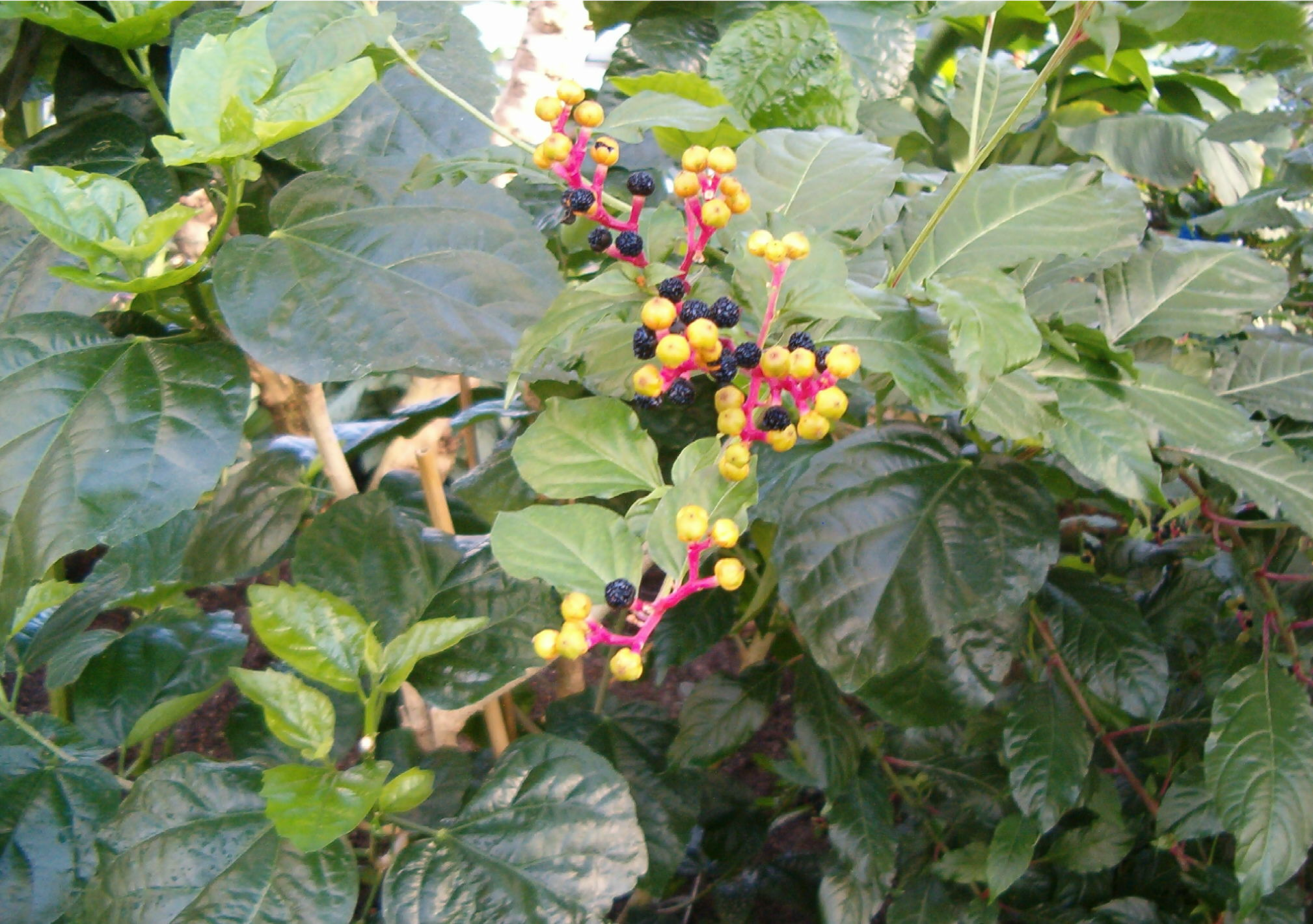
- Pleuropetalum darwinii with berries

Scientific classification
- Kingdom: Plantae
- Clade: Tracheophytes
- Clade: Angiosperms
- Clade: Eudicots
- Order: Caryophyllales
- Family: Amaranthaceae
- Subfamily: Amaranthoideae
- Genus: Pleuropetalum; Hook.f.

= Pleuropetalum =

Genus of flowering plants

Pleuropetalum is a genus of flowering plants in the family Amaranthaceae.

Species include:

- Pleuropetalum darwinii
- Pleuropetalum pleiogynum
- Pleuropetalum sprucei
