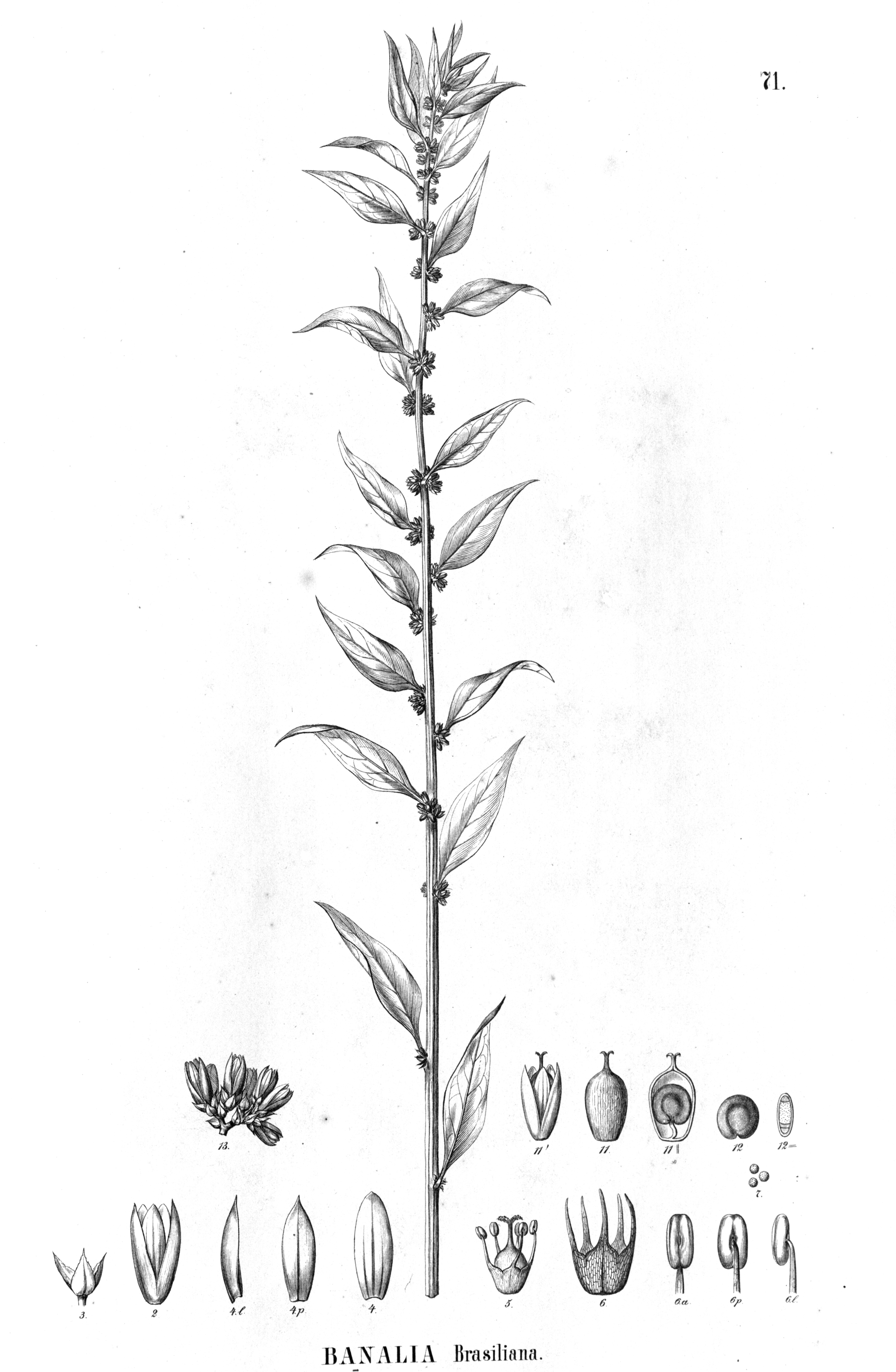
- From 1875, an illustration of Herbstia brasiliana, labelled as Banalia brasiliana

Scientific classification
- Kingdom: Plantae
- Clade: Tracheophytes
- Clade: Angiosperms
- Clade: Eudicots
- Order: Caryophyllales
- Family: Amaranthaceae
- Genus: Herbstia; Sohmer
- Species: H. brasiliana

Binomial name
- Herbstia brasiliana (Moq.) Sohmer

Synonyms
- Banalia brasiliana Moq.; Chamissoa brasiliana (Moq.) R.E.Fr.

= Herbstia brasiliana =

Species of plant

Herbstia is a monotypic genus of flowering plants belonging to the family Amaranthaceae. It only contains one species, Herbstia brasiliana (Moq.) Sohmer It is within the Amaranthoideae subfamily.

== Description ==
A sub-shrub, which has bisexual flowers (bearing both male and female reproductive organs), disposed in 1 or several cymules (a small cyme) clustered in the leaf axils with the ovate.

== Range and habitat ==
It is native to Brazil, Paraguay and north-eastern Argentina. It grows in the Atlantic Rainforest.

== Taxonomy ==
In 1976, botanist Seymour Hans Sohmer (from the University of Wisconsin), was carrying out a study of plants within the genus of Chamissoa (in the family Amaranthaceae of the Caryophyllales order), he found out that Chamissoa brasiliana (Moq.) R.E.Fr. was different to other Chamissoa plants in many ways including; habit, morphology, nature of the seed and fruit. So Sohmer published the plant as Herbstia brasiliana.

The genus name of Herbstia is in honour of Dr. Derral Raymon Herbst (b. 1934), an American botanist in Hawaii. The Latin specific epithet of brasiliana refers to Brazil, where the plant was originally found. Herbstia brasiliana was first described and published in Brittonia Vol.28 on page 450 (in 1976, publ. 1977). The plant was originally called Banalia brasiliana Moq., which was first described and published in A.P.de Candolle, Prodr. Vol.13 Issue 2, on page 278 in 1849.
