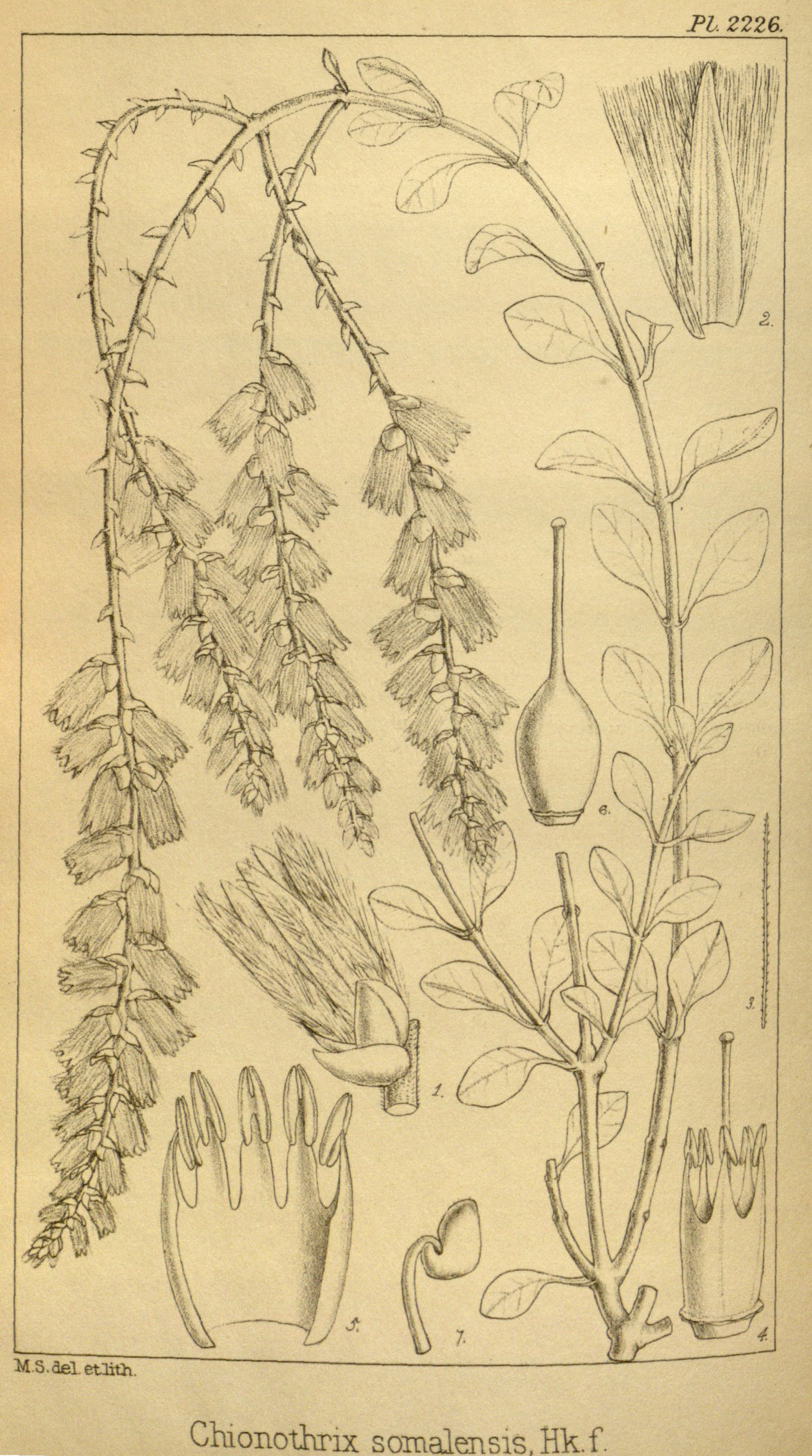
- Chionothrix somalensis

Scientific classification
- Kingdom: Plantae
- Clade: Embryophytes
- Clade: Tracheophytes
- Clade: Spermatophytes
- Clade: Angiosperms
- Clade: Eudicots
- Order: Caryophyllales
- Family: Amaranthaceae
- Subfamily: Amaranthoideae
- Genus: Chionothrix; Hook.f.

Species
- See text

= Chionothrix =

Genus of flowering plants

Chionothrix is a genus of plants in the amaranth family, Amaranthaceae and is found in Africa distributed in north-east tropical Africa.

The genus has 2 accepted species:

- Chionothrix latifolia Rendle
- Chionothrix somalensis (S.Moore) Hook.fil.
