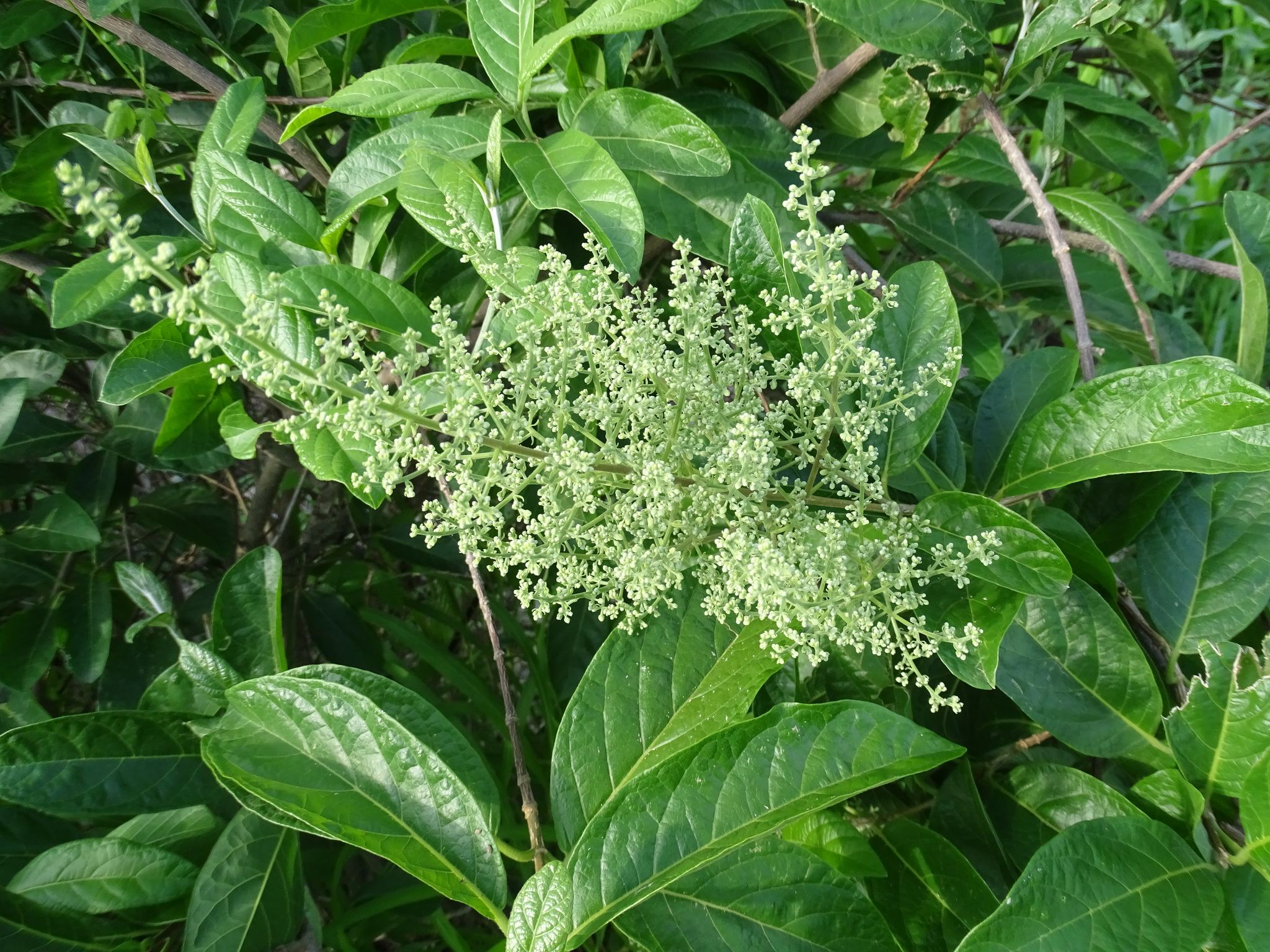
- Lagrezia monosperma

Scientific classification
- Kingdom: Plantae
- Clade: Tracheophytes
- Clade: Angiosperms
- Clade: Eudicots
- Order: Caryophyllales
- Family: Amaranthaceae
- Subfamily: Amaranthoideae
- Genus: Lagrezia; Moq.

Synonyms
- Apterantha C.H.Wright

= Lagrezia =

Genus of plants

Lagrezia is a genus of flowering plants in the family Amaranthaceae.

Its native range is southern Mexico and the western Indian Ocean. It is found in Aldabra, the Chagos Archipelago, Comoros, Madagascar, Mauritius, Mexico and the Seychelles.

The genus name of Lagrezia is in honour of Adrien Rose Arnaud Lagrèze-Fossat (1814 or 1818 – 1874), French botanist and lawyer in Moissac. It was first described and published in A.P.de Candolle, Prodr. Vol.13 (Issue 2) on page 252 in 1849.

== Species ==
The following species are recognised in the genus Lagrezia:

- Lagrezia ambrensis Cavaco
- Lagrezia boivinii (Hook.f.) Schinz
- Lagrezia comorensis Cavaco
- Lagrezia decaryana Cavaco
- Lagrezia humbertii Cavaco
- Lagrezia linearifolia Cavaco
- Lagrezia madagascariensis (Poir.) Moq.
- Lagrezia micrantha (Baker) Schinz
- Lagrezia minutiflora Schinz
- Lagrezia monosperma (Rose) Standl.
- Lagrezia oligomeroides (C.H.Wright) Fosberg
- Lagrezia panicnlata Cavaco
- Lagrezia perrieri Cavaco
- Lagrezia suessengutbii Cavaco
