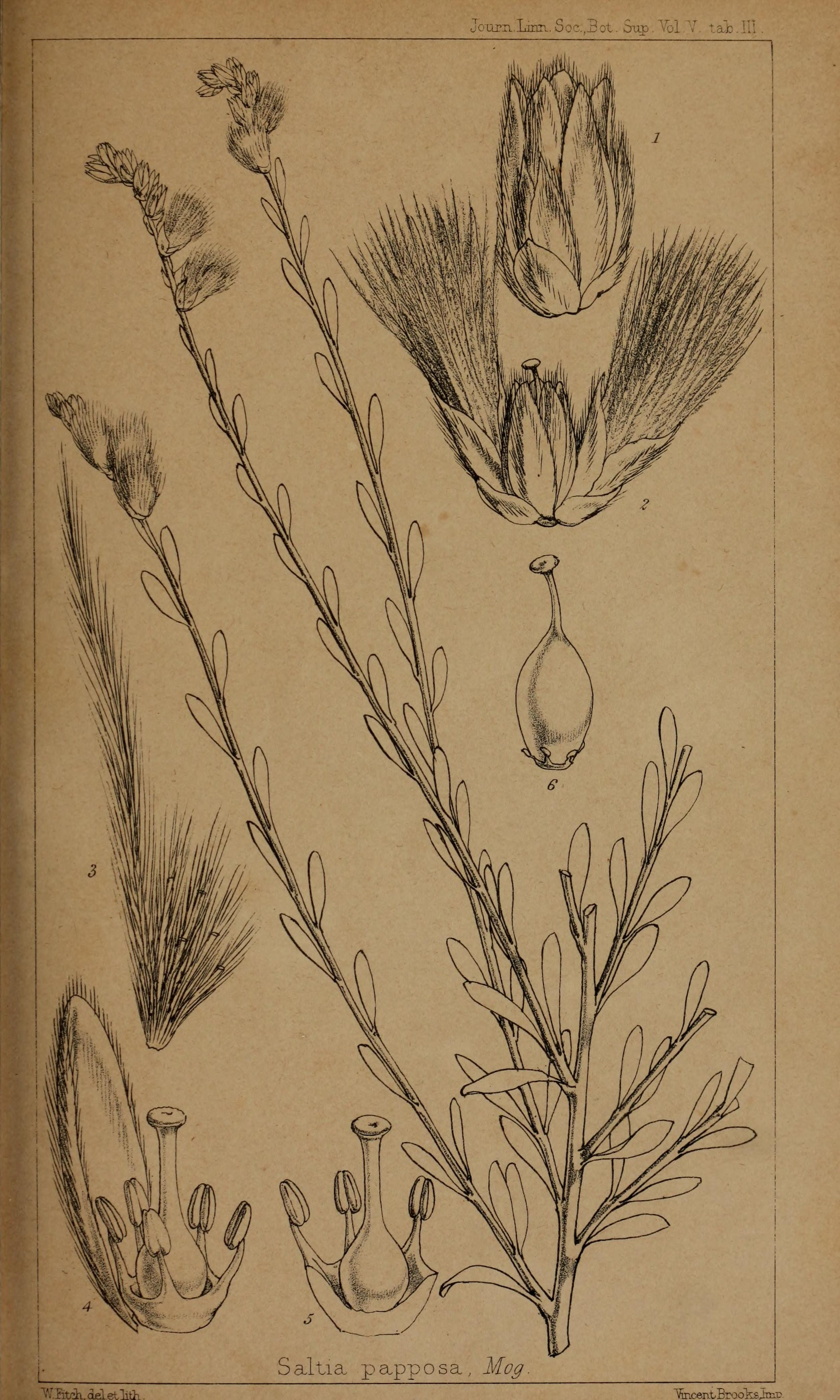
- Illustration of Saltia papposa in 1860

Scientific classification
- Kingdom: Plantae
- Clade: Tracheophytes
- Clade: Angiosperms
- Clade: Eudicots
- Order: Caryophyllales
- Family: Amaranthaceae
- Genus: Saltia; R.Br. ex Moq.
- Species: S. papposa

Binomial name
- Saltia papposa (Forssk.) Moq.

Synonyms
- Genus synonymy: Psilodigera Suess.; Species synonymy: Achyranthes papposa Forssk.; Psilodigera spicata Suess.; Psilotrichum spicatum (Suess.) Cavaco; Saltia seddera Moq., A.P.de Candolle

= Saltia papposa =

Species of flowering plant

Saltia is a monotypic genus of flowering plants belonging to the family Amaranthaceae. It just contains one species, Saltia papposa. It is in the Amaranthoideae subfamily.

It is native to Saudi Arabia and Yemen, in the Arabian Peninsula. It is found on gravel plains with other shrubs.

The genus name of Saltia is in honour of Henry Salt (1780–1827), an English artist, traveller, collector of antiquities, diplomat, and Egyptologist. The Latin specific epithet of papposa refers to pappus the wind-dispersal mechanism for the seeds. It was first described and published in Prodr. Vol.13 (Series 2) on page 325 in 1849.
