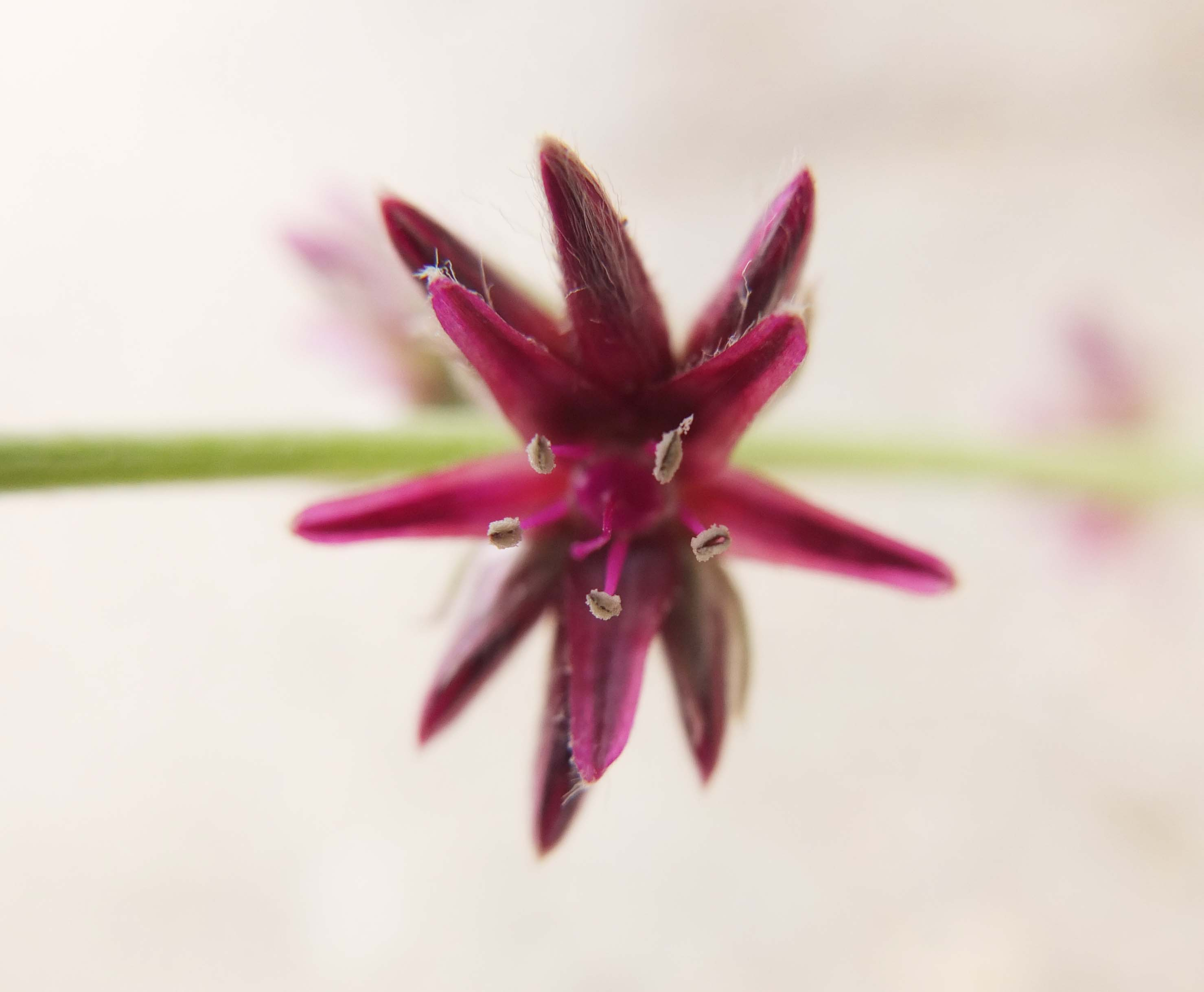
- The flower of Volkensinia or Dasysphaera prostrata, an arid-adapted shrub that grows on saline or alkaline soils in the Lake Turkana region of northern Kenya and Southern Ethiopia

Scientific classification
- Kingdom: Plantae
- Clade: Embryophytes
- Clade: Tracheophytes
- Clade: Angiosperms
- Clade: Eudicots
- Order: Caryophyllales
- Family: Amaranthaceae
- Subfamily: Amaranthoideae
- Genus: Volkensinia; Schinz, 1912
- Species: V. prostrata

Binomial name
- Volkensinia prostrata (Volkens ex Gilg) Schinz

Synonyms
- Dasysphaera prostrata (Volkens ex Gilg) Cavaco; Kentrosphaera prostrata Volkens ex Gilg; Marcellia leptacantha Peter; Marcellia prostrata (Volkens ex Gilg) C.B.Clarke; Volkensinia grandiflora Suess.

= Volkensinia =

Genus of flowering plants

Volkensinia is a monotypic genus of flowering plants belonging to the family Amaranthaceae. It only contains one known species; Volkensinia prostrata. It is in the subfamily Amaranthoideae.

Its native range is north eastern and eastern Tropical Africa, it is found in Ethiopia, Kenya, Sudan and Tanzania.

The genus name of Volkensinia is in honour of Georg Volkens (1855–1917), a German botanist born in Berlin. The Latin specific epithet of prostrata means on the ground as derived from prostrate. Both the genus and the sole species were first described and published in Vierteljahrsschr. Naturf. Ges. Zürich Vol.57 on page 535 in 1912.

The species has been variably assigned either to the genus Dasysphaera or to Volkensinia.
