= Centemopsis kirkii =

Scientific classification
- Kingdom: Plantae
- Clade: Tracheophytes
- Clade: Angiosperms
- Clade: Eudicots
- Order: Caryophyllales
- Family: Amaranthaceae
- Genus: Centemopsis
- Species: C. kirkii

Binomial name
- Centemopsis kirkii (Hook.f.) Schinz

Synonyms
- Achyranthes breviflora Baker; Centema kirkii Hook.f.; Centema rubra Lopr.; Centemopsis clausii Schinz; Centemopsis kirkii subsp. intermedia Suess.; Centemopsis rubra (Lopr.) Schinz; Centrostachys breviflora (Baker) Standl.

Species of plant

Centemopsis kirkii is a species of flowering plant in the genus Centemopsis. It is an annual herb reaching heights of 15–100 cm. It tends to have red inflorescences. It can be found in eastern and southern tropical Africa, ranging from Ethiopia to Mozambique and Angola.
