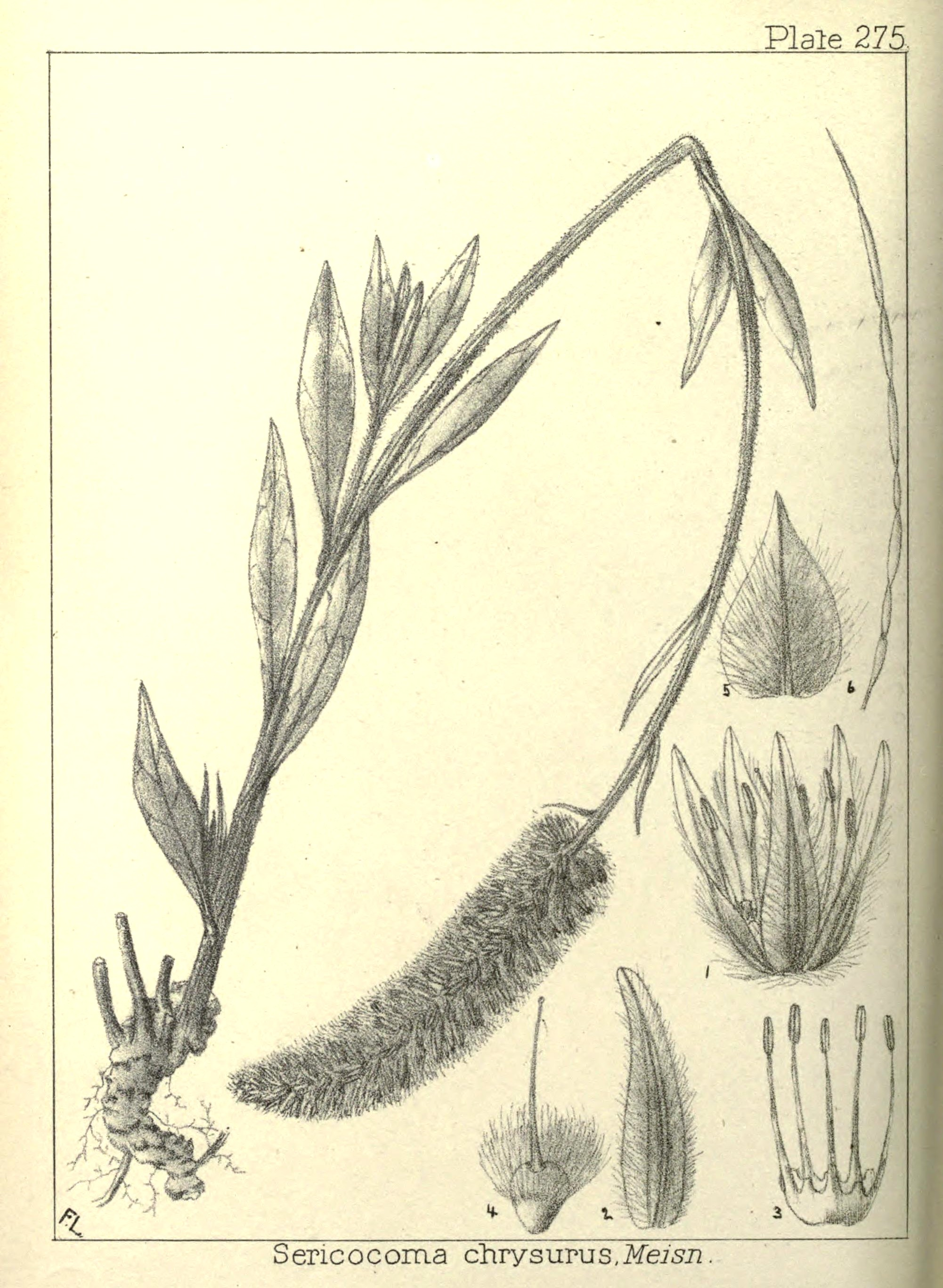
- Kyphocarpa trichinioides

Scientific classification
- Kingdom: Plantae
- Clade: Tracheophytes
- Clade: Angiosperms
- Clade: Eudicots
- Order: Caryophyllales
- Family: Amaranthaceae
- Subfamily: Amaranthoideae
- Genus: Kyphocarpa (Fenzl) Lopr. (1899)

Synonyms
- Dasycalyx F.Muell. (1859); Cyphocarpa orth. var.

= Kyphocarpa =

Genus of flowering plants

Kyphocarpa is a genus of flowering plants belonging to the family Amaranthaceae. It is in the Amaranthoideae subfamily.

Its native range is southern tropical (within Angola, Mozambique, Zambia and Zimbabwe) and southern Africa (with Botswana, Namibia, Eswatini) and also parts of South Africa (within the Cape Provinces, Free State, KwaZulu-Natal and the Northern Provinces).

It was first described and published in Bot. Jahrb. Syst. Vol.27 on page 42 in 1899.

== Known species ==
As accepted by Plants of the World Online:

- Kyphocarpa angustifolia (Moq.) Lopr. – Angola, Botswana, Eswatini, Mozambique, Namibia, South Africa, Zambia, and Zimbabwe
- Kyphocarpa cruciata (Schinz) Schinz – Namibia, Botswana, and the Northern Provinces of South Africa
- Kyphocarpa resedoides Lopr. – Northern Provinces
- Kyphocarpa trichinioides (Fenzl) Lopr. – KwaZulu–Natal
