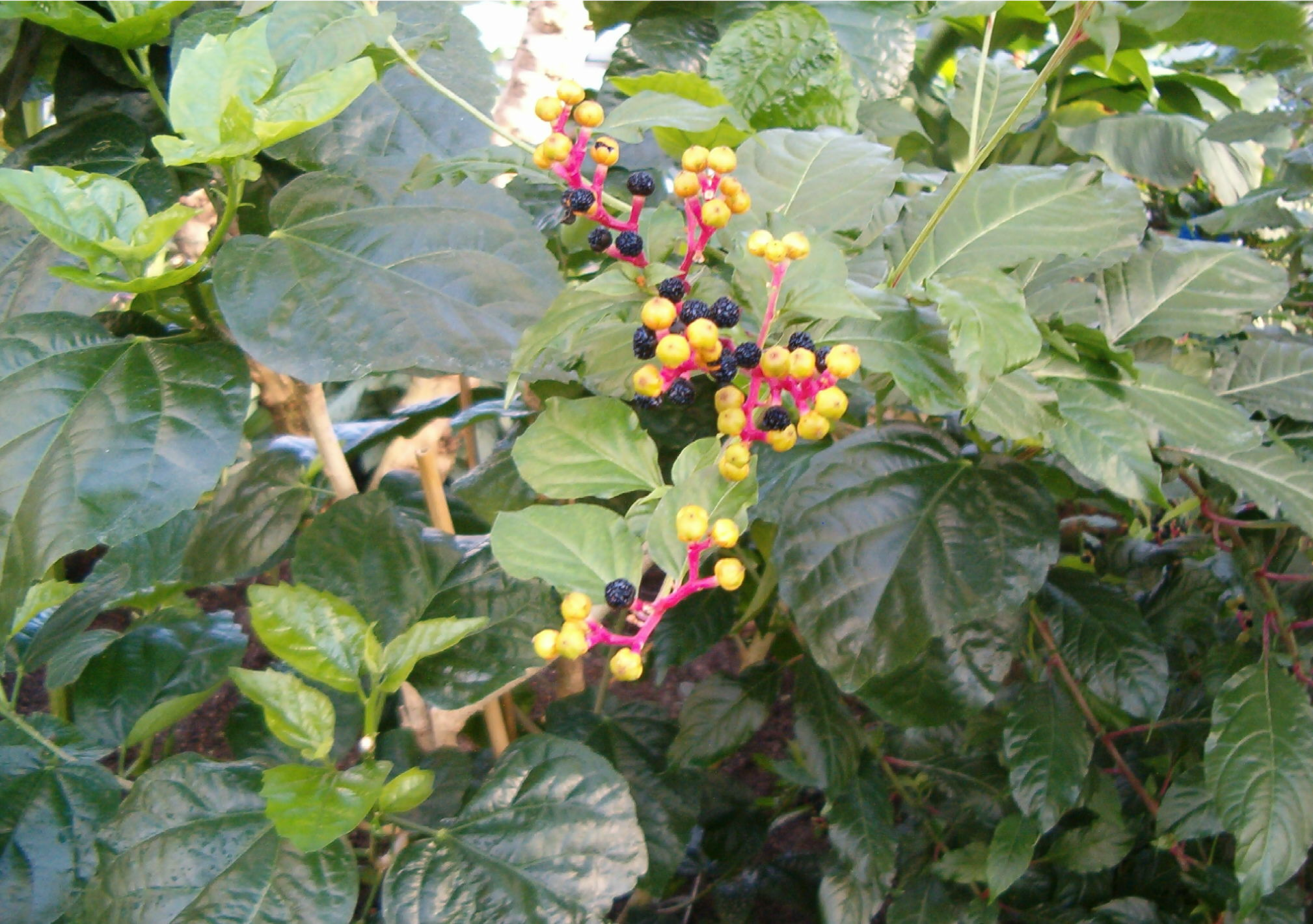

Conservation status
- Vulnerable (IUCN 2.3)

Scientific classification
- Kingdom: Plantae
- Clade: Tracheophytes
- Clade: Angiosperms
- Clade: Eudicots
- Order: Caryophyllales
- Family: Amaranthaceae
- Genus: Pleuropetalum
- Species: P. darwinii

Binomial name
- Pleuropetalum darwinii Hook.f.

= Pleuropetalum darwinii =

Species of flowering plant

Pleuropetalum darwinii is a species of plant in the family Amaranthaceae. It is native to the Galápagos Islands.
