= Centemopsis =

Scientific classification
- Kingdom: Plantae
- Clade: Tracheophytes
- Clade: Angiosperms
- Clade: Eudicots
- Order: Caryophyllales
- Family: Amaranthaceae
- Subfamily: Amaranthoideae
- Genus: Centemopsis; Schinz (1911)

Species
- 13; see text

Synonyms
- Robynsiella Suess. (1938)

Genus of flowering plants

Centemoposis is a genus of plants in the amaranth family, Amaranthaceae and is found in Africa, from Ethiopia and Somalia to Namibia and Mozambique.

== Species ==
13 species are accepted.

- Centemopsis biflora (Schinz) Schinz
- Centemopsis conferta (Schinz) Suess.
- Centemopsis fastigiata (Suess.) C.C.Townsend
- Centemopsis filiformis (E.A.Bruce) C.C.Townsend
- Centemopsis glomerata (Lopr.) Schinz
- Centemopsis gracilenta (Hiern) Schinz
- Centemopsis graminea (Suess. & Overk.) C.C.Townsend
- Centemopsis kirkii (Hook.fil.) Schinz
- Centemopsis longipedunculata (Peter) C.C.Townsend
- Centemopsis micrantha Chiov.
- Centemopsis polygonoides (Lopr.) Suess.
- Centemopsis sordida C.C.Townsend
- Centemopsis trinervis Hauman
