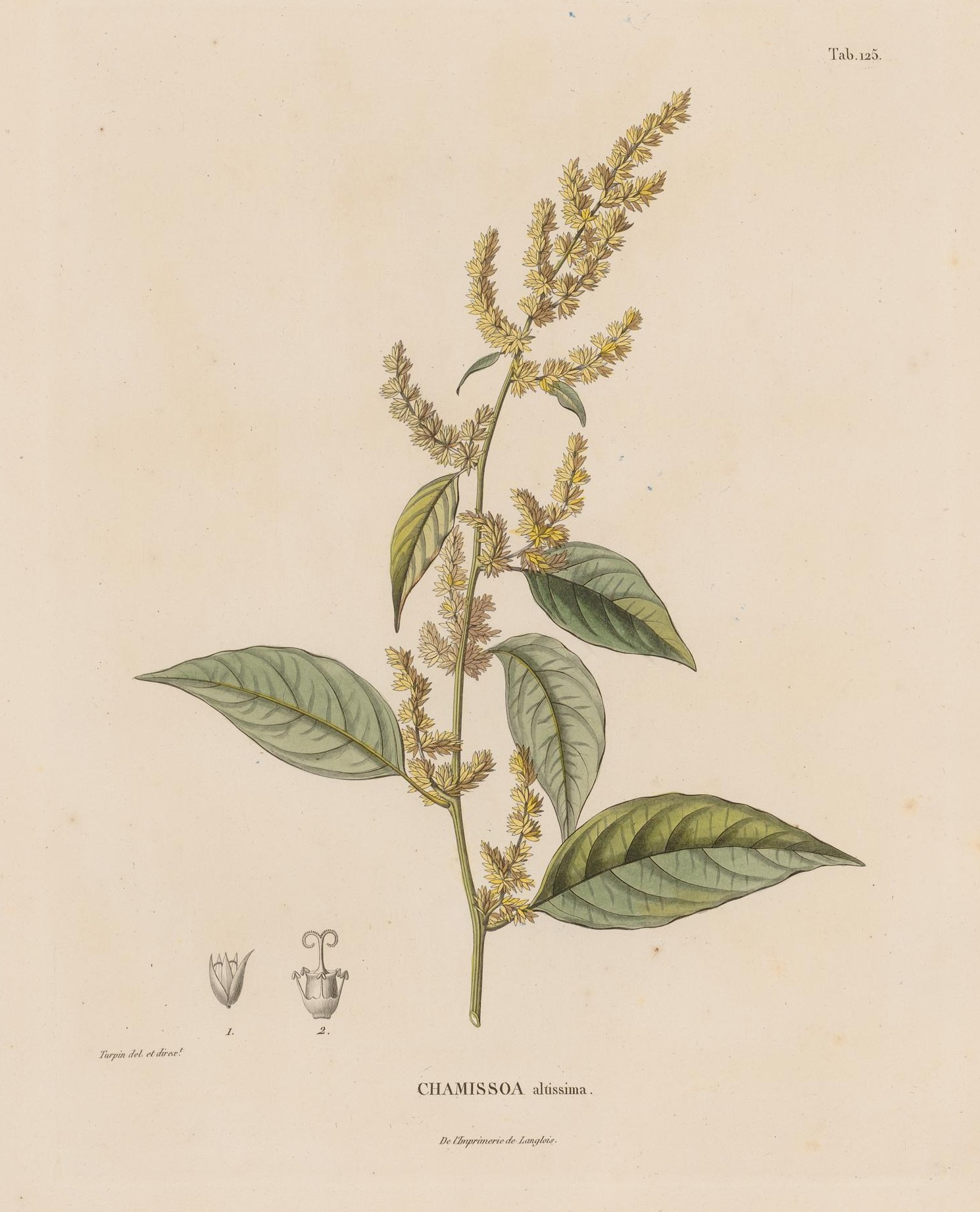
- Chamissoa altissima

Scientific classification
- Kingdom: Plantae
- Clade: Tracheophytes
- Clade: Angiosperms
- Clade: Eudicots
- Order: Caryophyllales
- Family: Amaranthaceae
- Subfamily: Amaranthoideae
- Genus: Chamissoa; Kunth (1817)

Species
- Chamissoa acuminata Mart.; Chamissoa altissima (Jacq.) Kunth - False chaff flower; Chamissoa maximiliani Mart. ex Moq.

Synonyms
- Kokera Adans. (1763)

= Chamissoa =

Genus of flowering plants

Chamissoa is a genus of flowering plants in the family Amaranthaceae of the Caryophyllales order.

The genus was named in honor of 19th century botanist Adelbert von Chamisso, by Carl Sigismund Kunth. It is native to North and South America.

This genus is sometimes included in the family Chenopodiaceae.

== Species ==
Three species are accepted.

- Chamissoa acuminata Mart. – central Mexico to northeastern Argentina
- Chamissoa altissima (Jacq.) Kunth – False chaff flower – Mexico and the Caribbean to northern Argentina
- Chamissoa maximiliani Mart. ex Moq. – Peru and northeastern Brazil to northern Argentina
