= Evelynastra =

Scientific classification
- Kingdom: Plantae
- Clade: Tracheophytes
- Clade: Angiosperms
- Clade: Eudicots
- Order: Caryophyllales
- Family: Amaranthaceae
- Subfamily: Amaranthoideae
- Genus: Evelynastra; Di Vincenzo, Berends., Wondafr. & Borsch
- Species: E. pallida

Binomial name
- Evelynastra pallida (S.Moore) Di Vincenzo, Berends., Wondafr. & Borsch

Synonyms
- Kyphocarpa pallida (S.Moore) C.B.Clarke; Sericocoma pallida S.Moore (1877) (basionym); Sericocomopsis pallida (S.Moore) Schinz; Sericocomopsis pallida var. grandis Suess.; Sericocomopsis pallida var. parvifolia Suess.

Genus of flowering plants

Evelynastra is a genus of flowering plants in the family Asteraceae. It includes a single species, Evelynastra pallida, a subshrub or shrub native to northeastern and eastern tropical Africa, ranging from Ethiopia through Djibouti, Somalia, and Kenya to northern Tanzania. It grows in deserts and dry shrublands.

The species was first described as Sericocoma pallida by Spencer Le Marchant Moore in 1877. In 2024 Vanessa Di Vincenzo et al. placed the species in the new monotypic genus Evelynastra. The genus is named for Di Vicenzo's daughter Evelyn, with the ending -astra referring to the stellate hairs of the indumentum of stem and leaves which are characteristic of the genus and the Achyranthoid clade to which it belongs.
