= Psilotrichum =

Scientific classification
- Kingdom: Plantae
- Clade: Tracheophytes
- Clade: Angiosperms
- Clade: Eudicots
- Order: Caryophyllales
- Family: Amaranthaceae
- Subfamily: Amaranthoideae
- Genus: Psilotrichum; Blume

Synonyms
- Leiospermum Wall.; Poechia Endl.; Psilostachys Hochst.

Genus of flowering plants

Psilotrichum is a genus of flowering plants in the family Amaranthaceae. It includes 26 species native to tropical Africa, the Arabian Peninsula, and tropical Asia.

== Species ==
26 species are accepted.

- Psilotrichum amplum Suess.
- Psilotrichum aphyllum C.C.Towns.
- Psilotrichum axilliflorum Suess.
- Psilotrichum cyathuloides Suess. & Launert
- Psilotrichum erythrostachyum Gagnep.
- Psilotrichum fallax C.C.Towns.
- Psilotrichum ferrugineum (Roxb.) Voigt
- Psilotrichum gloveri Suess.
- Psilotrichum gnaphalobryum (Hochst.) Schinz
- Psilotrichum gracilipes Hutch. & E.A.Bruce
- Psilotrichum lanatum C.C.Towns.
- Psilotrichum laxiflorum Cavaco
- Psilotrichum leptostachys C.C.Towns.
- Psilotrichum madagascariense Cavaco
- Psilotrichum majus Peter
- Psilotrichum nudum (B.Heyne ex Wall.) Moq.
- Psilotrichum patulum (Willd.) I.M.Turner
- Psilotrichum schimperi Engl.
- Psilotrichum scleranthum Thwaites
- Psilotrichum sericeum (J.Koenig ex Roxb.) Dalzell
- Psilotrichum stenanthum C.C.Towns.
- Psilotrichum suffruticosum C.C.Towns.
- Psilotrichum tomentosum Chiov.
- Psilotrichum virgatum C.C.Towns.
- Psilotrichum vollesenii C.C.Towns.
- Psilotrichum yunnanense D.D.Tao
