= Georg Volkens =

German botanist (1855-1917)

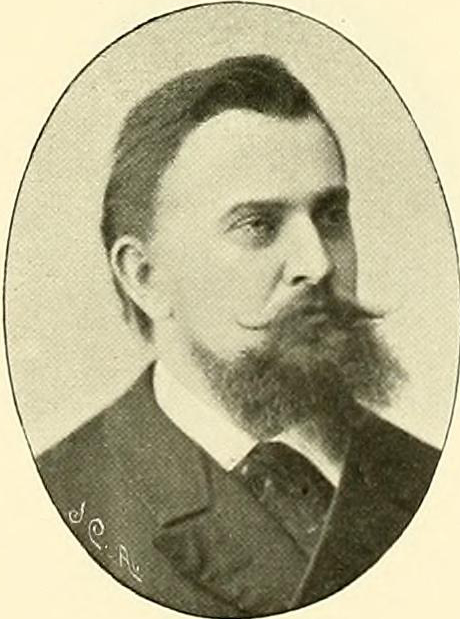
Georg Volkens

Georg Ludwig August Volkens (13 July 1855 – 10 January 1917) was a German botanist born in Berlin.

He studied natural sciences at the Universities of Berlin and Würzburg, graduating in 1882 with the thesis Ueber Wasserausscheidung in liquider Form an den Blaettern hoeherer Pflanzen. As a student he was influenced by Alexander Braun (1805–1877), Julius von Sachs (1832–1897) and Simon Schwendener (1829–1919).

In 1884-85 he conducted botanical research in Egypt on behalf of the Königlich-Preußischen Akademie der Wissenschaften. In 1887 he obtained his habilitation, followed by work as an assistant to Adolf Engler (1844–1930) at the Botanical Museum in Berlin. Later he journeyed to East Africa, where he performed phytogeographical studies at Mount Kilimanjaro, as well as conducting investigations on the regions' resources from an economic standpoint. On the expedition he collected numerous plant species new to science.

In the years 1899 to 1900 he took part in a scientific/economic mission to the Mariana and Caroline Islands, where he spent seven months on the island of Yap. In 1902 he performed botanical duties at Buitzenborg, Java in an effort to distribute plants to Africa, New Guinea, Samoa and the Carolines for agricultural purposes. In 1900 he returned to Berlin, where he taught classes and conducted scientific research at the museum.

The plant genus Volkensinia is named after him, as are numerous botanical species. Another genus was named Volkensiella H.Wolff, but that is now a synonym of Oenanthe L.

== Selected writings ==
- Die Flora der ägyptisch-arabischen Wüste, auf Grundlage anatomisch-physikalischer Forschungen dargestellt (The flora of the Egyptian-Arabian desert, shown on the basis of anatomical and physiological research), 1887
- Chenopodiaceae in: Engler-Prantl's "Natürliche Pflanzenfamilien". III, 1, a, p 36–91. 1892
- Der Kilimandscharo, 1897
- Über die Bestäubung einiger Loranthaceen und Proteaceen. Festschrift für Schwendener. S. 251–270. (On the pollination of some Loranthaceae and Proteaceae), 1899.
- Laubfall und Lauberneuerung in den Tropen, (Leaf fall and leaf regeneration in the tropics), 1911.
