= Wildlife of the Levant =

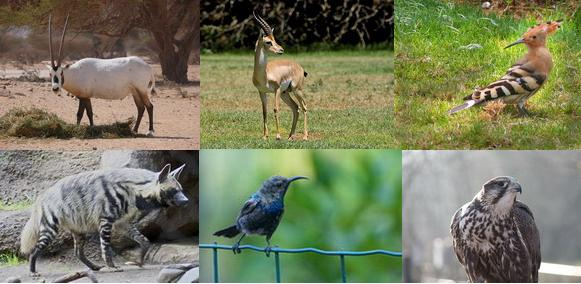
National animals of the Levant: Arabian oryx (Jordan), mountain gazelle and hoopoe (Palestine), striped hyena (Lebanon), Palestine sunbird (Palestine), and saker falcon (Syria)

The wildlife of the Levant encompasses all types of wild plants and animals, including mammals, birds, reptiles, amphibians, fresh and saltwater fish, and invertebrates, that inhabit the region historically known as the Levant, the Sham, or Greater Syria. This is the region that today includes the following countries: Jordan, Israel, Palestine, Syria, Lebanon, Hatay Province of Turkey and the areas of Turkish occupation of northern Syria, to which some add Cyprus and part of the Sinai Peninsula.

The Levantine region is notable for its remarkable biodiversity, which is a consequence of its diverse climatic conditions and its strategic location at the crossroads of the ancient world, encompassing Asia, Africa, and Europe. This has resulted in the region acting as a conduit for the migration of numerous species, both northward and southward, and has led to distinct and occasionally conflicting climatic patterns. This enabled a vast array of creatures to colonize it. A significant number of species of megafauna in the Levant have become extinct as a result of the destruction of natural habitats for human settlement and exploitation, or due to overhunting since ancient times. Since the late 20th century, several nature reserves have been established throughout the Levant, sometimes through local and international efforts, to preserve the remaining animal species and their natural habitats. Some of these reserves have successfully preserved wildlife and their habitats.

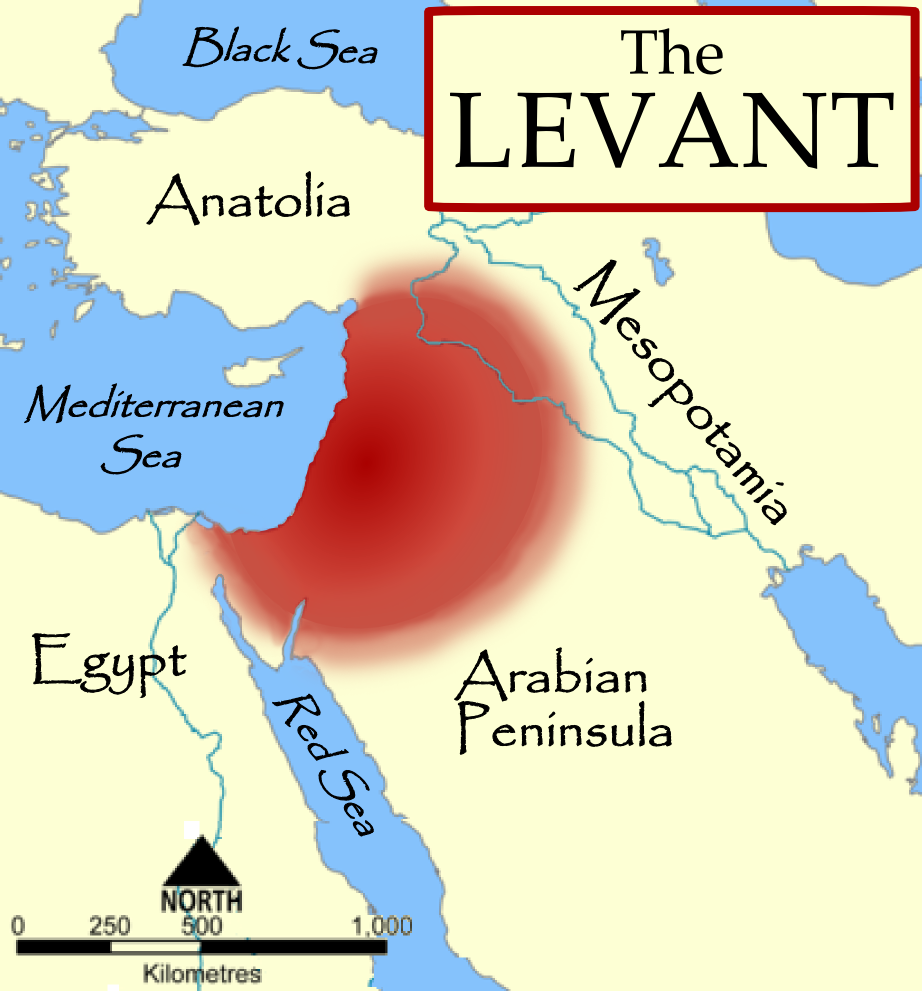
The Levant's location at the center of the three continents of classical antiquity: Asia, Europe, and Africa

== The importance of the Levant in biodiversity and the emergence of agriculture ==
The Levant and Iraq (the Fertile Crescent) represent the origin of numerous plants that were subsequently domesticated and became integral to agricultural practices. These include two varieties of wheat, barley, lentils, chickpeas, caraway, peas, and flax, collectively known as the founding crops of civilization. Additionally, fruit trees such as almonds, olives, figs, and a diverse array of medicinal, aromatic, and ornamental plants originated in this region.

As posited by botanist George Edward Post, the Levant is of paramount importance on Earth, not only due to the pivotal human events that have transpired there, but also due to its distinctive geological structure and the remarkable diversity of its terrain, climate, fauna, and flora.

== Geographic location and terrain ==
The Levant denotes the eastern coast of the Mediterranean Sea, extending eastward to the borders of Mesopotamia and extends from the Taurus Mountains in the north to the Sinai Peninsula in the south. The Levant is distinguished by the presence of two parallel mountain ranges, the western and eastern, which extend from the northern to the southern extremities of the region in a north–south orientation parallel to the coastline.

The West Coastal Range is located in the White River region near Kahramanmaraş. Situated between the Taurus and Amanus mountains. Its northernmost point is at the confluence of these two mountain ranges. The Amanous Range extends to the Orontes River gully in the Gulf of Suwaidiya, with a maximum elevation of 2,240 meters. A second series, complementary to the first, extends from the mouth of the Orontes River to the southern Nahr al-Kabir. This series is known as the Nusairiya Mountains. The Akkar Plain serves to differentiate the Nusairiya Mountains from their southern extension within Mount Lebanon, in this latter region, the highest mountains of the Levant are situated and reach a peak height of 3088 meters in Qurnat as Sawda'. Proceeding in a southerly direction, the mountains begin to recede from the sea and gradually diminish in height. The highest peak in the Galilee (Jabal al-Jarmaq) reaches an altitude of 1,208 meters. The Nablus Mountains originate from Mount Carmel in Haifa and extend until they merge with the Hebron Mountains in the south. The hilly and mountainous areas continue to Ras Muhammad in the southernmost part of Sinai. Mount Ebal is the highest peak in the Nablus Mountains (981 m), while the Hebron Mountains reach their highest point at Halhul (1020 m). The length of this mountain range, extending from Kahramanmaraş to Ras Muhammad, exceeds 1,100 kilometers.

The parallel chain begins with a group of hills from roughly the same point at an area called Kapu Tcham near Marash and extends south to Suf Dagh and Aleppo Mountain. It then turns into ranges of hills down to the Homs Plain and the Akkar Plain, which form Inner Syria's window to the sea. The Qalamoun Mountains, which extend from south of Homs to Damascus and meet with the Golan Heights at Mount Hermon, with its highest peak at 2814 meters, constitute the next segment of the chain. After a plain that extends for approximately 60 kilometers through Hauran, the Ajloun mountain range begins. The chain continues through the As-Salt, Moab, and Al-Sharat mountains to the Gulf of Aqaba, where it connects with the Hijaz Mountains.

In addition to the two mountain ranges previously mentioned, there are numerous other internal mountains scattered throughout the region. These include Jabal al-Balaas, the Palmyrene mountain range, Mount Abdulaziz, and Jabal al-Druze. Inland, the highest peaks in Jabal al-Druze reach approximately 1,840 meters.

A deep, narrow valley extends between these two mountain ranges, forming the northern portion of the Great Rift Valley. This valley contains the lowest point on Earth's surface. The Orontes River has its source in the center of the gully and flows northward between the two mountain ranges in the Beqaa Valley, the Al-Ghab Plain, and the Amik Valley, ultimately discharging into the Mediterranean Sea. From a nearby point, the Jordan River rises and flows in a southerly direction, traversing the Hula Valley, the edges of the Beisan Plain, and the Jordan Valley, before ultimately flowing into the Dead Sea, the lowest point on Earth's surface.

To the west of the coastal range lies a narrow coastal plain strip that widens and narrows. The coastal plain reaches its maximum width in the south of the Gaza Strip, where it disappears completely at certain points, such as Jebel Aqra, situated to the south of the Alexandretta, and in Jounieh and Mount Carmel, where the feet of the mountains are washed by seawater.

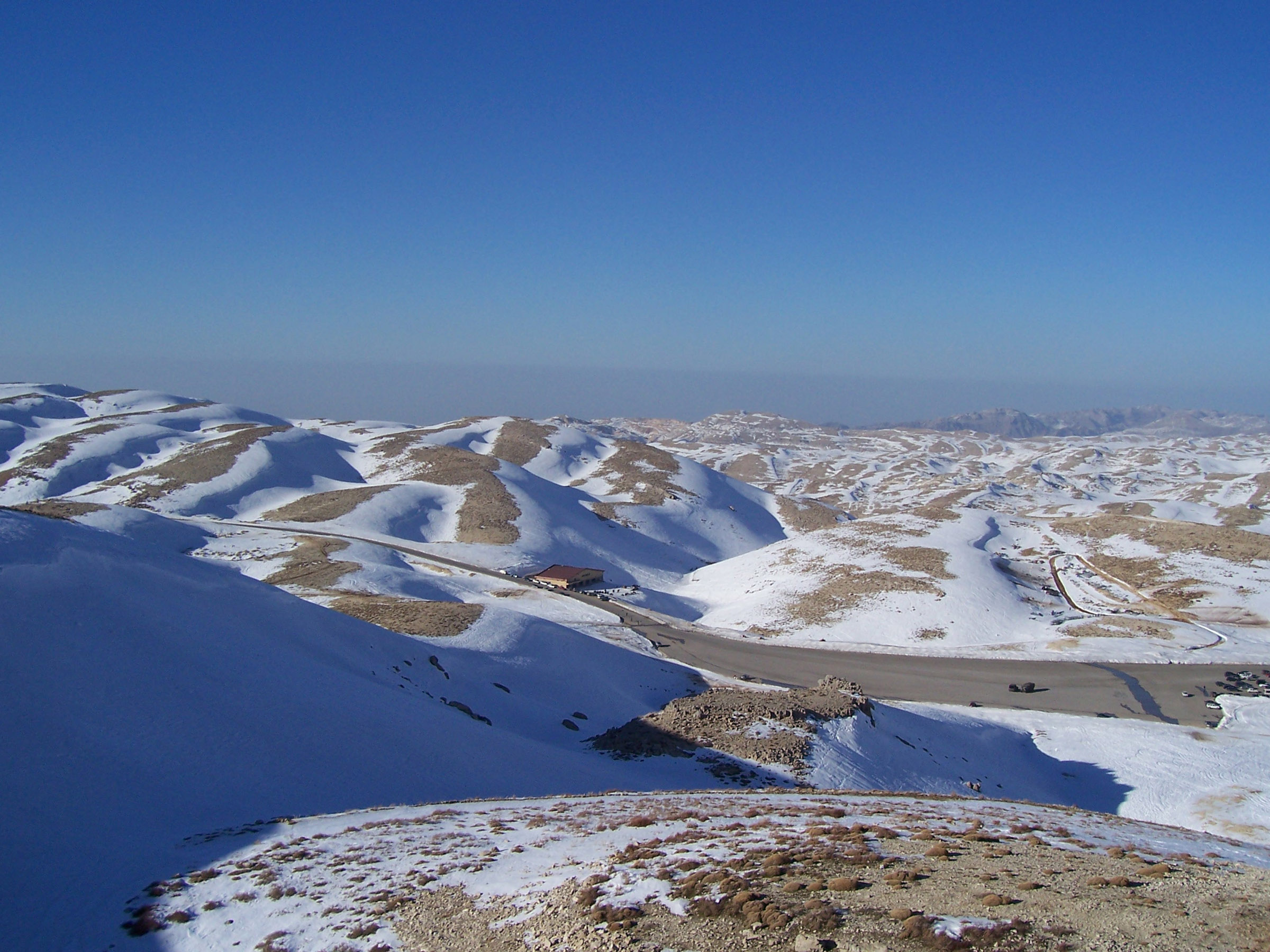
The Faria mountains in Lebanon

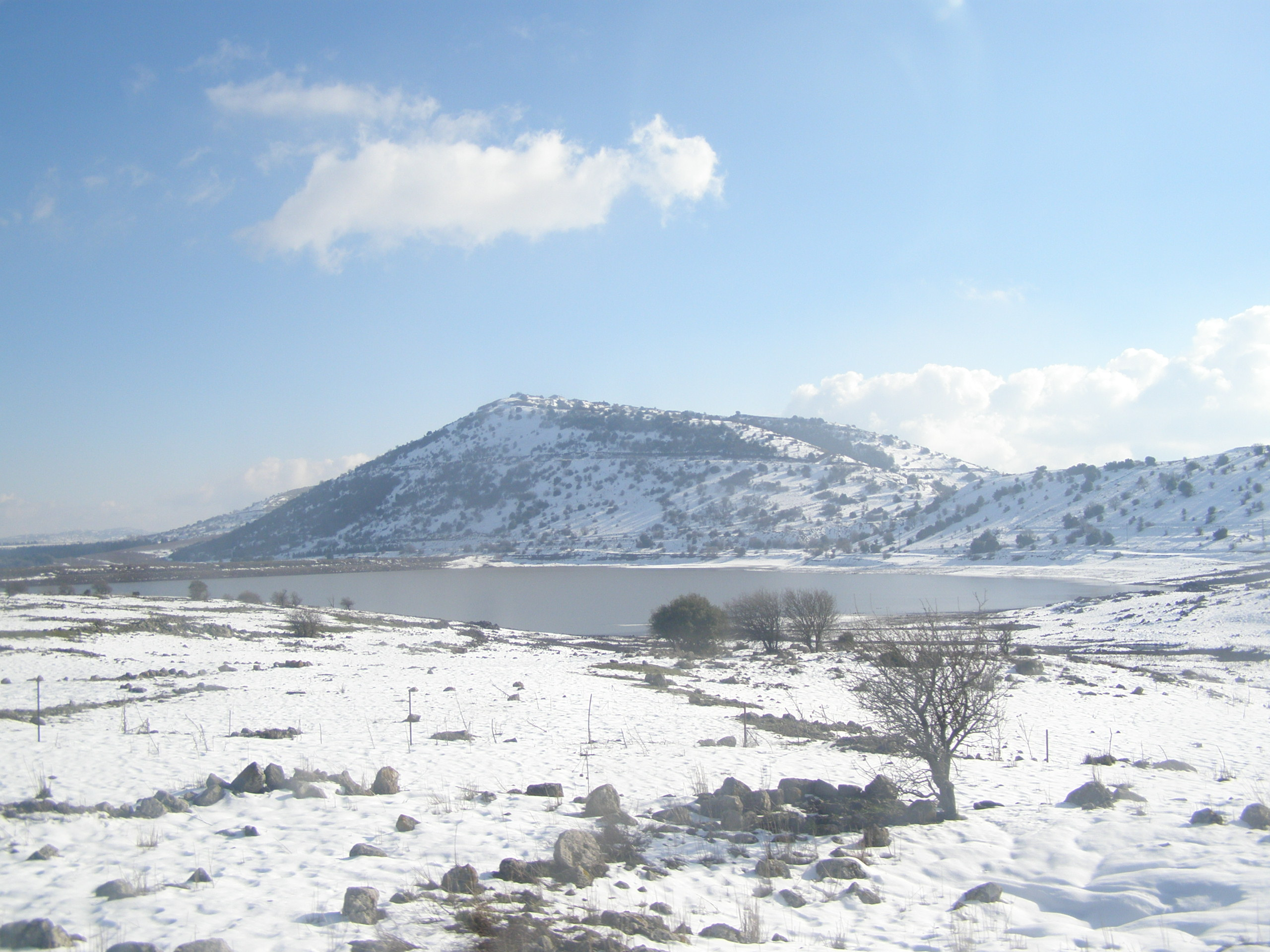
Tel el-Gharam in the Golan Heights

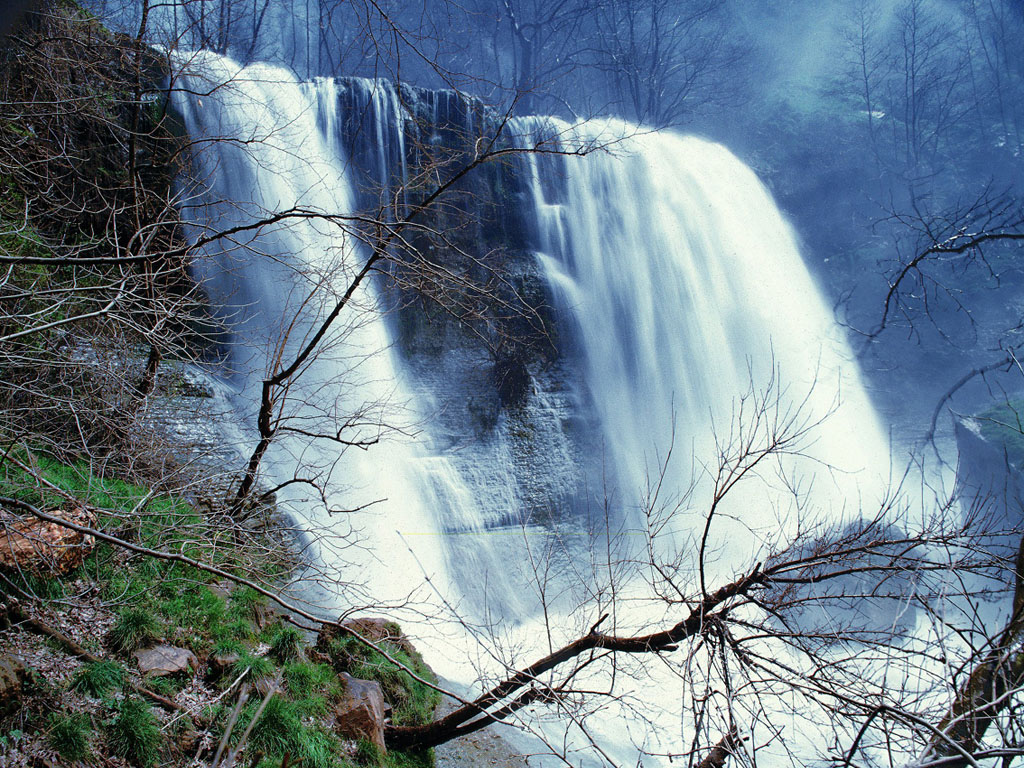
Waterfalls in Batroun, Lebanon

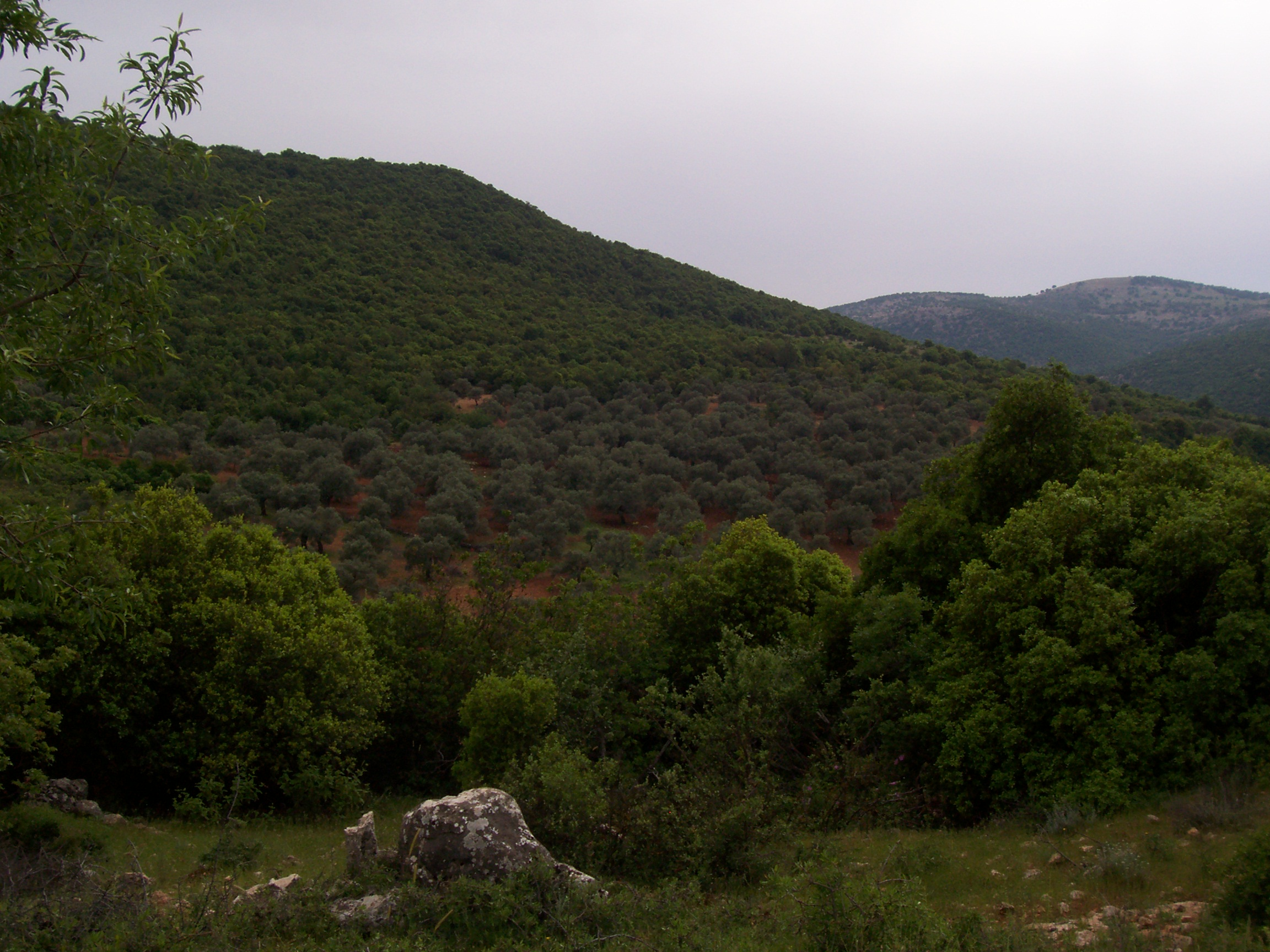
The Ajloun hills, Jordan

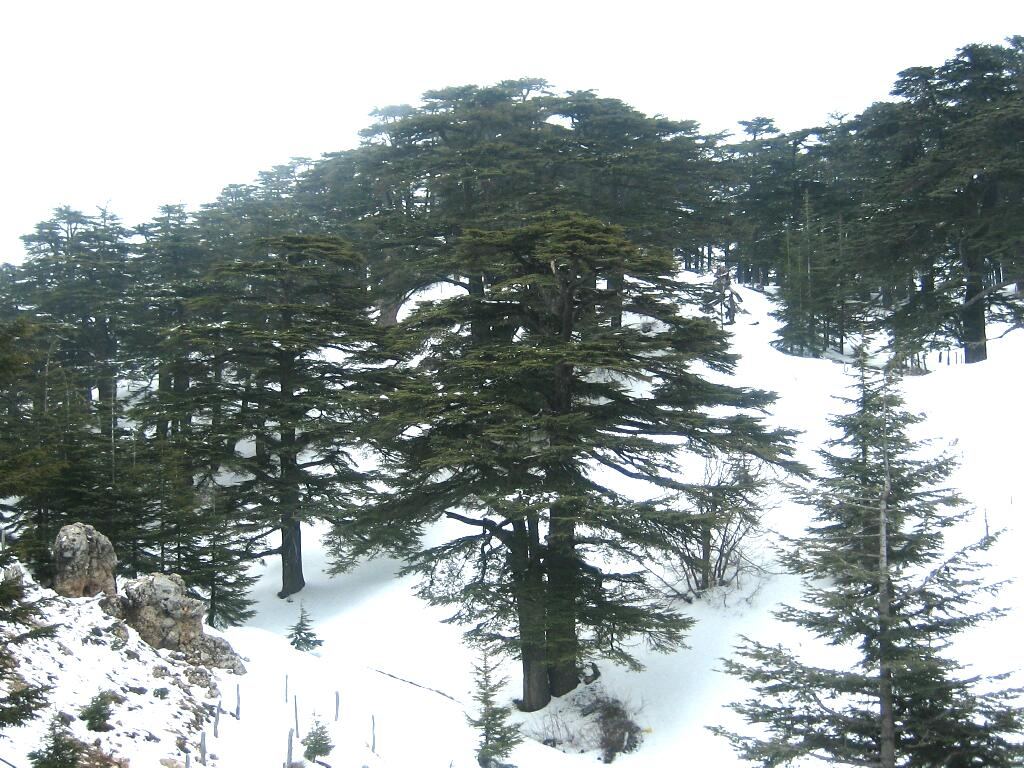
Lebanese cedar in the Lord's Cedar Forest in winter

== Climate and habitat diversity ==
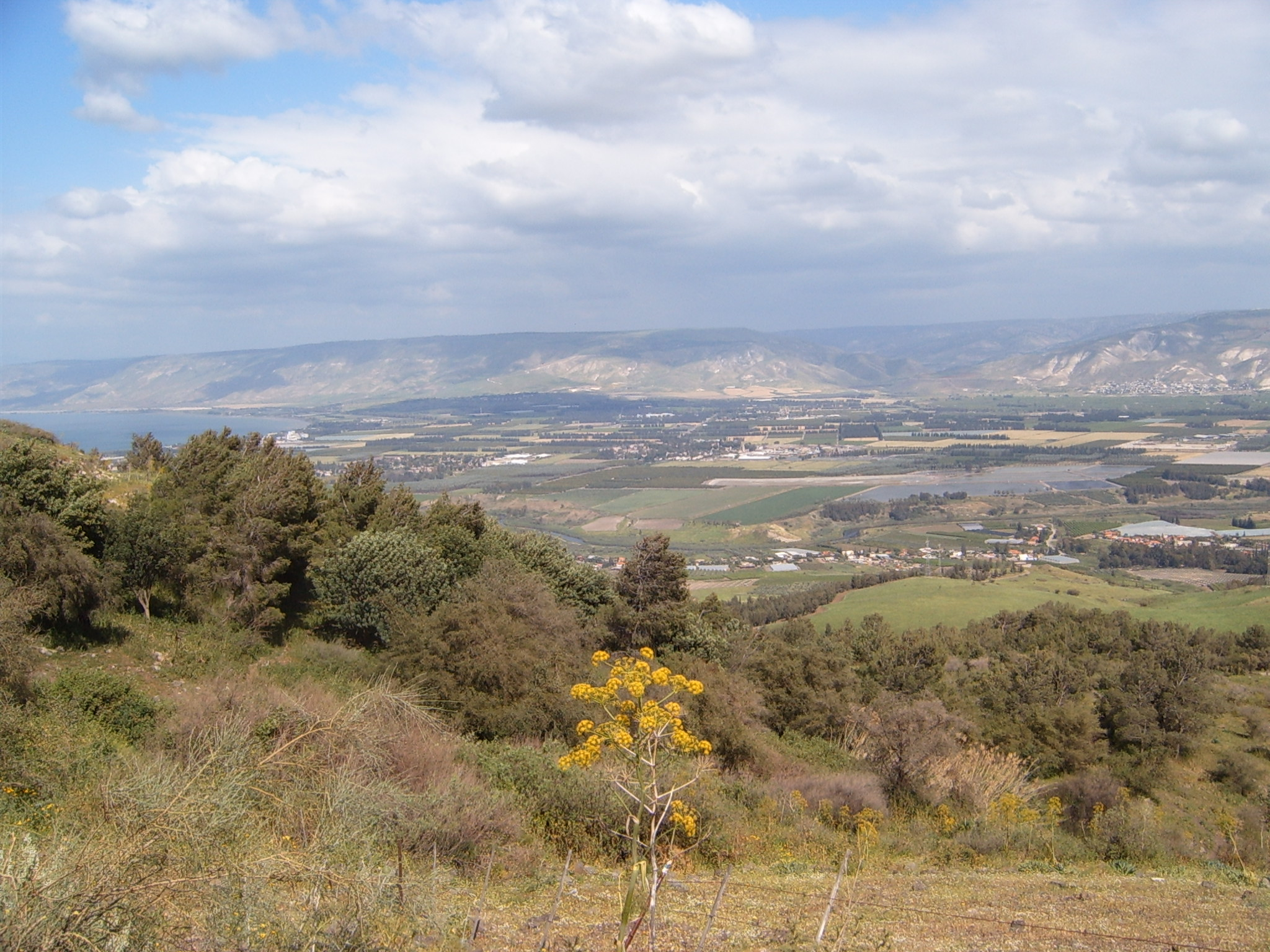
The Jordan Valley and the southern section of Lake Tiberias

The Levant is at the confluence of the three continents that constituted the ancient world. It is a transition zone between the mountainous regions of the Iranian Turanian climate, the Mediterranean Basin, the desert regions of the Arabian Peninsula, and the subtropical climate of Africa and southern Arabia. The distinctive characteristics of this location have influenced the composition of the flora and fauna, with some plant and animal species from the surrounding areas now present.

In addition to the influence of geographical location, the Levant is distinguished by a distinctive topographical and climatic diversity. The region encompasses areas where skiing is possible on Mount Hermon, the western Lebanon mountain range, and the Amanous Mountains. It also includes locations where swimming in the Dead Sea or the Red Sea is feasible on the same day. The climate of the region can be broadly classified into three categories: sub-humid Turanian in the high mountains, Mediterranean in the coastal areas, and arid and desert in the interior, with subtropical conditions prevailing in the Jordan Valley. The climatic and topographical variation observed in the region results in considerable variation in annual precipitation rates. The highest rates, exceeding 1,500 millimeters per year, are observed in the Latakia Mountains, while the lowest rates, below 200 millimeters per year, are observed in the Syrian Desert. Temperature fluctuations are observed, with the highest values occurring during the summer in desert regions and the lowest in mountainous areas and some interior areas. While the Jordan Valley and the coastal plain remain relatively warm in winter, temperatures frequently drop below zero degrees Celsius in the highlands and the interior.

== Vegetation variety ==
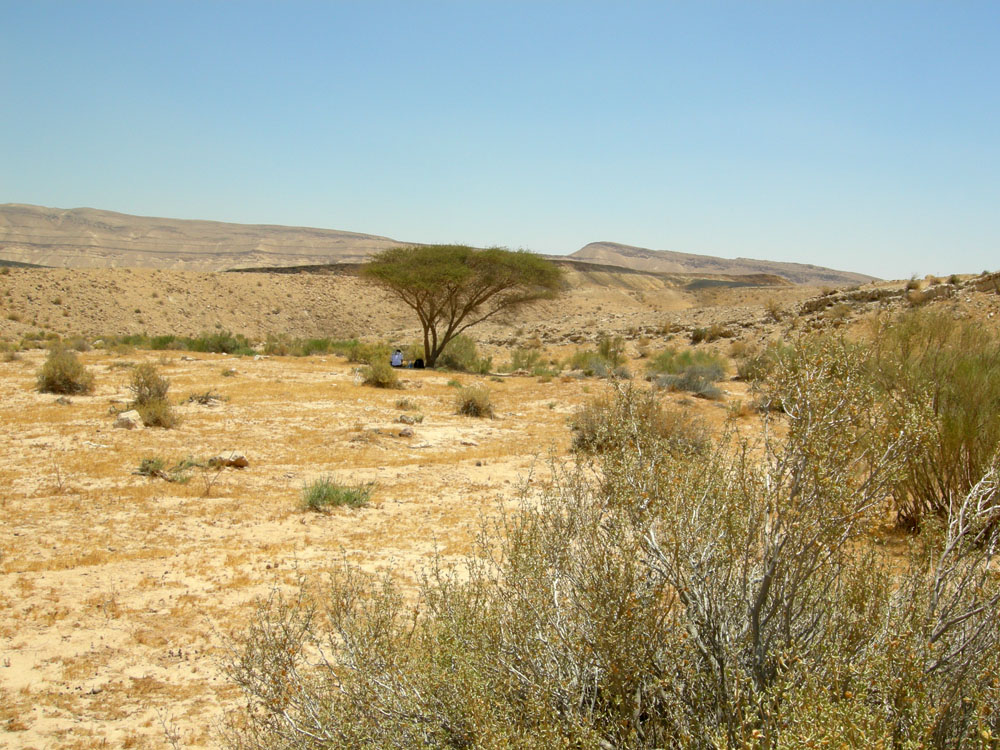
An acacia tree in the Negev

The French botanist Jacques Labillardière published a study of plants from Mount Lebanon, Qalamoun, Damascus, and Cyprus between 1791 and 1812 under the title in Latin Icones plantarum Syriae rariorum. Following this, there were a number of less comprehensive studies until Pierre Edmond Boissier published his celebrated Latin Flora Orientalis in five volumes between 1867 and 1888. This work records the plants he observed during his travels between Aswan and Aleppo.

In 1896, the American botanist George Post published the most comprehensive modern survey of the flora of the Levant, titled Flora of Syria, Palestine and Sinai, which was published by the Syrian Protestant College in Beirut, which later became the American University. In an updated version of this book, published in Beirut in 1932, he recorded approximately 4,200 species from 955 genera and 142 families.

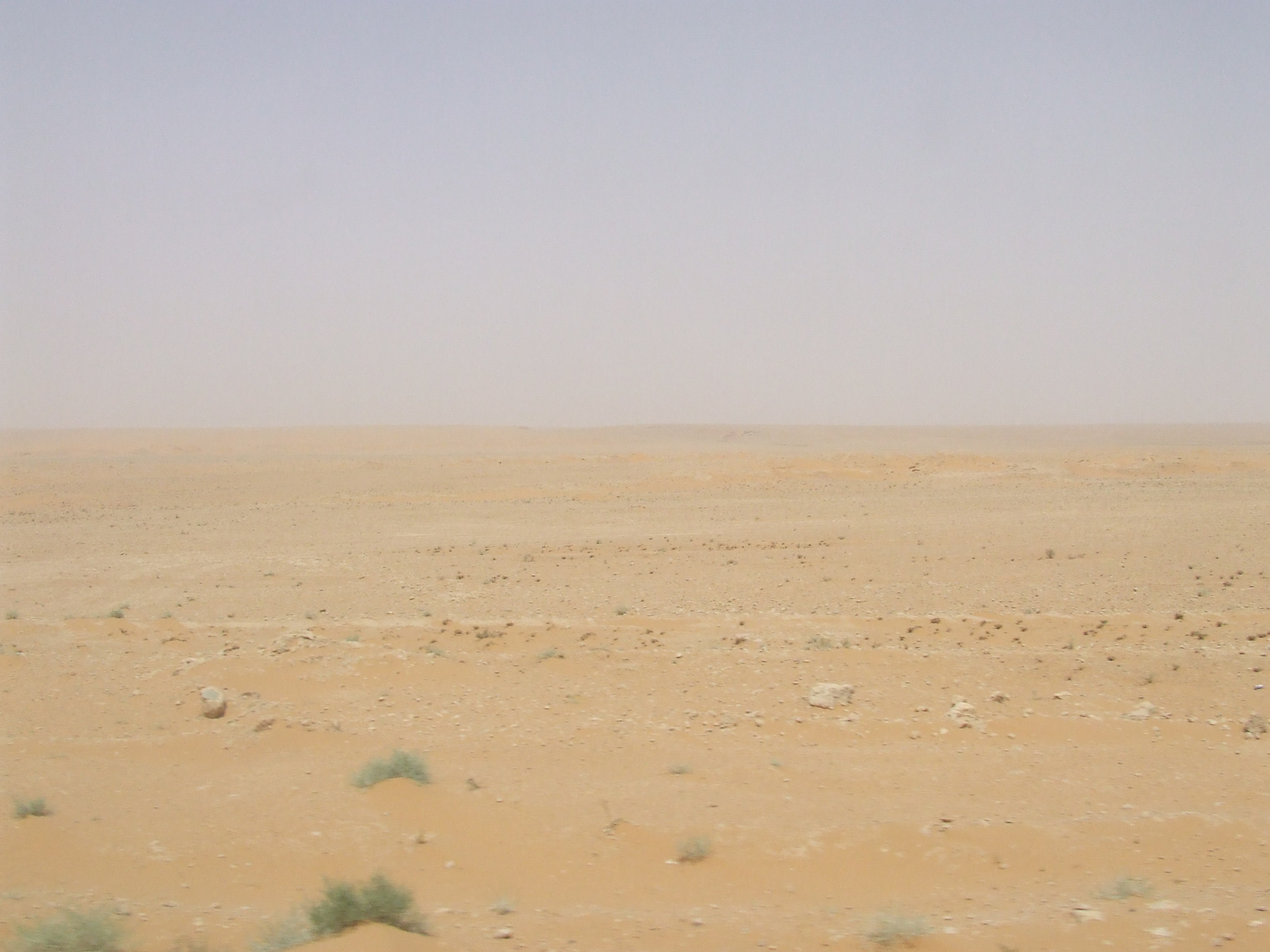
A section of the Badia al-Sham between Deir ez-Zor and Palmyra

In a 1970 study, French botanist Paul Mouterde enumerated 3,459 species in Syria and Lebanon, belonging to 865 genera in 131 families. Of these, approximately 300 species are endemic to Syria and Lebanon and not found elsewhere. In 2006, 900 plant species belonging to 130 families were recorded in Syria. A study conducted by the Ministry of Local Administration has revealed that 3,100 seed-covered plant species, representing 1.4% of the 220,000 known species worldwide, have been documented in Syria. Furthermore, 12 species of gymnosperms were identified. The most significant families are Asteraceae, angiosperms, and legumes. A total of 47 genera and 450 species of legumes are documented in Syria. The cattad is the most diverse species in the Levant, with Post recording 115 species distributed throughout the Levant and Sinai. The distribution of plant ecosystems is influenced by climatic and topographical factors. The following sections present an overview of the most significant climatic zones in the Levant, accompanied by a description of the plant communities that are characteristic of each zone.

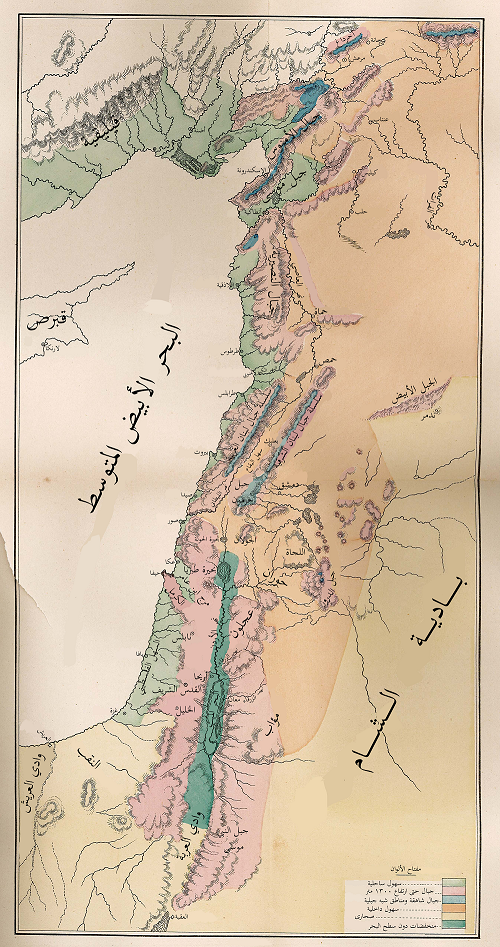
An old map showing the diversity of natural habitats in the Levant and the accompanying diversity of vegetation.

=== Wet bioclimatic floor ===
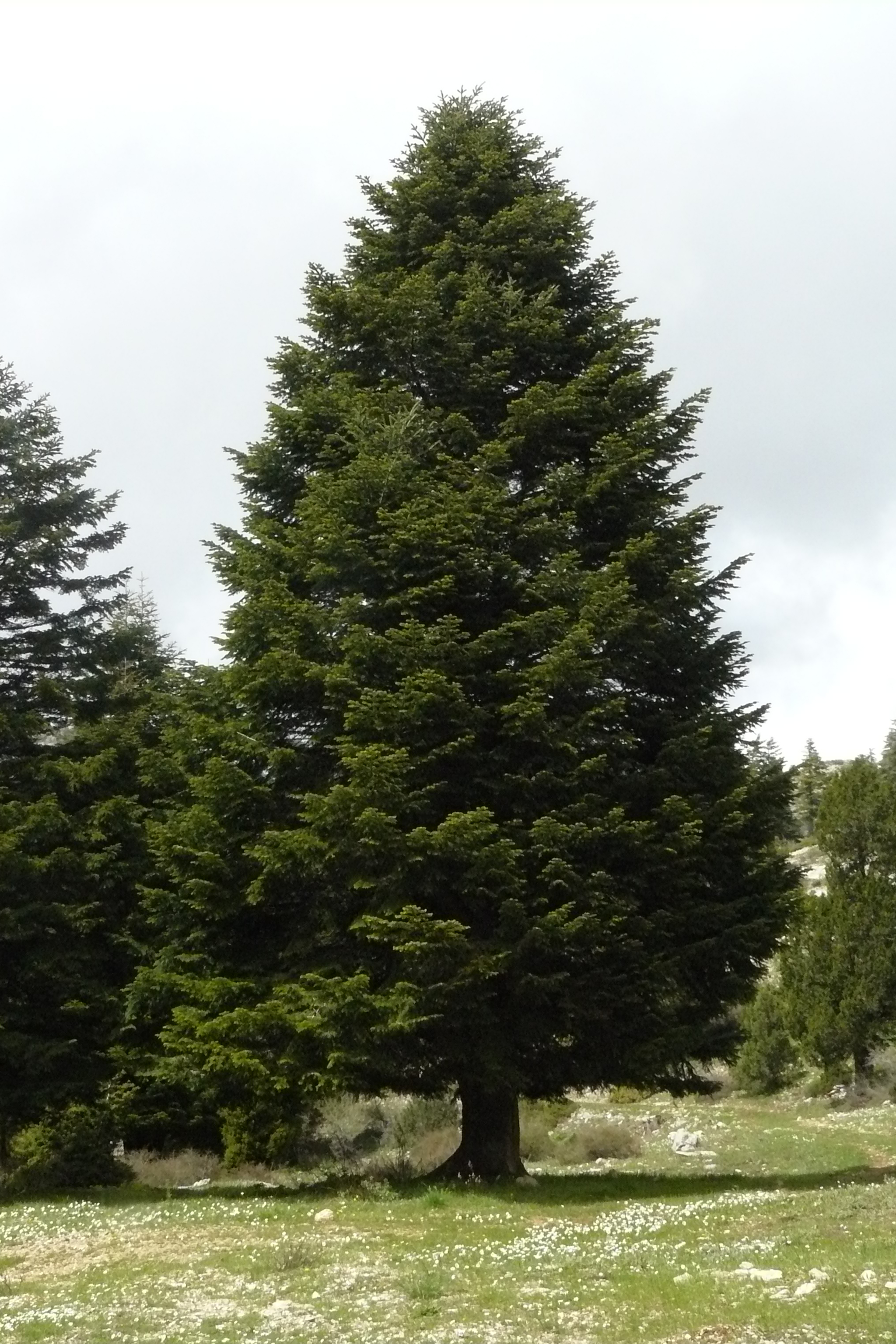
A Syrian shuh tree in northern Lebanon

The humid Iranian-Turanian climate is prevalent in the high regions of the coastal mountains, particularly in the northern and central areas, including Amanous, Nusairiya, and Western Lebanon. This is due to the high rainfall rates and cold temperatures experienced in winter, coupled with moderate temperatures in summer. The high mountains are distinguished by a paucity of species and a high degree of specialization, which is attributed to the cold and strong winds.

The area has three distinct vegetation groups. The first group is the high tree line. The second is the snowy (or alpine) meadows. The third is the semi-alpine or subalpine meadows.

The mountainous regions of this area, situated at elevations of 1800 to 2500 meters above sea level, are home to diverse forests of coniferous species, including the Syrian shuh and Lebanese cedar, which require cold climates for optimal growth. In contrast, lower elevations are characterized by the presence of Aleppo pine (Pinus halepensis) and Brutia pine (Pinus brutia). In this climatic zone, forests comprising broadleaf trees, including the scarlet oak (Quercus coccinea), hairy oak (Quercus cerris), green oak (Quercus ilex), Lebanese oak (Quercus libani), Brantian oak (Quercus brantii), cedar oak (Quercus cedrorum), and thuja oak (Quercus infectoria), are prevalent. Also, oriental oak (Carpinus orientalis), remnants of Mount Tabor oak (Quercus ithaburensis) or Turkey oak (Quercus cerris) and Sorbus torminalis. And, Euphrates poplar (Populus euphratica), weeping willow, white willow, oriental maple, evergreen maple (Acer sempervirens), and Mount Hermon maple (Acer hermoneum), broadleaf maple (Acer obtusifolium) or Syrian (Acer syriacum) and Montpellier maple (Acer monspessulanum), Alnus orientalis, Rhamnus cathartica, broadleaf chewing gum (Euonymus latifolius) Cotoneaster nummularia. Ferns, of which 22 species have been recorded in Syria, are common on the ground floor of these forests.

The second cluster in this climate is the alpine and nival meadows cluster, which is distinguished by sparse vegetation cover, comprising species that are perennial in mountainous locations. A number of species belonging to the Asphodeline genus (Asphodeline taurica) and the Allium genus (Allium makmelianum and garlic butterbur) are distributed across a wide geographical area. Bassia monticola is a species of flowering plant belonging to the Sarmacaceae family. Also, Cerastium cerastoides, and Saponaria pulvinars of the clove family, Ranunculus demissus, buttercup (Ranunculus chionophiles), mouse-tail buttercup (Ranunculus myosuroides), and Lebanese poppy (Papaver libanoticum), Draba, Alyssum of the cruciferous family, Pisum formium, and lentil chickpeas (Cicer ervoides), Astragalus of the legume family, hornwort and several species of citronella, fleshy flax (Linum carnulosum), Euphorbia caudiculosa, and Lebanese violets (Viola libanotica). Also, Veronica bombycina, tufted fringe flower (Veronica caespitosa). Crocus species, including Crocus hermoneus and Crocus kotschyanus are also widely distributed.

The subalpine or subalpine meadow group encompasses pillow shaped plants such as the Bethlehem caterpillar (Astragalus bethlehiticus). Also, Hermonian astragalus (Astragalus hermonis), Noaea mucronata, and Lebanese gumball (Acantholimon libanoticum). Species of hibiscus (Ononis) and ambergris (Pandanus, long-thorned, velvet, and tamarisk).

To preserve the region's flora, several reserves have been established. These include the Shuh and Cedar Reserve in Slinfah, the Chouf Cedar Nature Reserve, and the Farnalq Reserve. It has been demonstrated that plants that were previously considered to be absent from the Levant have now been identified in the Shuh and Cedars Reserve. These include the glossy-backed or ornamental lavender (Ruscus hypoglossum), a herbaceous perennial. This serves to illustrate the significance of reserves in the conservation of wildlife.

=== Sub-humid bioclimatic floor ===
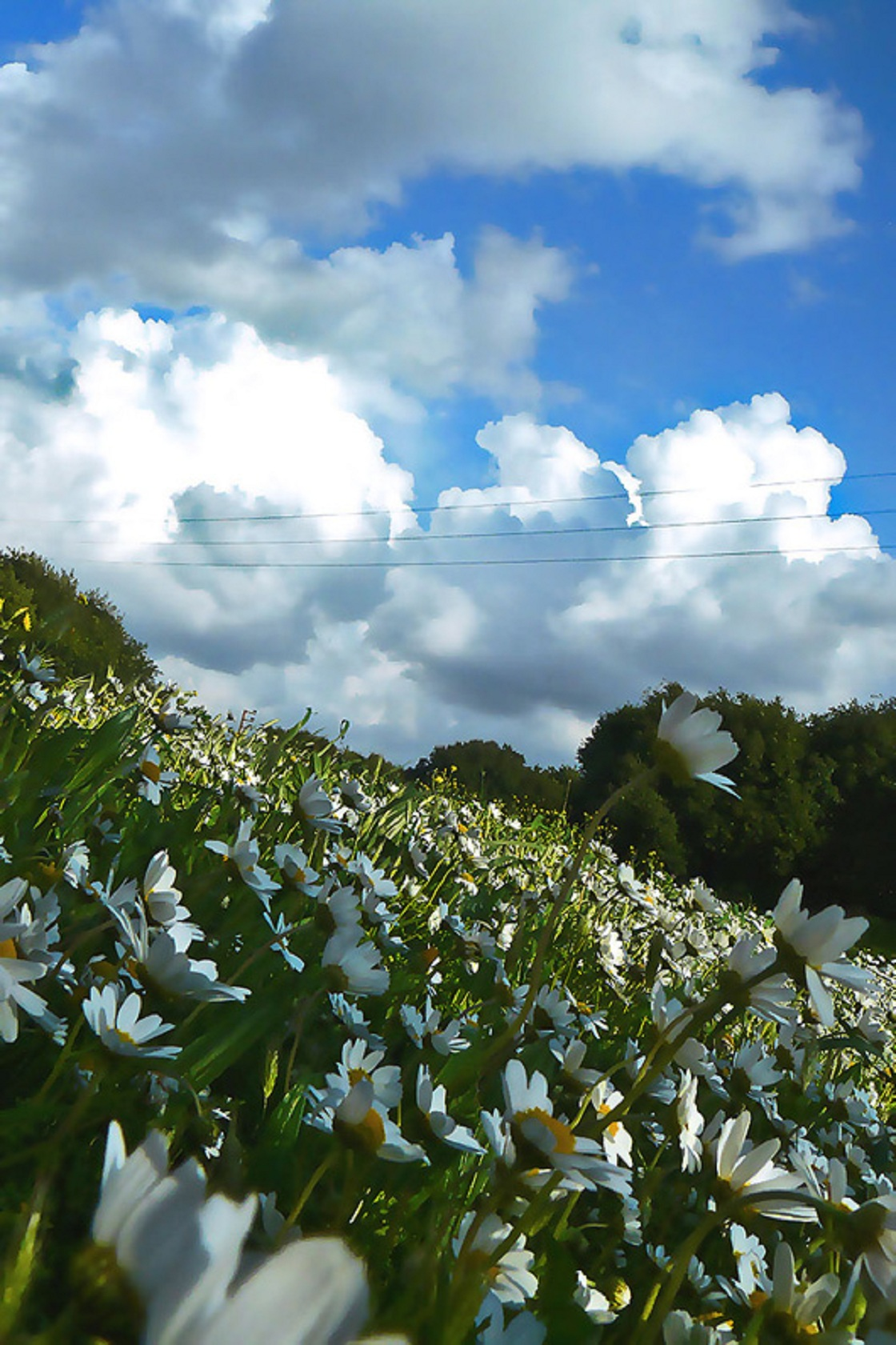
A field of white flowers in Mount Lebanon

This climatic level is found in mid-altitude coastal mountain regions (above 800 meters above sea level) and inland mountains above 900 meters above sea level. This region is situated to the east and south of the area mentioned above. It encompasses the majority of the central mountains of Syria, including Mount Aleppo (Afrin), Mount Zawiya, and portions of Lebanon's eastern mountains. Additionally, it includes the peaks of southern Lebanon, the Galilee Mountains, Mount Ajloun, the Nablus Mountains, and the Hebron Mountains.

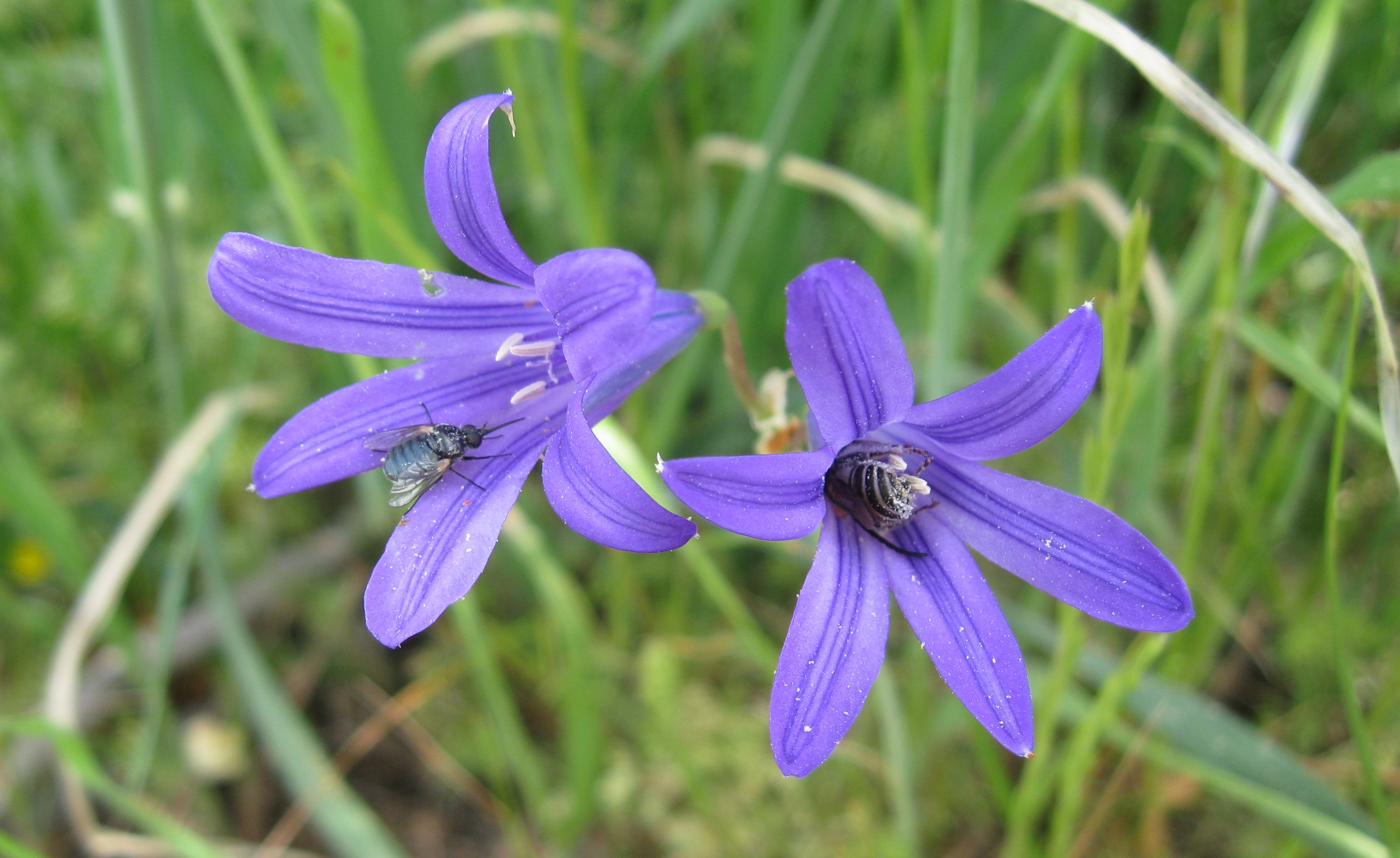
Ixiolirion tataricum in the Hebron Mountains

The climate of these mountains is less humid than that of the high peaks of the coastal mountains. This is due to the lower humidity levels in the atmosphere, which in turn affects the density of the vegetation. The vegetation representative of the Mediterranean Basin is less dense in these mountains than in the coastal mountains due to the lack of humidity. Most of the forest area in these regions consists of Brutia pine. In addition to this species, other cone species may be present, including Aleppo pine and Mediterranean cypress (Cupressus sempervirens). Several species of juniper (Juniperus excelsa) may also be present such as Cade juniper (Juniperus oxycedrus), Syrian juniper (Juniperus drupacea) and stinking juniper (Juniperus foetidissima). Broadleaf species including carob, elderberry, terebinth (Pistacia palaestina), and Atlantic (Pistacia atlantica) are present. Additionally, the Atlantic terebinth (Pistacia terebinthus), the mastic (Pistacia lentiscus), the kermes or Palestinian oak (Quercus coccifera), gray myrtle, Syrian myrtle (Fraxinus syriaca), wild olive, hawthorn species (Crataegus) and Syrian pear (Pyrus syriaca), primrose jasmine (Jasminium nummularia), and Palestinian buckthorn (Rhamnus palaestina). Types of wild almonds can be found, including Levantine, Arabic, korshinskyi (Prunus korshinskyi), common and mahleb (Prunus mahaleb) almonds. Also, myrtle, eiderdown, and cranberry varieties can be found. Shrubs like bear peach, Jabal al-Sheikh maple (Acer hermoneum) and Cotoneaster nummularius are also present. Broadleaf buttonwood (Phillyrea latifolia) and Greek strawberry tree (Arbutus andrachne) are also present. High up in these mountains are some perennial species of Onobrychis (mountain, long-spined, Kochi, and Pendosi). The foothills of these mountains are also populated by a multitude of annual and perennial herbaceous plants belonging to various families, including leguminous, vetiver, asteraceous, buttercup, papaveraceae, and Iridaceae. The most prevalent legume species in the Levant (across diverse habitats) include the following: shamrock (more than sixty species), qatad (approximately forty-five species), alfasa (more than forty species), vetch (more than forty species), and anabris (approximately twenty species). A minimum of 18 species of monocotyledons have been identified in the mountains of the Levant.

In these regions, the advent of agricultural systems is observed. Olive groves, almond groves, vineyards, and fig trees are among the most common agricultural products found in this region. One of the nature reserves located in this region is the Al-Lathab Reserve.

=== Coastal plains and hills with a Mediterranean climate ===
These areas share much of the vegetation of the previous region. In the hilly areas is the Mediterranean forest consisting of one or both types of pine, in addition to other species such as carob. The proportion of shrubs, perennial herbs and annuals increases in this region. The herbaceous species include lupine, civet and vetch.

=== Mediterranean to semi-arid inland steppes and plains ===
These areas include the Fertile Crescent, which stretches from northern Iraq and Upper Mesopotamia to the plains of Aleppo, Hama, the Hauran Plain, and the Besan Plain.

On the northern (Upper Mesopotamia and the foothills of the Taurus Mountains) and western margins of these regions (on the western slopes of the mountains), degraded steppe forests are found, comprising Atlantic ducks, hawthorn species, wild almond species, grasses, and legumes. In the plains of the Mesopotamia, plants characteristic of the semi-desert climate are found, including acacia, and artemisia, as well as perennial herbaceous plants such as tamarix, capers, Salsola, and cattails.

In these regions, grain farming is prevalent where groundwater or irrigation canals are absent, such as the Euphrates Plains and eastern Aleppo.

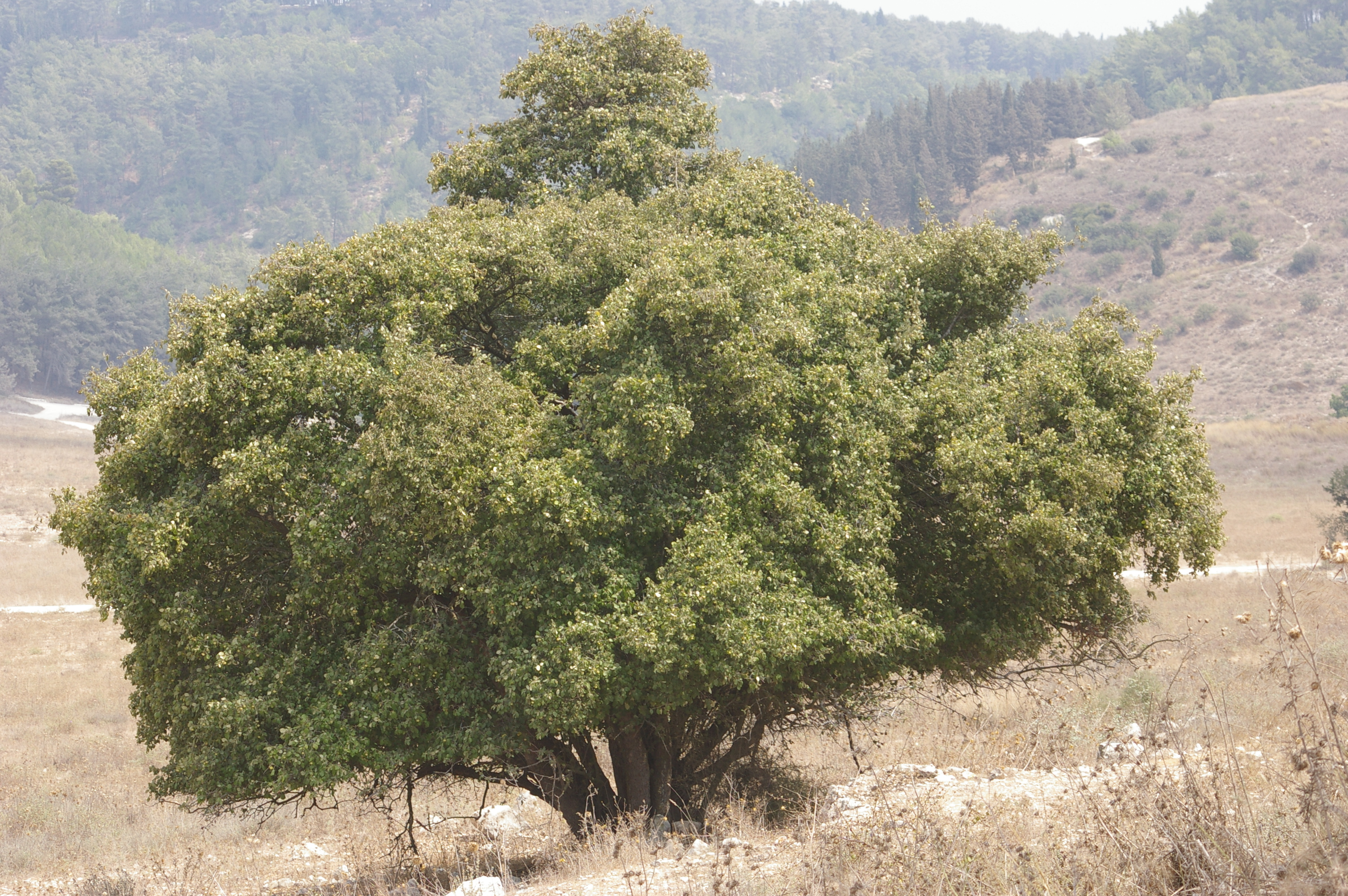
Styrax officinalis on the outskirts of a forest in the Lower Galilee

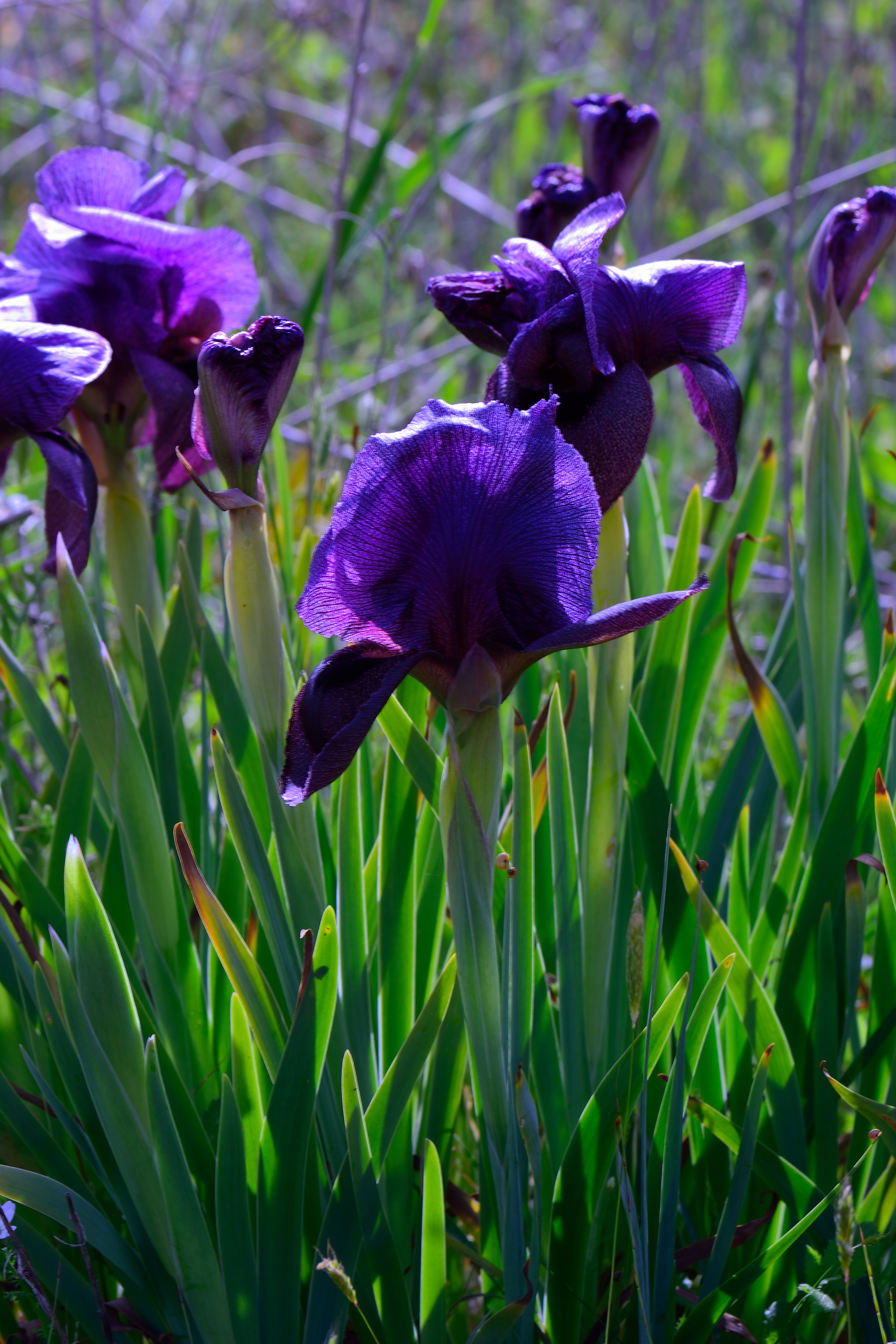
Iris

=== Rivers and inland waterways ===
On the banks of the Euphrates, Khabur, Jordan, and the river islands, there are vestiges of moisture-loving forests comprising Euphrates poplar, white willow, and thistle. The lower course of the Jordan River is characterized by saline vegetation, similar to that found in sabkhat areas, as a result of the salinization of the river water and the surrounding land in this section. The most notable species is the large-fruited thistle.

In areas characterized by swamps and freshwater streams, trees and shrubs such as the Syrian maran also known as the Syrian elm (Fraxinus syriaca), eucalyptus, and the giant juniper (Arundo donax) are observed to flourish.

=== Sabkhas areas and lakes ===
The interior of the region is characterized by the presence of sabkhas (saltwater marshes) and waterways. Additionally, there are several freshwater lakes. The plant life in these lakes is distinctive, particularly given that they are typically situated in arid surroundings. An example of a marsh is Sabkhat al-Jabbul in eastern Aleppo. This sabkha receives its water from winter floods and, more recently, summer agricultural drainage from the irrigated as-Safira plains. İskenderun encompasses several geographical features, including lakes such as Tiberias, Lake Khatuniyah, and Qattinah, as well as swampy areas such as Houla, Azraq, and Lake Amik.

Fifty or more species of halophytes are found in Sabkhat al-Jabbul, on its shores and the islands within it. This represents the largest number of species of any Syrian sabkha. The majority of these species are herbaceous, while a few are shrubby. Initial in situ studies have identified previously unrecorded species within the Syrian flora, including Arthrocnemum fruticosum and Halopeplis perfoliata. The lake's shoreline is lined with short fescue (Aeluropus lagopoides) and large-fruited fescue (Tamarix macrocarpa) bushes. Additionally, a dense jungle of giant plants surrounds the lake.

The vegetation on the edges of the sabkhas provide food for migratory and endemic birds.

=== Semi-arid climate in the eastern mountains ===
The aforementioned areas encompass Mount Abdulaziz, Mount Abu Rajman, Mount al-Hass, Jabal Shabith, the Palmyrene Mountains, and portions of the foothills surrounding the Jordan Valley.

The region in question exhibits a paucity of plant life when compared to coastal areas, a phenomenon that can be attributed to the region's lack of rainfall and the degradation of its soil. A total of 407 plant species belonging to 47 families and 210 genera have been recorded in Mount Abdulaziz. In the vicinity of the Aleppo Desert, the number of species is 235, belonging to 41 families and 132 genera, as observed in the Hass and Shebith mountains.

The aforementioned areas are primarily composed of annuals, some shrubs, and perennials to a lesser extent. Additionally, shrubs and perennials are present in smaller quantities. The area is sparsely populated by trees and shrubs, including Pistacia atlantica and Pistacia khinjuk, wild almonds, wild figs, hawthorn, and pig carob. The eastern mountains is the only place in the Levant where the Pistacia khinjuk, which extends across Turkey, the Caucasus, and Central Asia, is observed. Additionally, there are flora with potential for pastoral use, such as Salsola, Atriplex, Noaea, Haliyan, Peganum, Salmas, and Hanita. A number of medicinal plants native to these mountains and the surrounding region have been identified, including wild thyme, daja, catnip, wormwood, and capers. Beautiful wildflowers and plants such as anemones, buttercups, violets, roemeria, and Ixiolirion also grow.

=== Badia al-Sham and oasis areas ===
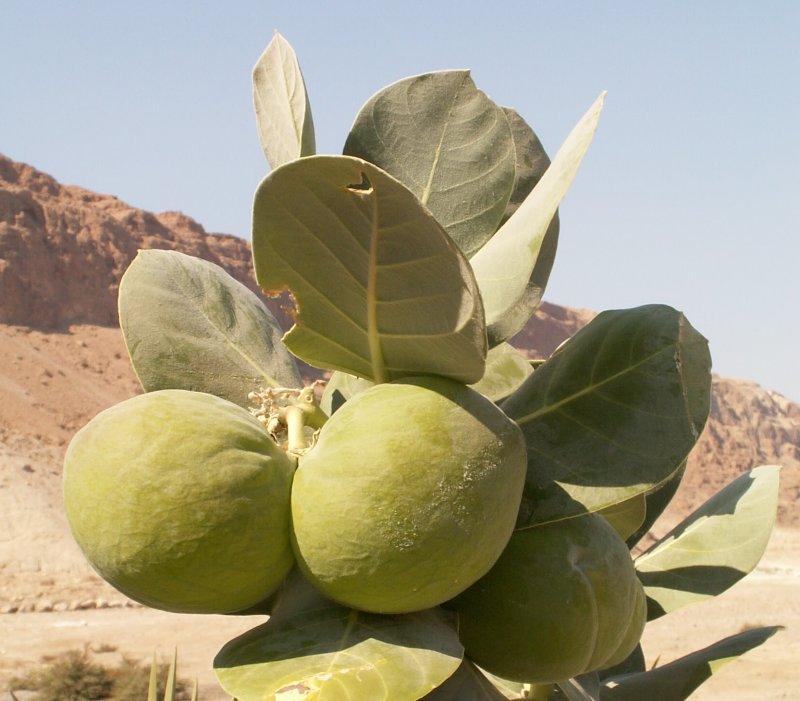
The Negev's ashkhar or "Dead Sea apple", Calotropis procera

The region is characterized by annual or perennial herbaceous plants and small drought-tolerant shrubs, with an annual rainfall of less than 200 millimeters. The flora of this environment includes a number of herbaceous plant genera, including Achillea with several species, Anthemis, Astragalus, Ducrosia, Citrullus colocynthis, Aizoon, Ephedra, Bromus, Kamash (Andrachne), Alhagi, and Ixiolirion. The plant life of the flanks is diverse, encompassing numerous genera, including Atriplex, Hammada, Haloxylon, Anabasis, Artemisia, Noaea, Peganum, and Calligonum.

=== Areas in the Jordan Valley and Negev ===
Annual and perennial herbaceous species inhabit these environments. A diverse array of bulbous and tuberous species exists, including the clove and Bellevalia of the asparagus family and the asafoetida of the Xanthorrhoea genus. A diverse range of Boerhavia and Commicarpus species can be found within the alum (Nyctaginaceae) family. The Jordan Valley, extending from Lake Hula to the southern Dead Sea, is distinguished by a subtropical climate and a low frost incidence, which facilitate the growth of tropical and subtropical plants. The introduction of plants such as palms, bananas, and citrus has been observed. Examples of wild plants in these areas include the giant jungle, which is found in areas of watercourses and valleys. The Negev region is distinguished by certain species representing an African vegetation extension. These species include the gallant titan (Calotropis procera) and four species of acacia, one of which is the twisted acacia (Vachellia tortilis).

Numerous plant species are found in most Levantine environments. Among these is the iris, which comprises more than thirty species in the Levant. At least fifty species of the genus Allium and forty species of Centaurea are commonly found in the Levant, extending from Kahramanmaraş to Sinai. In addition, the clove family includes more than sixty species of the genus Silene, which are distributed across various regions. The Asteraceae family, on the other hand, comprises thirty-seven species of Anthemis.

== Vegetation erosion ==
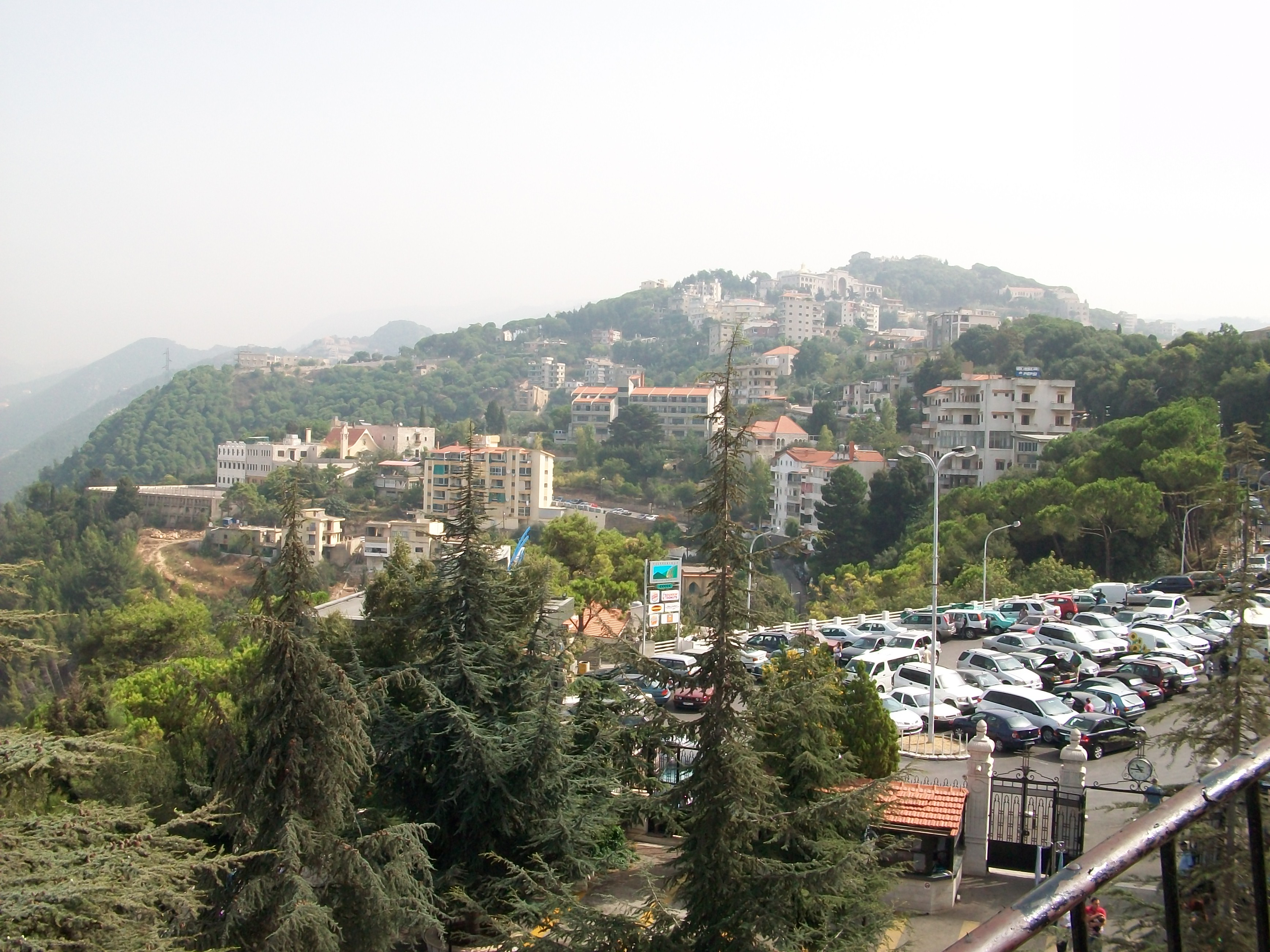
Urban sprawl in forested areas, as is the case here in Harissa-Daraoun.

The Levant is experiencing a decline in vegetation due to a multitude of human and natural factors. At the conclusion of the Ottoman era in the Levant, extensive tracts of forests, hillside forests, and mountain foothills were felled to provide timber for railroad construction and to fuel steam trains, particularly in the southern and interior regions due to the construction of the Hejaz railway and the outbreak of World War I. The resulting deforestation led to soil erosion and the disappearance of numerous plant species.

The plant biodiversity of the Levant is being degraded, which could lead to the extinction of some plant species. One of the indicators used to signify the risk of extinction is the ratio of the number of species to the number of genera. The ratio of species to genera in Palestine was 3.3, in Syria and Lebanon it was 3.8, in Jordan it was 3.6, and in Egypt it was 2.2. A study published in 2011 by environmental organizations revealed that the primary threats to wild plants are urbanization, firewood collection, tourism, intensification of farming, and unsustainable harvesting. In Syria and Palestine, the unsustainable collection of medicinal and aromatic herbs for sale affects 91% of important plant areas.

The wildlife of Palestine and the Golan has been adversely affected by the consequences of the Israeli occupation, in addition to the actions of farmers, shepherds, and tourists. A significant number of Israeli settlements have been constructed in forested and wooded areas, including Eli, Ariel, Qadumim, Alon Moreh, and Bracha in Nablus, Jabal Abu Ghneim in Bethlehem, Matisyahu and Kiryat Sefer, and the majority of settlements in the Golan Heights. A total of 78% of the loss of forest land in the West Bank can be attributed to the activities of settlements. Furthermore, Israel has been exploiting natural areas for tourism, which has had a detrimental impact on the environment. For example, in the Ein al-Fashkha area on the shore of the Dead Sea, trees were cleared, leaving only one acacia tree, and the area of Salvadora persica trees was reduced to only 3 dunams.

The Levant is home to 226 site-limited plant species, distributed across an area of less than 100 km^{2}. Additionally, 183 range-limited species are present, with their distribution confined to an area of less than 5000 km^{2}. Furthermore, 23 threatened species have no defined range.

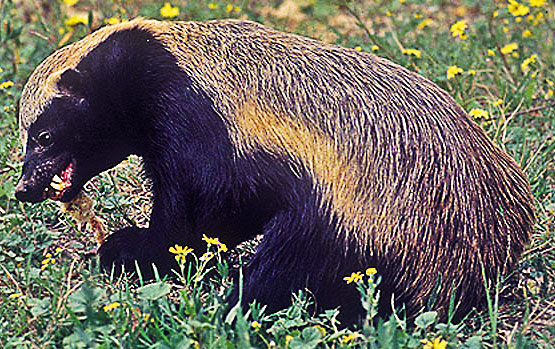
Ratel or honey badger

Nevertheless other sources indicate that a considerably greater number of species are included on the list of threatened plants. For instance, the Biodiversity Research Center in Nablus has published a red list of endangered plants in the West Bank and Gaza Strip. The list has 334 plant species from 222 genera belonging to 81 families. The list includes a number of significant plant species, including wild almonds, figs, hawthorn, willow, poplar, sedr and arak, as well as Syrian pear and Syrian maran.

== Mammals ==
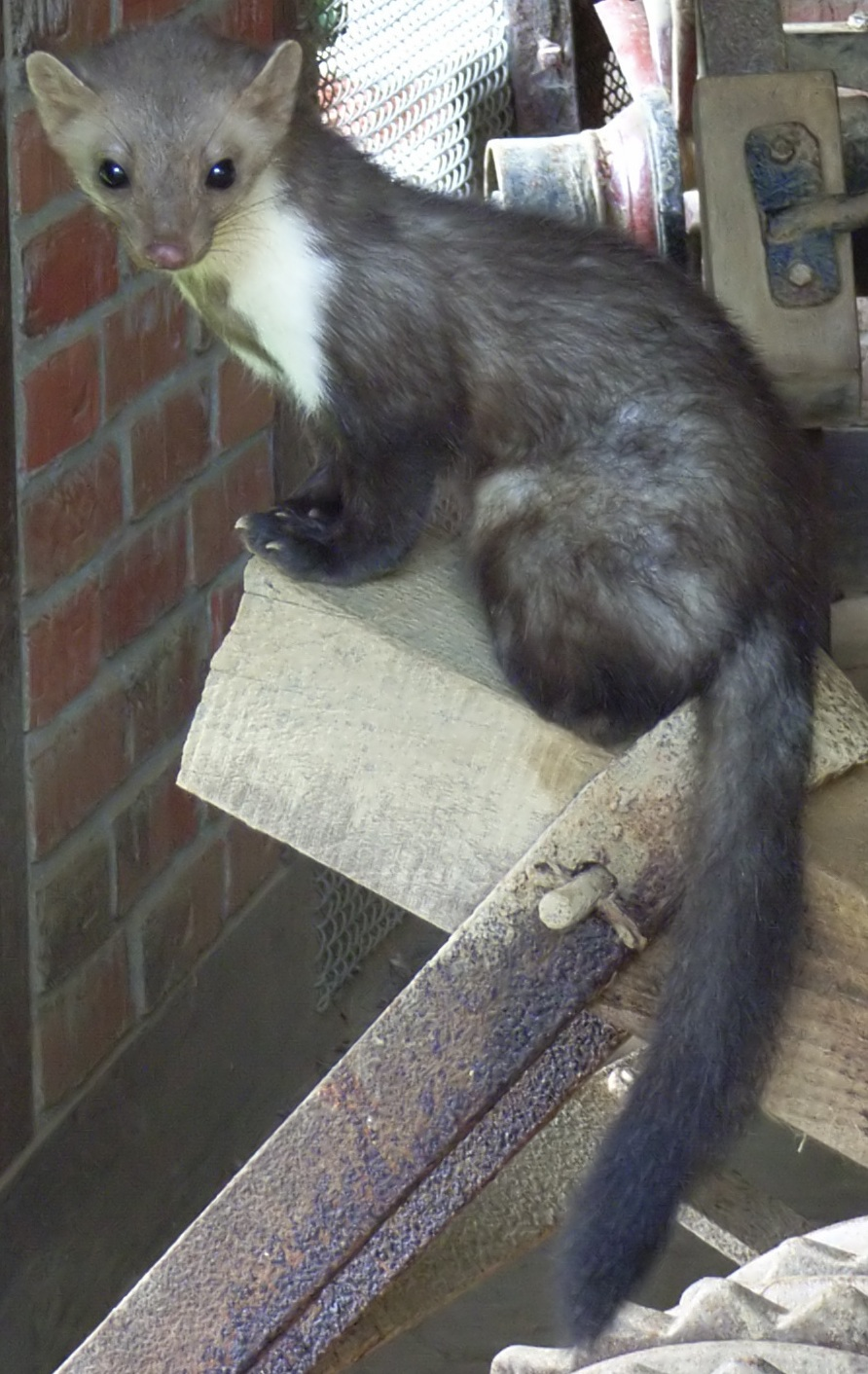
Beech marten

The Levant's location at the center of the three continents of the ancient world has served for millions of years as a natural crossing point for mammals migrating south from Europe and north from Africa. These species met in the Levant and colonized their diverse natural habitats, some of which have evolved over time into breeds unique to this region. Many large Levantine mammals became extinct, for unnatural reasons in most cases, mainly hunting and destruction of habitats to reclaim fertile lands, while other species became extinct for natural reasons in prehistoric times, mainly climate change, and their fossils have been found in various places in the Levant. Humans introduced a few species of mammals to the region, sometimes intentionally, sometimes unknowingly, and released them into the wild. Today, the number of mammal species in Lebanon is 57, in Syria 71, in Jordan 70, and in Israel and the Palestinian territories 96, which means that the Levant's mammal diversity is comparable to that of Europe. Additionally, certain domesticated mammal breeds are endemic to the Levant. Of these, the Awassi sheep is particularly noteworthy, having its origins in the Levantine wilderness. Similarly, the Damascene goat and the Asafi sheep, a hybrid of the local Awassi and the European East Frisian, are also indigenous.

=== Carnivores ===
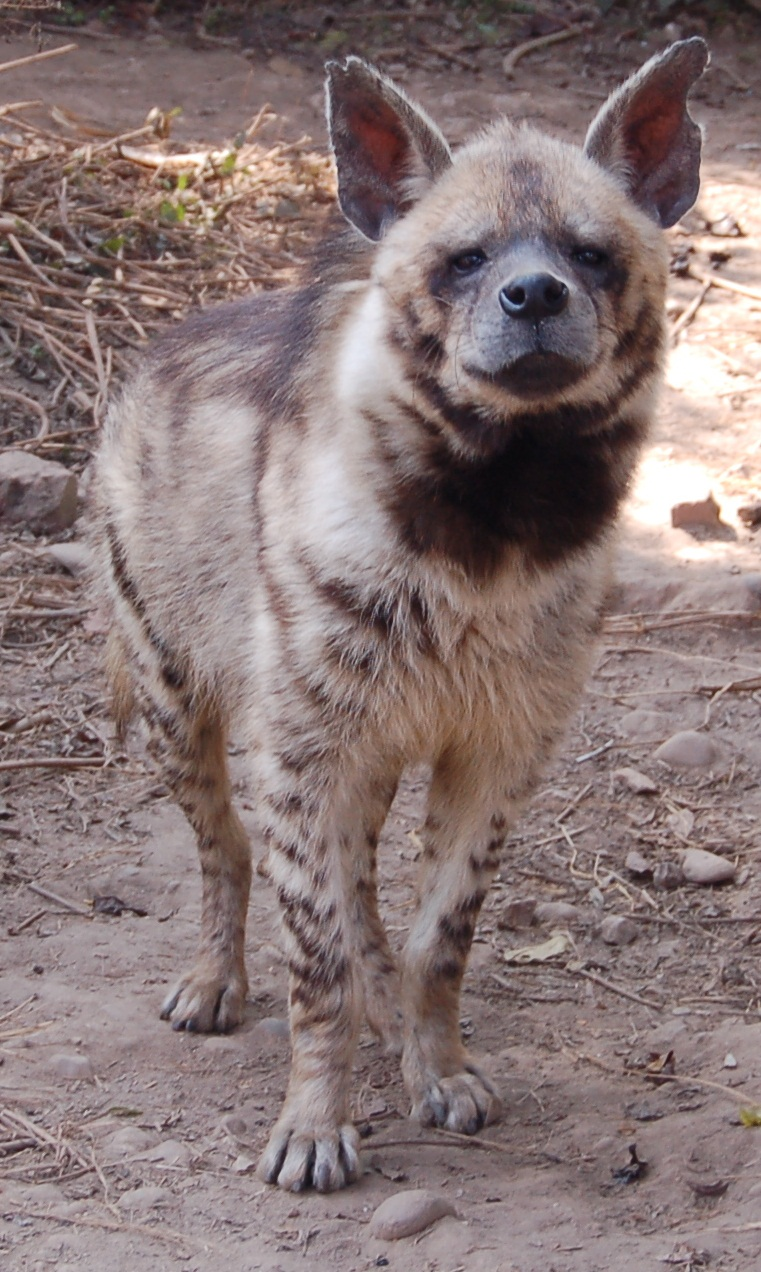
Striped hyena

In the Levant, the carnivores are represented by six families: Mustelidae (mustelids), Herpestidae (mongooses), Hyaenidae (hyenas), Canidae (canids or dogs), Phocidae (earless seals) and Felidae (felid or cats). The marten still inhabits the protected virgin areas of the Levant, some in close proximity to villages, towns, and farms. Its habit of feasting on poultry and cultivated fruits and vegetables has caused it much trouble with farmers, and its valuable fur has led to it being persecuted and hunted in many areas. Another familiar Levantine Mustelidae, the veined weasel or veined horse-mouse, is still common, especially in the highlands and mountains, and to a lesser extent in the coastal plain of Palestine, and is the most common Levantine sable. Poultry farmers view them with disdain due to their sporadic thefts, whereas farmers regard them as beneficial as they consume rodents that otherwise would destroy crops. The Eurasian otter is widely distributed throughout Levantine canals and waterways, particularly those that are not heavily polluted. Some of the most notable locations where they can still be observed include Swamp Amik in Lebanon, Lake Hula in Israel, Lake Qaraoun, Orontes River, Zarqa River, and the Jordan River. They are the largest freshwater mammals in the region. The most conspicuous species in the Levant are the lesser weasel, the Eurasian badger, and the honey badger or skunk. The first species colonizes forests, meadows, and areas adjacent to villages, and its presence is beneficial as it kills mice. The second species is common in open deciduous forests and some coastal areas, while the third species is mainly a desert animals which can are found in the south Levant from the Negev Desert to Jerusalem and surrounding areas. They are known to exhibit a ferocity that allows them to kill even the most venomous snakes and to resist attacks by larger predators.

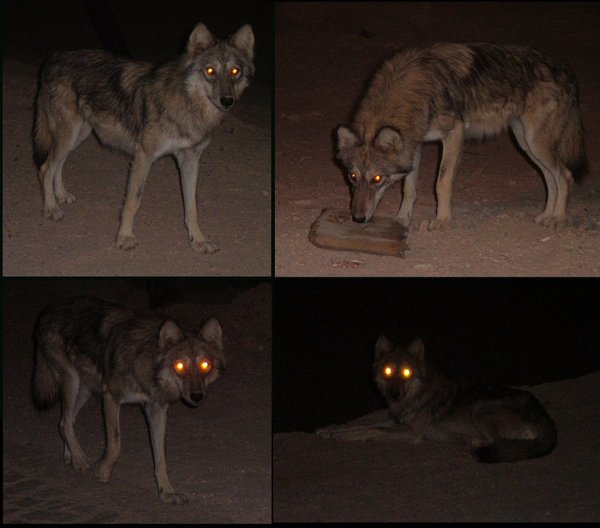
An Arabian wolf in its winter coat in the southern Arabah Valley

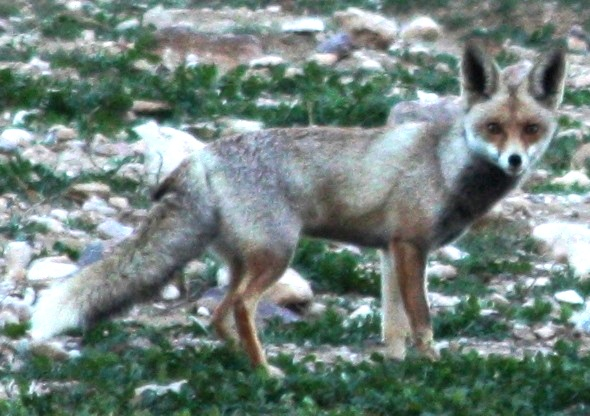
An Arabian red fox in Jordan

A single species of mongoose, the Egyptian mongoose, is endemic to the Levant. This species is known to transmit visceral leishmaniasis. The habitat of these mongooses extends from South Africa through the Levant to Turkey, and has been introduced to Italy and Madagascar. They are most commonly found in forests, scrubland, and hedgerows in close proximity to a permanent source of water. The status of these animals in the Levant is analogous to that of mustelidae, which are despised by poultry farmers but appreciated by farmers for their ability to kill mice and rats. As with the mongoose family, the hyena family is currently represented by only one species in the Levant, the striped hyena. This species is the largest surviving predator in Lebanon and Syria. Furthermore, the Levant hyenas are considered the largest striped hyenas in the world. The coloration of their manes distinguishes them from other packs. Rather than being entirely black, as are hyenas in Africa and India, their manes exhibit a mixture of black and gray. Levantine striped hyenas are known to consume significant quantities of human feces. They rely on the carcasses of wild and domesticated animals for a significant portion of their sustenance. Some scientists have proposed that they are capable of hunting and killing larger prey, although this hypothesis has yet to be empirically verified. During the early settlement of Palestine by Jewish farmers, the striped hyena was a frequent target of organized poisoning campaigns. Currently, the animals are legally protected in Israel and hunting is prohibited. But the small size of the natural reserves they inhabit poses a threat to inbreeding. In Jordan, the hunting of animals remains a common practice, with most villagers viewing them as a potential threat to themselves and their livestock, a sentiment that is also prevalent in Lebanon and Syria.

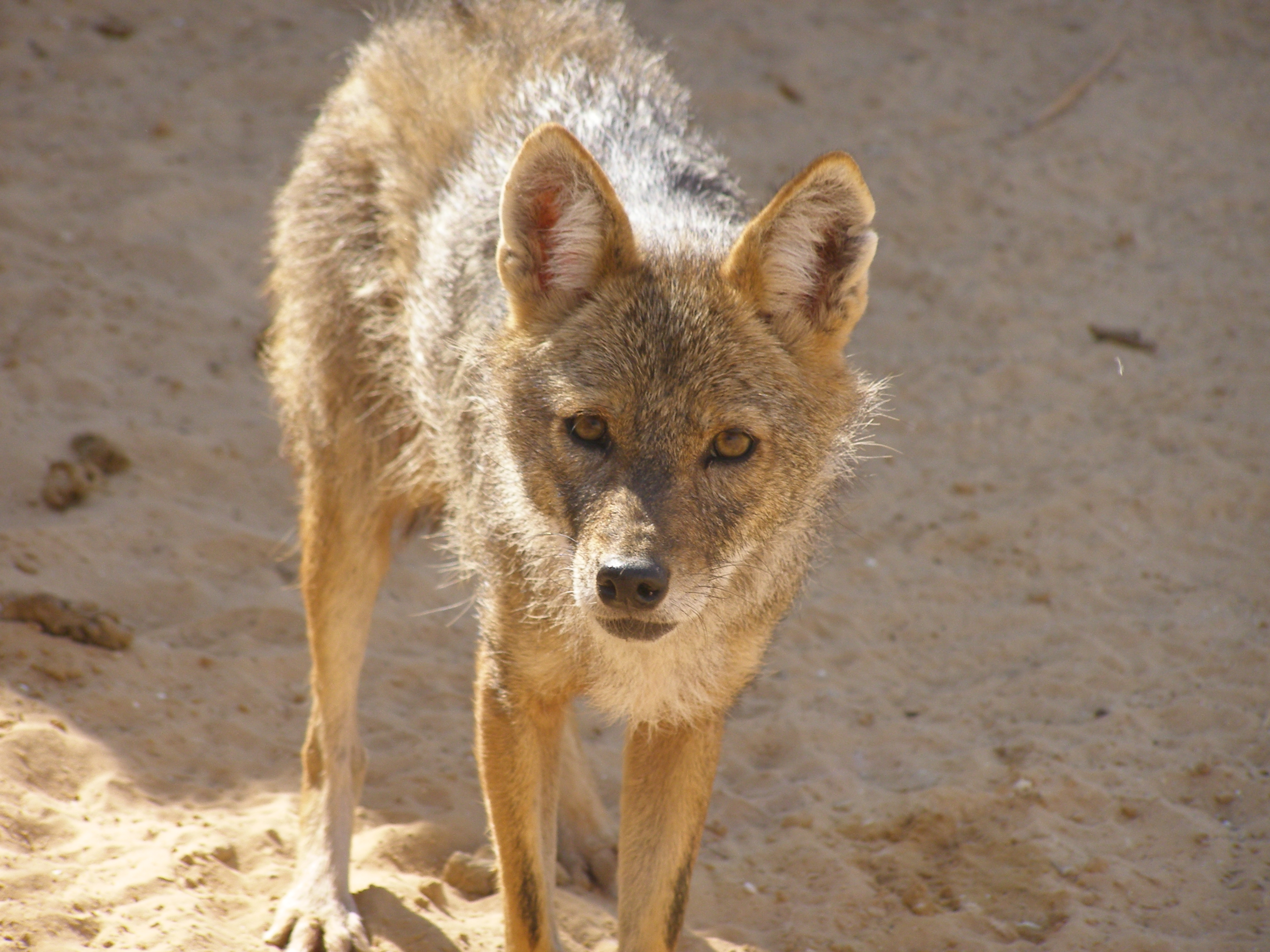
A Syrian golden jackal at a wildlife breeding center in Israel.

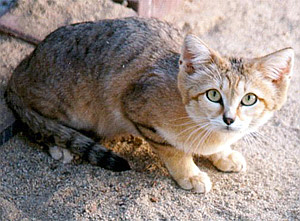
Sand cat

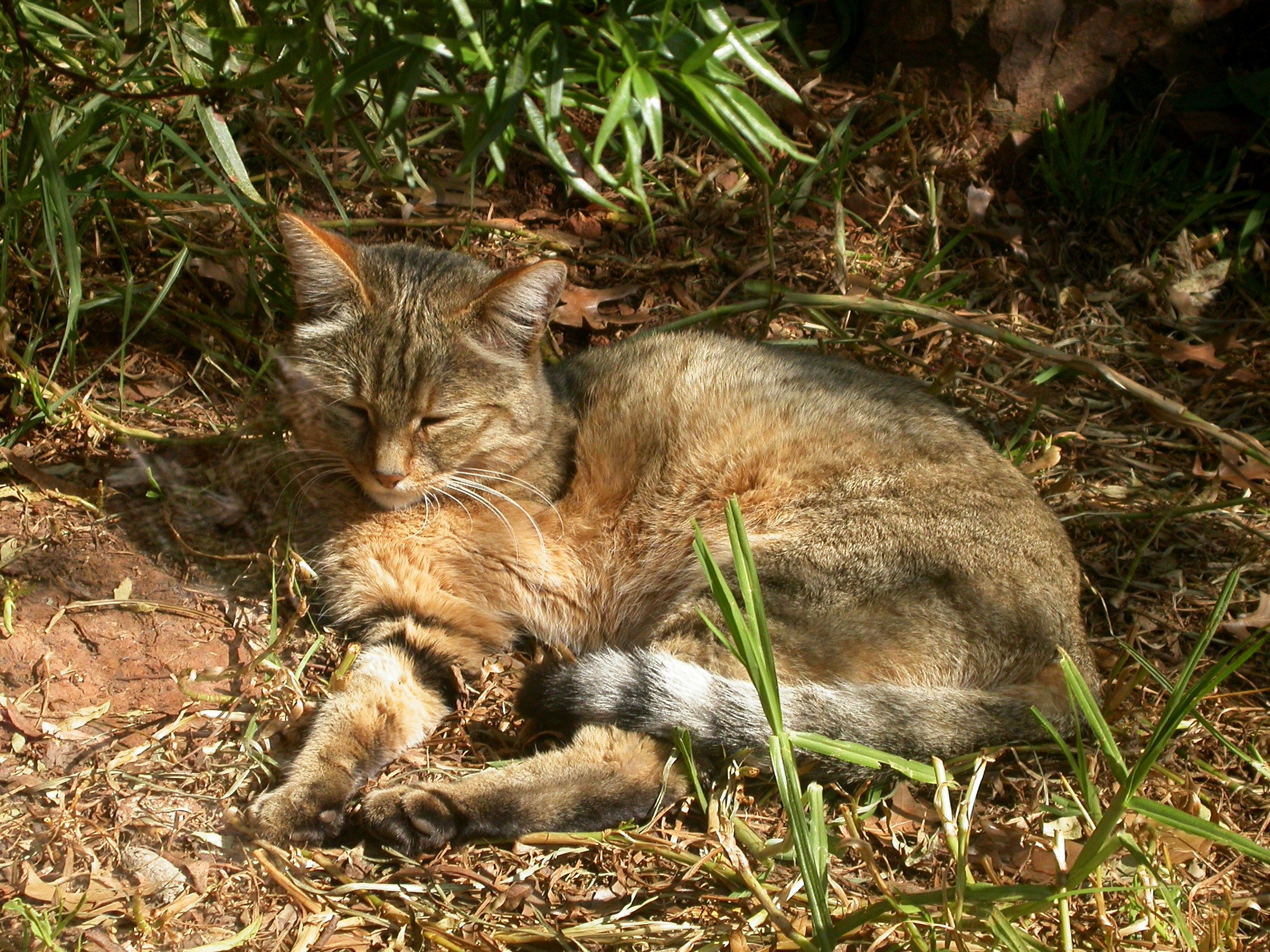
A Libyan wild cat

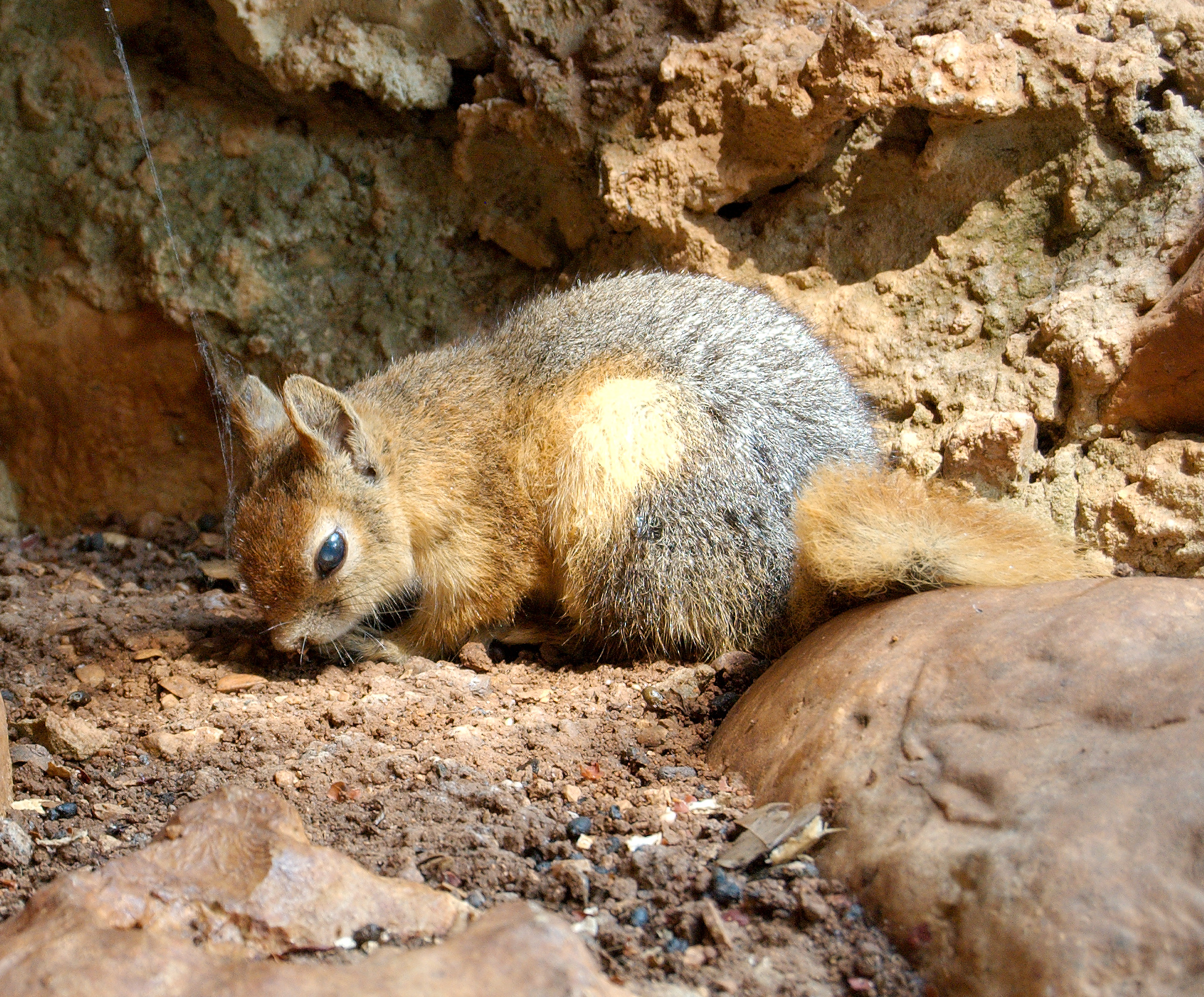
A Caucasian squirrel at the entrance to the Jeita Grotto in Lebanon

The Canidae family is represented in the Levant by five species: the gray wolf, golden jackal, red fox, Rüppell's fox, and Afghan fox. Gray wolves are the largest species of canidae, with two recognized breeds in the Levant: the Iranian breed and the Arabian breed. The Iranian breed is distributed in the northern part of the region, including northern Palestine and Jordan, through Lebanon and Syria. In contrast, the Arabian breed is found in the deserts of Palestine and Jordan, and is the smallest of the remaining gray wolf breeds. Iranian wolves are legally protected in Israel and are estimated to number around 150 in their natural habitat. In the remainder of the Levant, there are no official statistics on their numbers. Furthermore, they are still hunted and persecuted by livestock farmers who perceive them as a threat to their livelihoods. Levantine wolves rely on the remains of carcasses and carcasses discarded by humans as a source of food. Some of the most common prey of these wolves are rock hyrax, Afar gazelles, mountain gazelles, and Nubian ibex. The most prevalent and well-known species of Levantine fox is the red fox. This species is particularly disliked by poultry farmers due to its predatory behavior, which often results in the loss of chickens, pigeons, and other domesticated birds. Two distinct breeds of red foxes are found in the Levant: The Arabian breed is native to the desert, while the Palestinian breed is indigenous to forests, plains, and mountains. The two breeds are readily distinguishable. The former is characterized by a slender physique, pale coloration, and prominent ears. In contrast, the latter is more robust and fuller in appearance. The other two species of fox native to the Levant are the Rüppell's fox and the Afghan fox. The first species, also known as the sand fox, is primarily a desert animal, with a range extending from Morocco in the west to the foothills of Afghanistan in the east. It can be distinguished from the red fox by its smaller size and sandy color. The Afghan fox, also known as the Blandford's fox, steppe fox, and other names, is a common species in the southern Levant, from southern Israel to the West Bank, and in Jordan. It is similar to other desert foxes, but is more likely to consume fruit than the majority of them. In the Levant, there is a single species of jackal, the golden jackal, which is also represented by a single breed in this region, the Syrian breed. This breed is distributed throughout the Levant, including deserts, forests, mountains, and plains. The Levantine jackal (Canis aureus) is a medium-sized canid with a weight between 5 and 12 kilograms and a length of 60 to 90 centimeters. Its fur exhibits a variety of color patterns of white, black, and red. The animals are locally referred to as wawi due to their distinctive howling sound, which is well-known to villagers. Experts have noted that it is challenging to ascertain the current conservation status of Levantine jackals, given that they have been breeding with stray domesticated dogs for hundreds of years and producing numerous hybrids. There are five other cat species in the Levant: the sand cat, wild cat, jungle cat, caracal, and leopard. The sand cat is the smallest of the Levantine cats, it measures between 1.4 and 3.4 kilograms and is between 39 and 57 centimeters long, not including the tail. These cats can be distinguished from others by their flatter head, sandy color, and exclusively desert habitat. Environmental authorities in Israel are working to breed and release as many of these cats as possible in the Arabah Valley to increase their numbers, which have declined significantly. The wildcat is the most common feline species in the Levant, the ancestor of the domesticated cat, and still lives mainly in the Negev and the western mountain range of Lebanon, in Jordan and several parts of Syria. The most common breed in the country is the Libyan breed, which is believed to be the direct ancestor of the domesticated cat. These cats are readily mistaken for their domesticated cousins, though they are larger but more compact. Another Levantine feline is the bush feline, also known as the swamp feline, of which there are two breeds in the Levant, inhabiting northwestern Jordan, Syria along the Tigris and Euphrates rivers, western Lebanon, northern Israel, and the West Bank. Despite their widespread distribution, these felines are considered rare and endangered in the Levant. Their numbers have declined sharply and are still declining due to the expansion of agricultural land and the draining of the marshes surrounding some large rivers, such as the Yarmuk, Jordan, and Litani. Additionally, farmers poison and shoot them when they are seen, due to their habit of feeding on poultry. The third largest surviving feline in the Levant is the caracal, or desert lynx. This species is distributed throughout the entire country and across all of its natural habitats, despite its reputation as a desert animal. Despite its reputation as a desert animal, The only recognized breed of this species is found in the Levant, with the most significant populations concentrated in the Negev and the Dead Sea depression. The largest surviving felines of the Levantine region are tigers, which are classified into two breeds. According to various scholars, the two breeds are the Arabian and the Persian or Anatolian. The Arabian tiger is still present in the Hebron and Negev deserts in small numbers, with an estimated population of around 20 in the 1970s. They prey on ibex, mountain gazelles, hyrax, and domesticated goats. In the 1970s, an estimated 20 tigers were present in the region, preying on ibex, mountain gazelles, wolverines, and domesticated goats. With regard to the second tiger population in the Levant, there is a divergence of opinion among scientists as to whether it should be regarded as a distinct breed, the Anatolian breed, or whether it should be included as a western population of the Persian breed. However, if it is considered a separate breed, the survival of any individuals is uncertain. The last documented sightings of tigers in northern Israel occurred in the 1980s. Some sources continue to assert the presence of a few tigers in the Galilee and Golan regions. However, experts have posited that these may be Arabian tigers. In Syria and Lebanon, these tigers are extinct.

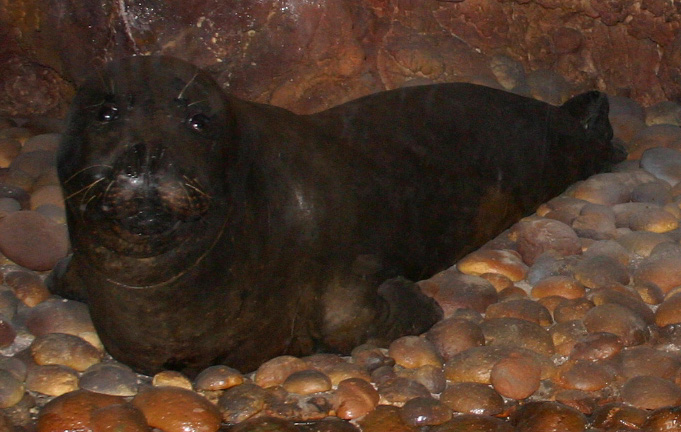
Mediterranean monk seal

With regard to the family of seals, the Levant is represented by a single species, the Mediterranean monk seal. This species is classified as endangered globally, with a small population concentrated on the Syrian coast and in the northern Lebanese coast. The Palm Islands Reserve off the coast of Tripoli is a particularly notable habitat, offering a combination of rocky islands and numerous caves that provide a safe refuge for the seals and enable them to give birth to their young.

=== Rodents, insectivora, and rabbits ===
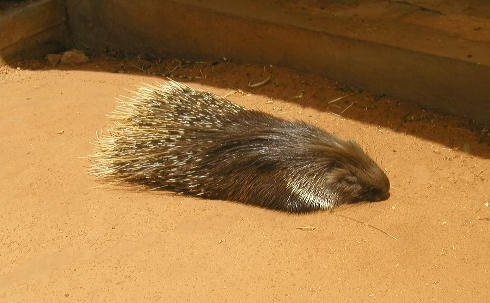
Indian crested porcupine

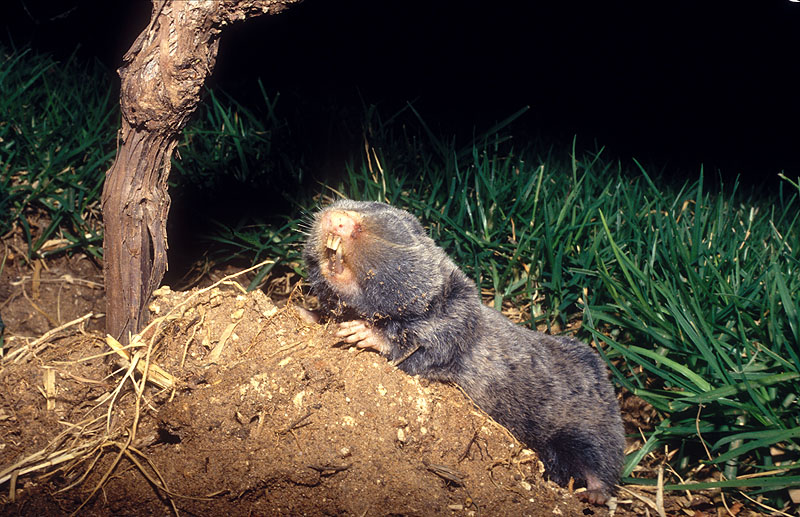
A Palestinian mole sits on an earthen block, showing the large teeth it uses to dig tunnels.

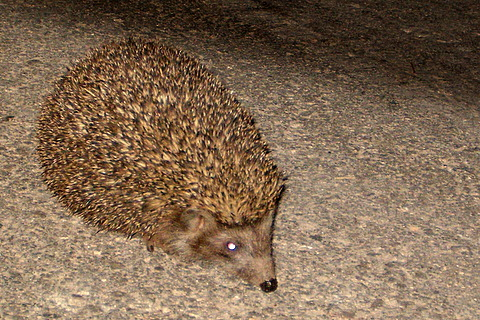
Eastern European hedgehog

Two species of squirrels are native to the Levant: The two types of squirrels that inhabit the Levant are the Caucasian or Persian squirrel and the Anatolian ground squirrel. The Caucasian squirrel is a small arboreal rodent with a reddish underside and grayish upper surface. It is a species that inhabits temperate broad-leaved and mixed forests. The most abundant populations of this species are found in the forests of the Syrian coast, the forests of the western Lebanon mountain range, and northern Palestine. These animals are diurnal and are observed to prefer oak and cedar forests. The Anatolian ground squirrel (Spermophilus taurensis) is a terrestrial species that inhabits the Levantine steppe and semi-desert regions, as well as plains and mountain meadows at altitudes ranging from 800 to 2,900 meters. These squirrels are detested by farmers for their tendency to colonize agricultural lands and kill crops. However, experts consider them an essential species in the Levantine steppe ecosystem, as they serve as a food source for numerous predators, including owls, scavengers, hawks, and red foxes. The largest Levantine rodent is the Indian crested porcupine, which is locally known as the porcupine. This species is distributed throughout the Levantine region, though it is rarely visible due to its nocturnal activity. The evidence of its presence in an area typically consists of a few scattered quills. Porcupines use these spines as a defensive mechanism against predators. They are typically found in rocky areas and river valleys, with burrows often located in rock crevices or caves. Farmers often regard porcupines as a nuisance due to their predilection for certain crops that bear resemblance to the food they consume in the wild, including potatoes, onions, and carrots. One of the most distinctive rodents native to the Levant is the Palestinian mole. This burrow-dwelling creature feeds on plant bulbs and roots, excavating underground pathways with its long teeth. Its activities often result in the formation of large clumps of soil in agricultural fields. These animals are primarily found in Mediterranean hedgerows and are at risk of extinction due to loss of habitat. Two species of dormouse are known to inhabit the Levant. The forest dormouse and the Asian garden dormouse are both arboreal mammals that inhabit temperate forests, hedgerows, and rocky areas. Both species are found in temperate forests, hedgerows, and rocky areas. The country's mouse fauna is notably diverse, encompassing a multitude of species. Among these, the following are particularly noteworthy: house mouse, black rat, brown rat, Euphrates gerbil, Tristram's rat, Egyptian spiny mouse, golden spiny mouse, yellow-necked woodland mouse, broad-toothed woodland mouse, and Levantine sow mouse. The golden hamster, colloquially referred to as the abu jarab, is endemic to northern Syria and southern Turkey. Additionally, the Turkish hamster, the gray hamster, and numerous other species are found in these regions.

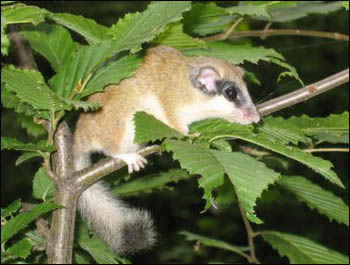
Forest dormouse

The insectivora family comprises five species, three of which belong to the hedgehog family and two of which belong to the shrew family. Hedgehogs are distributed throughout the Levant, with the most common species being the long-eared hedgehog. This species is found in the Negev Desert and extends southward across the length of Palestine through Lebanon and the Syrian coast. It can be distinguished from other hedgehogs by its shorter spines. Additionally, there is the Eastern European hedgehog or the southern white-breasted hedgehog. It is common in mountainous and hilly areas, where it is known as the kebab alshook or kebabet alshook. It is associated with some superstitious beliefs, including the notion that its blood has a healing power. One of the smallest species of hedgehog, the Abyssinian hedgehog or desert hedgehog, is endemic to the Levant region, with a distribution limited to southern Palestine and the Syrian Desert. There are only two recognized species of Levantine shrews, the bicolor shrew and the lesser white-toothed shrew are the only two species of Levantine shrews. The latter is the smallest of all Levantine mammals.

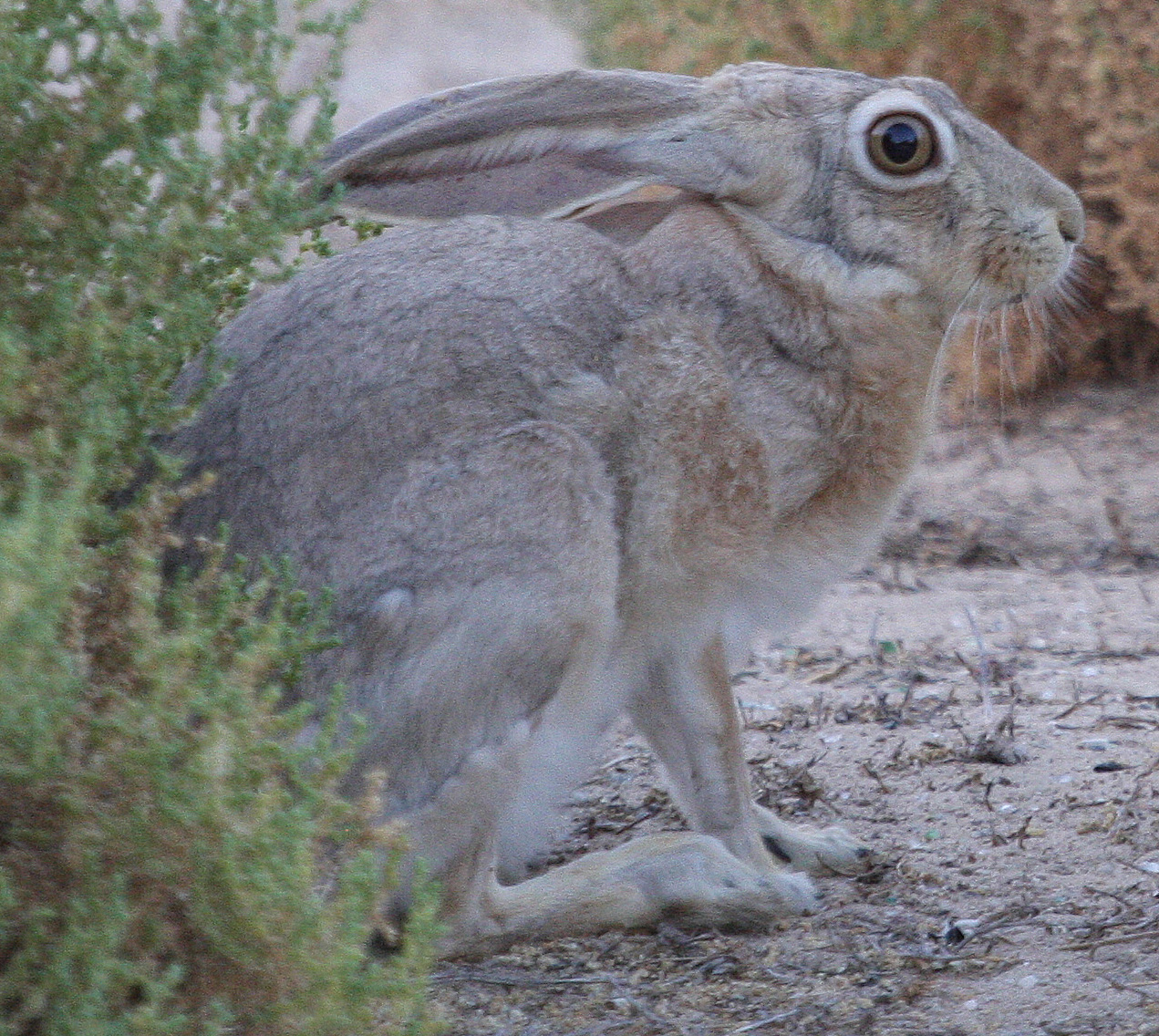
The Cape hare

Two species of lagomorphs are native to the Levant, the European rabbit and the Cape hare, both of which are also known in Arabic as al-qawaa. The Cape hare is distributed throughout the entire Levantine region and across a range of natural habitats. Two breeds of the Cape hare have been identified in the Levant, the Syrian breed, which inhabits the Mediterranean temperate regions and is morphologically similar to the European hare, and the Egyptian breed, which is smaller and thinner, inhabiting the Negev Desert and the Jordan Valley. European hares are primarily distributed in plains and meadows, with a slightly larger body size than Cape hares. Some scientists posit that they may be one species, but the prevailing view is that they are two species. Although there is evidence of ongoing natural hybridization between the two, this does not appear to be the case elsewhere in the world.

=== Artiodactyls ===
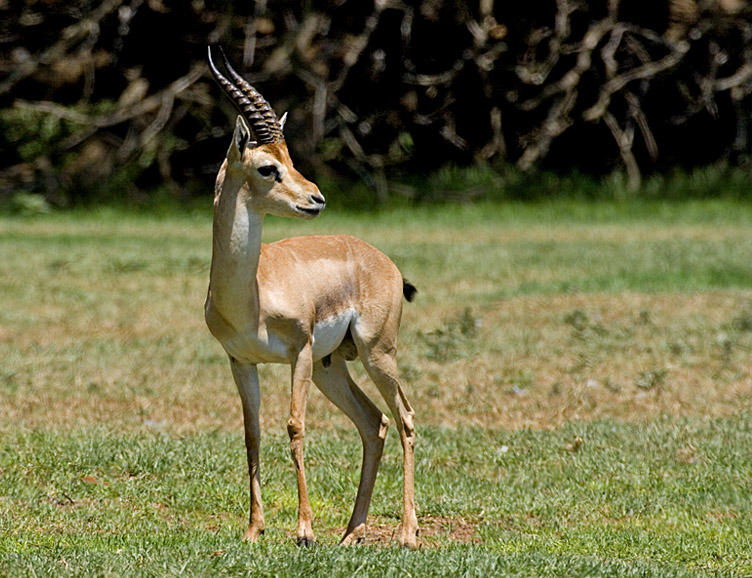
Mountain deer in northern Israel

The Levant's species in the order Artiodactyl was once diverse and beautiful. However, the introduction of firearms into the hands of Bedouins and villagers in the early 20th century led to the extinction of a large number of species, with only a few, mostly smaller species, remaining. Despite the reintroduction of some extinct Artiodactyl, species that have persisted from the early 20th century to the present include: mountain gazelle, Afar gazelle, tufted gazelle, wild boar, and Nubian ibex. The mountain gazelle, locally known as the adami or simply "gazelle", is widely distributed in the Levant, occurring in a variety of habitats. It can be found in the deserts of Palestine, Jordan, and Syria, on the slopes of the East and West Lebanon mountain ranges, the mountains of the Syrian coast, and in the coastal plains. Three distinct breeds of mountain gazelles are found in the Levant, the most common mountain gazelle breed is the ghazali, with an estimated population of between 5,000 and 6,000 in northern Israel. The sinti breed is found in the Arabah Valley, while the merel breed inhabits the mountains surrounding Jerusalem.

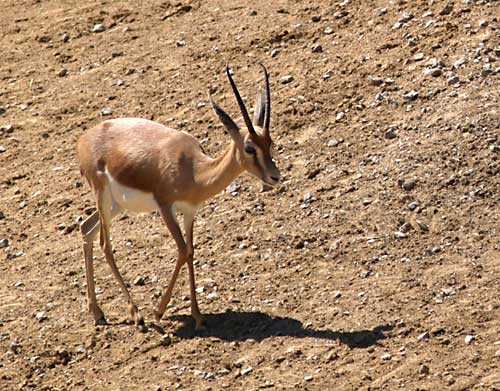
Puck deer

The Afar gazelle or dorcas gazelle, is the most common gazelle in the Levant. It is primarily a desert-dwelling animal that has supplanted the mountain gazelle in the southern Levant, as it is more suited to desert life and the scarcity of water. Despite this, some of these gazelles occasionally undertake a northward migration to the Mediterranean plains and plateaus of Palestine. But this is rare. They typically reside in small groups of three to seven. However, in the Negev, they have been observed traveling in herds of approximately 20. In the Levant, the Arabian sand gazelle is known as the reem and can only be found in the Syrian Desert, where they live in large herds. The gazelle is referenced in numerous archaeological inscriptions from Palmyra, Petra, and other sites, where it is depicted as a source of food. It has been demonstrated that hunters of the period used domesticated falcons to hunt these animals, and that some were sacrificed to the gods.

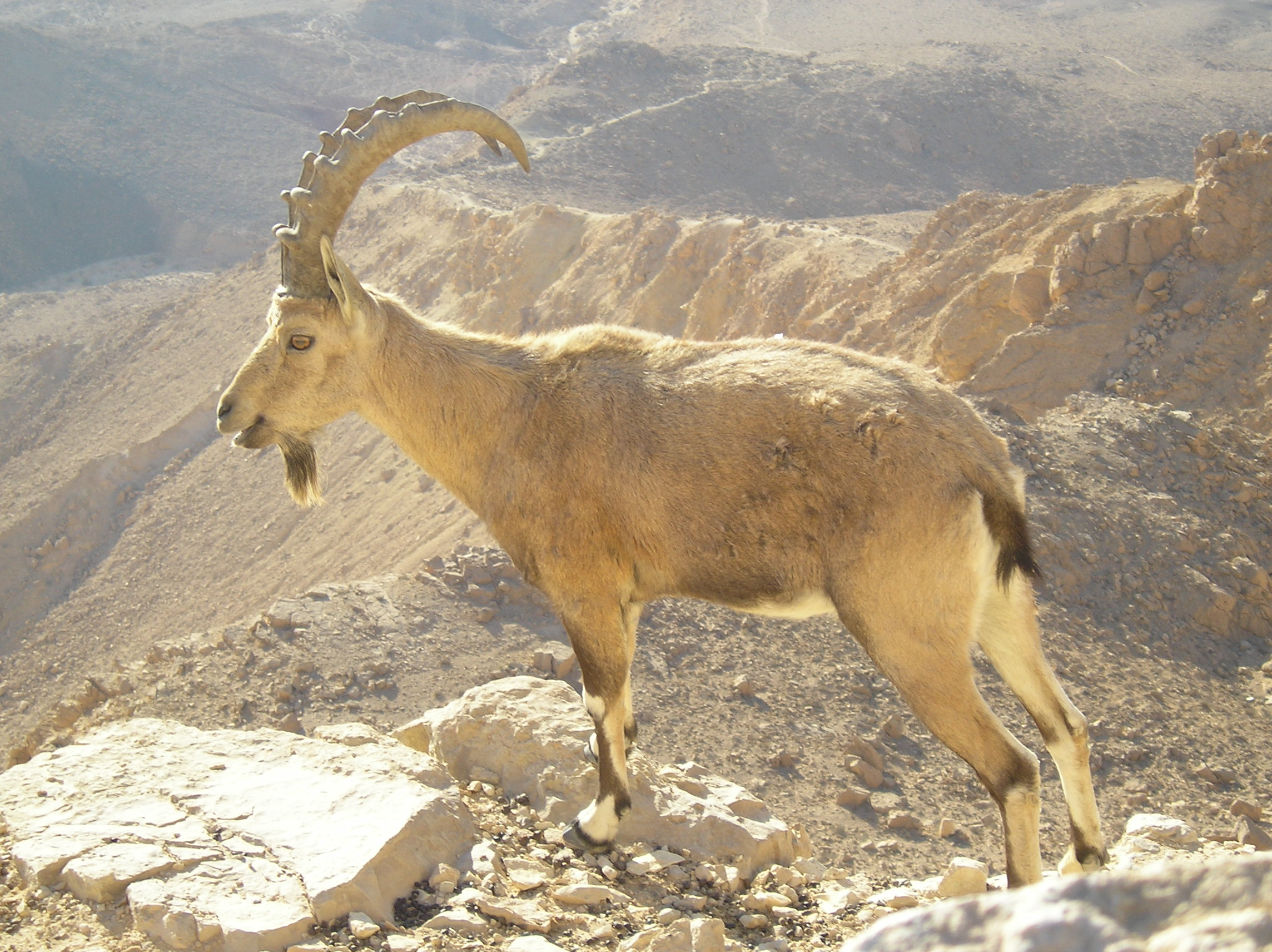
Nubian ibex in the Negev Desert

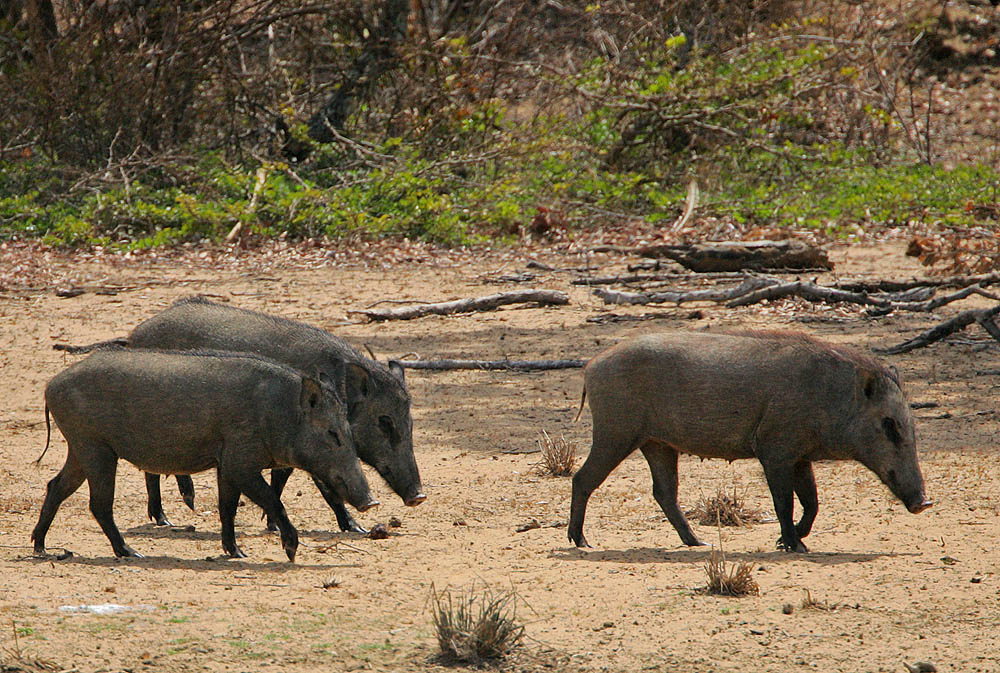
A group of female wild boars

Despite being hunted by humans, wild boars are the most widespread Artiodactyla in the Levant. This is due to their high fecundity rate, which allows them to make up for their annual shortfall in numbers remarkably quickly. One breed of wild boar inhabits the Levant, the Libyan breed. The Libyan wild boar exhibits a preference for deciduous forests as a natural habitat, and it can also be found in swamps and lake basins. These animals are of great importance to the Levantine ecosystem. Their habit of turning the soil in search of insects and worms leads to the burial and natural growth of many nuts, including oak, walnuts, and almonds. Additionally, wild boars are a food source for wolves, hyenas, and tigers. Wild boars are among the most detested animals by Levantine farmers, as consume agricultural crops and kill lambs, camels, and poultry. The remaining Nubian ibex of the Levant are found in southern Palestine and Jordan, where they inhabit arid mountains and graze on grasses and shrubs. These plants, in turn, serve as food for wolves, leopards, golden eagles, and osprey. Nubian ibexes have symbolic importance in Israel as they are mentioned in the Torah.

=== Other mammals ===
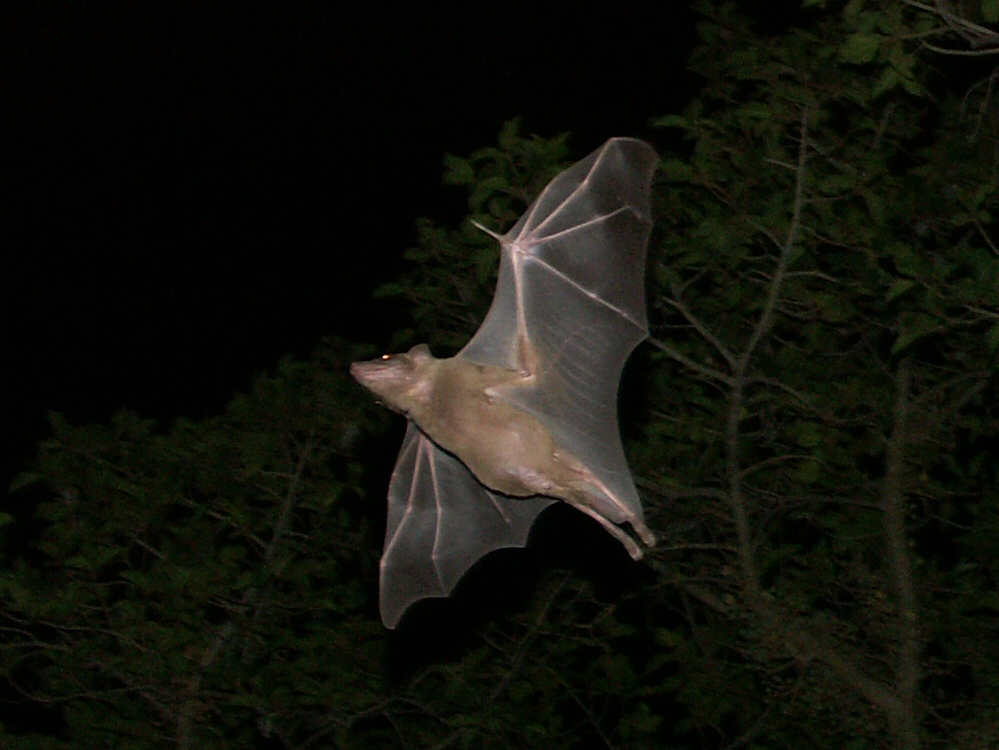
An Egyptian fruit bat flies in Tel Aviv, Israel

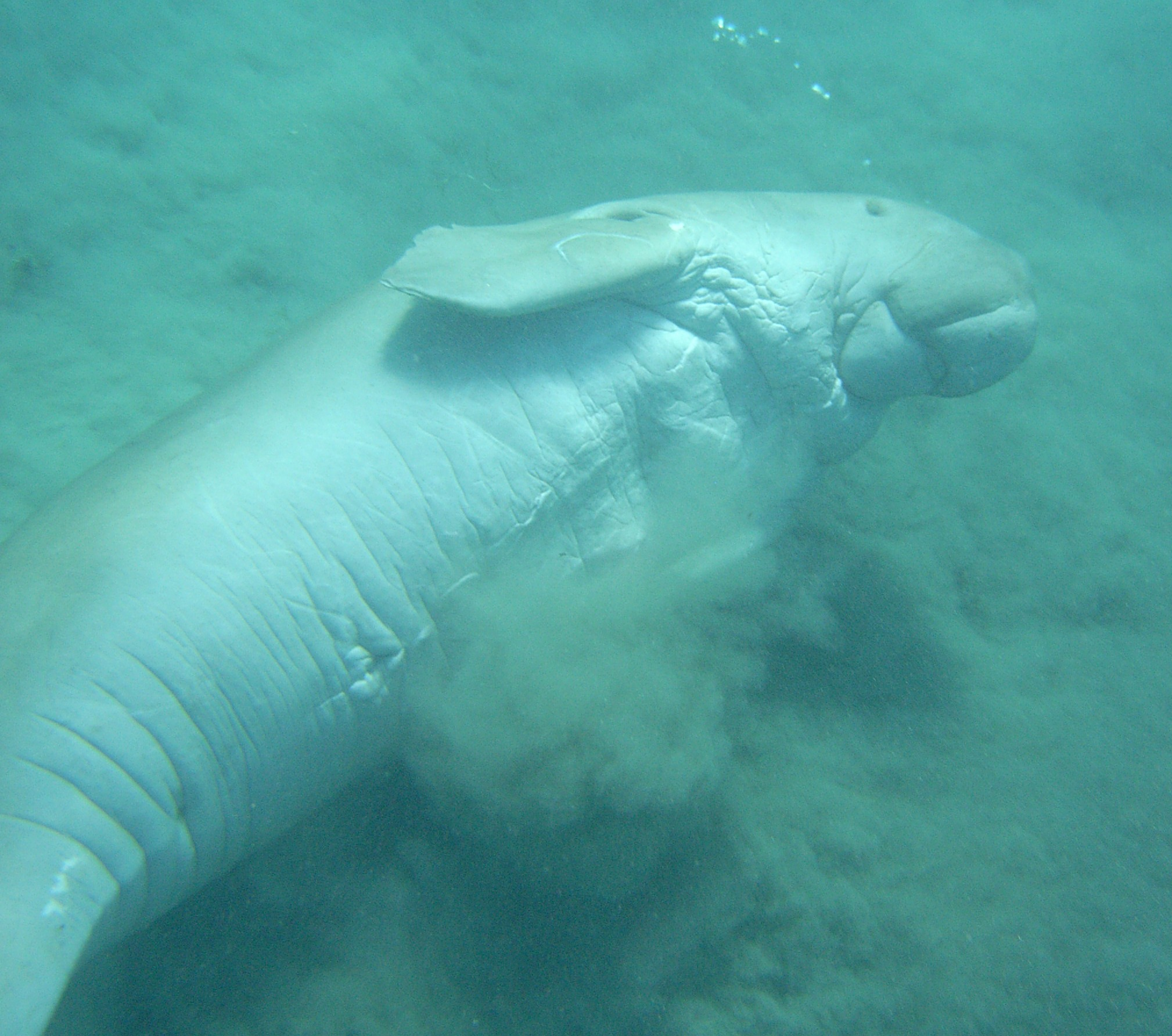
Dugong

The order of bats (Chiroptera) is the most diverse order of mammals in the Levant. The largest Levantine bat is the Egyptian fruit bat, easily distinguished from insectivorous bats by its long-snouted, dog-like face. Other more common Levantine bats include the common pipistrelle, lesser horseshoe bat, greater horseshoe bat, and gray-eared bat. The common pipistrelle, lesser horseshoe bat, greater horseshoe bat, and gray-eared bat are examples of Levantine bats. The Mediterranean, the Levantine branch of the Mediterranean Sea, is home to around 18 species of cetaceans, six of which are confirmed to be permanently present, the bottlenose dolphin, striped dolphin, Risso's dolphin, common dolphin, narrow-snouted dolphin, and Cuvier's beaked whale. The first species is the most common cetacean in Levantine waters, as evidenced by its prevalence among fishermen and the frequency with which it is caught in their nets by mistake. On rare occasions, sperm and fin whales have been observed floating off the Levantine coastline. Experts hypothesize that these may be the carcasses of animals that died far away and were carried eastward by the waves. There is no confirmation that these animals live off Levantine beaches, although they have sometimes been seen close to Greek shores. One of the surviving cetaceans that is believed to inhabit the Mediterranean and Red Seas is the killer whale, the false killer whale, and Blainville's beaked whale. One of the Levant's most distinctive marine mammals is a Sirenia known as the dugong. This large animal is found in the waters off the Israeli and Jordanian Red Sea coasts, where it spends the majority of its time grazing among coral reefs. The closest mammalian relatives to the dugong is the rock and Cape hyraxes. These small, chunky animals are mentioned in the Torah and are distributed across the entire Levant from southern Palestine and Jordan to southern Turkey. They play an important role in the ecosystem, as they aid in the dispersal of tree seeds by gnawing on their fruits and transporting them to distant locations. Additionally, they serve as an important food source for many predators.

=== Introduced mammals ===
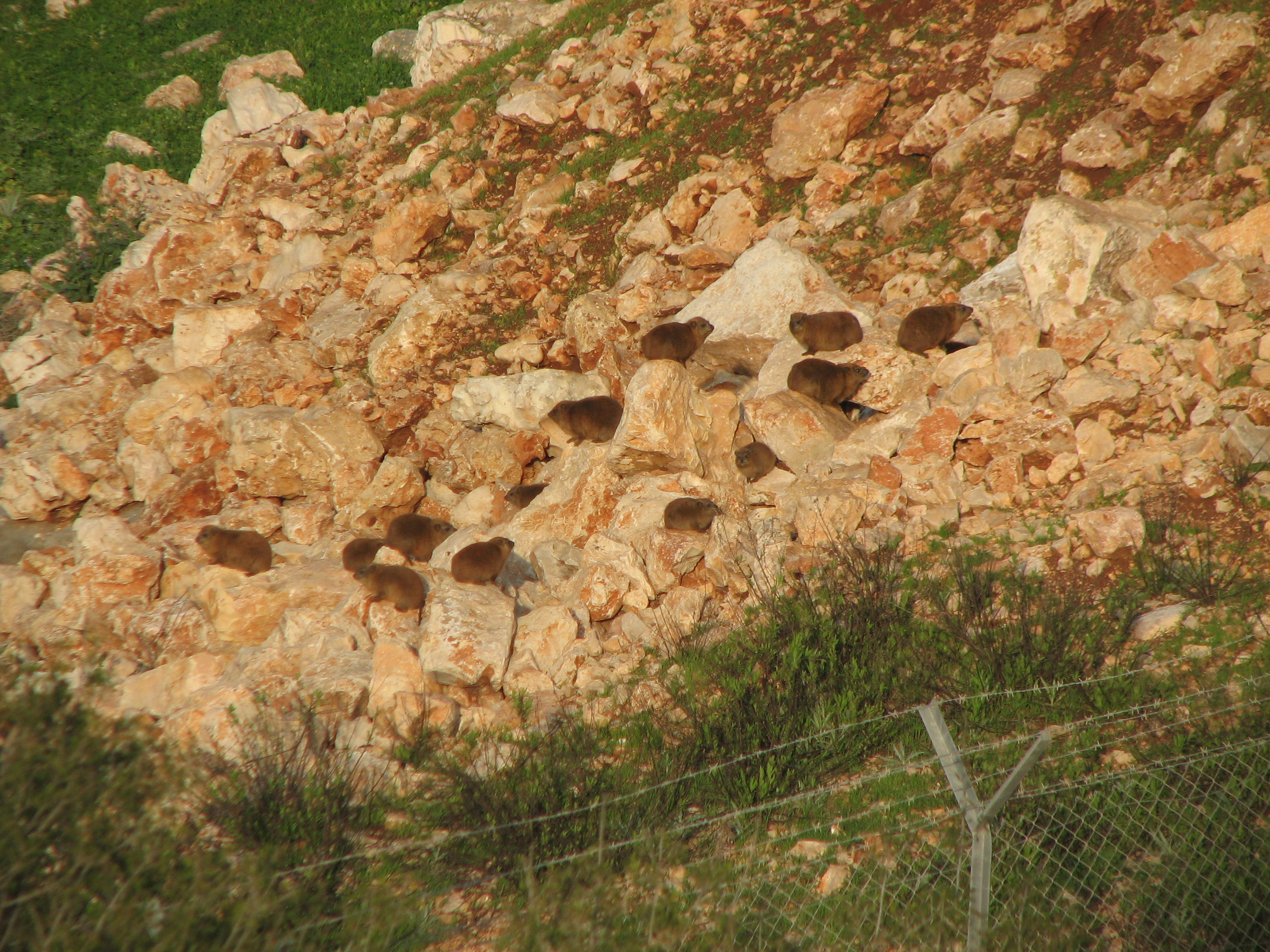
A rock hyrax colony on the Lebanese–Israeli border

Four species of foreign mammals have been introduced to the Levant by humans, two of which were introduced accidentally and two of which were introduced intentionally. The nutria, a rodent native to South America, was introduced to farms in northern Israel for the fur trade. A small number of individuals rapidly dispersed into the surrounding area and established a presence in and around Lake Houla. Their activities posed a significant threat to the marshy vegetation in that region, as well as a nuisance to breeding birds. Their predation on vegetation deprived numerous birds of their natural habitats and nesting sites. Additionally, Indian palm squirrels were inadvertently introduced to Israel via the pet, fruit, and spice trade. Over time, some have been discovered in crates of nuts and spices, released into the wild, or have escaped on their own.

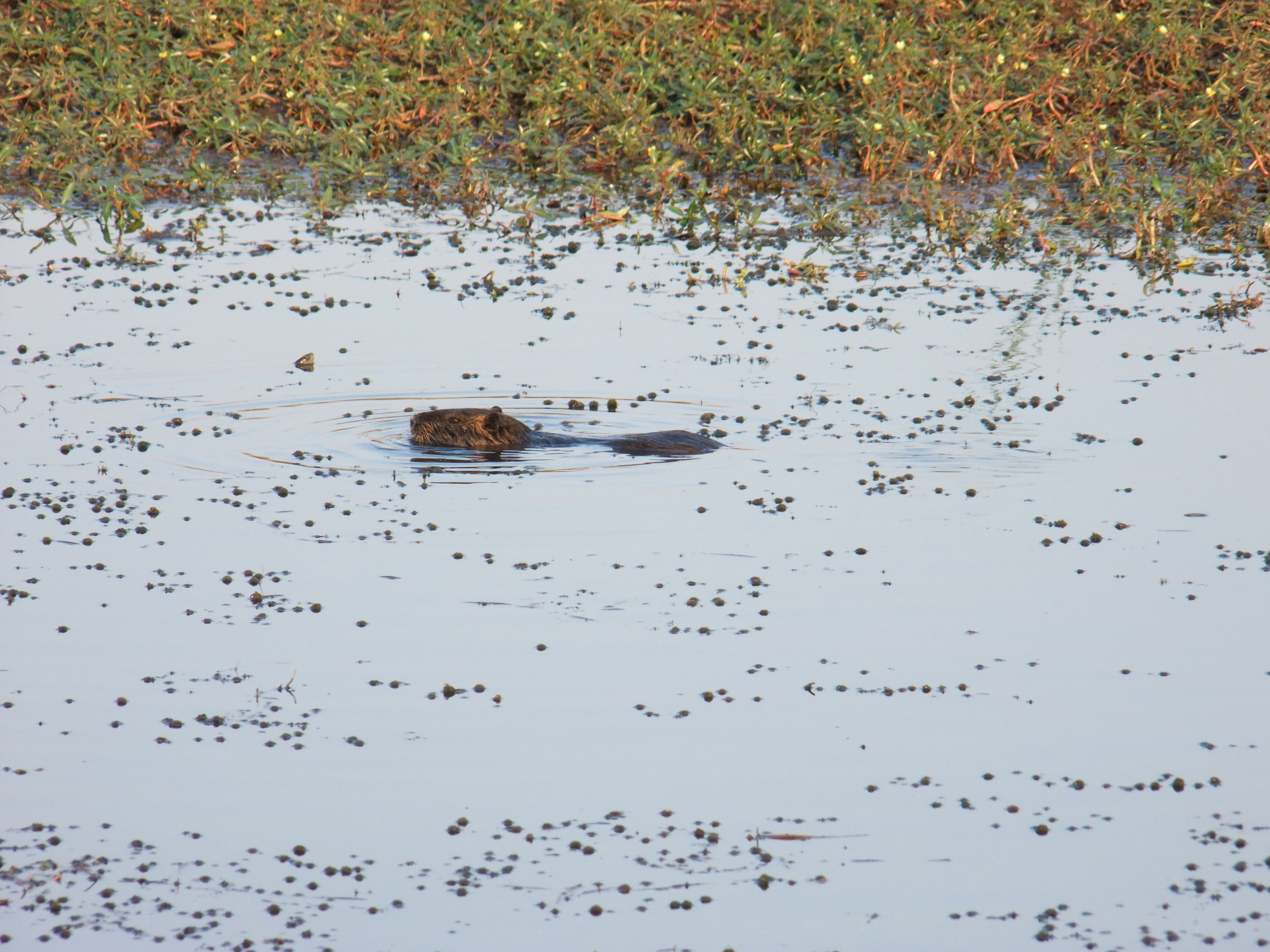
Nutria in Lake Hula in northern Israel

The introduction of domesticated water buffalo to the Levant occurred around 600 AD, providing an additional source of meat and milk for the growing human population and for use in plowing and traction. In the mid-20th century, a number of environmental associations and authorities in the Levant released a few herds of these animals into important swamps. It has been demonstrated that these marshes constitute an important site for migratory birds. The presence of buffalo grazing has been found to be highly beneficial for the well-being of these birds, as it encourages the growth of plants and the creation of new habitats for reptiles, amphibians, and birds. One of the mammals recently introduced to the Levant is the African common eland, also known as the bouqa. Israeli military authorities have intentionally introduced this species to the border areas with Lebanon to clear the area of bramble and canopy vegetation that obstructs the vision of observers and cameras aimed at monitoring the movements of Hezbollah fighters and the Lebanese army.

=== Extinct and re-introduced mammals ===
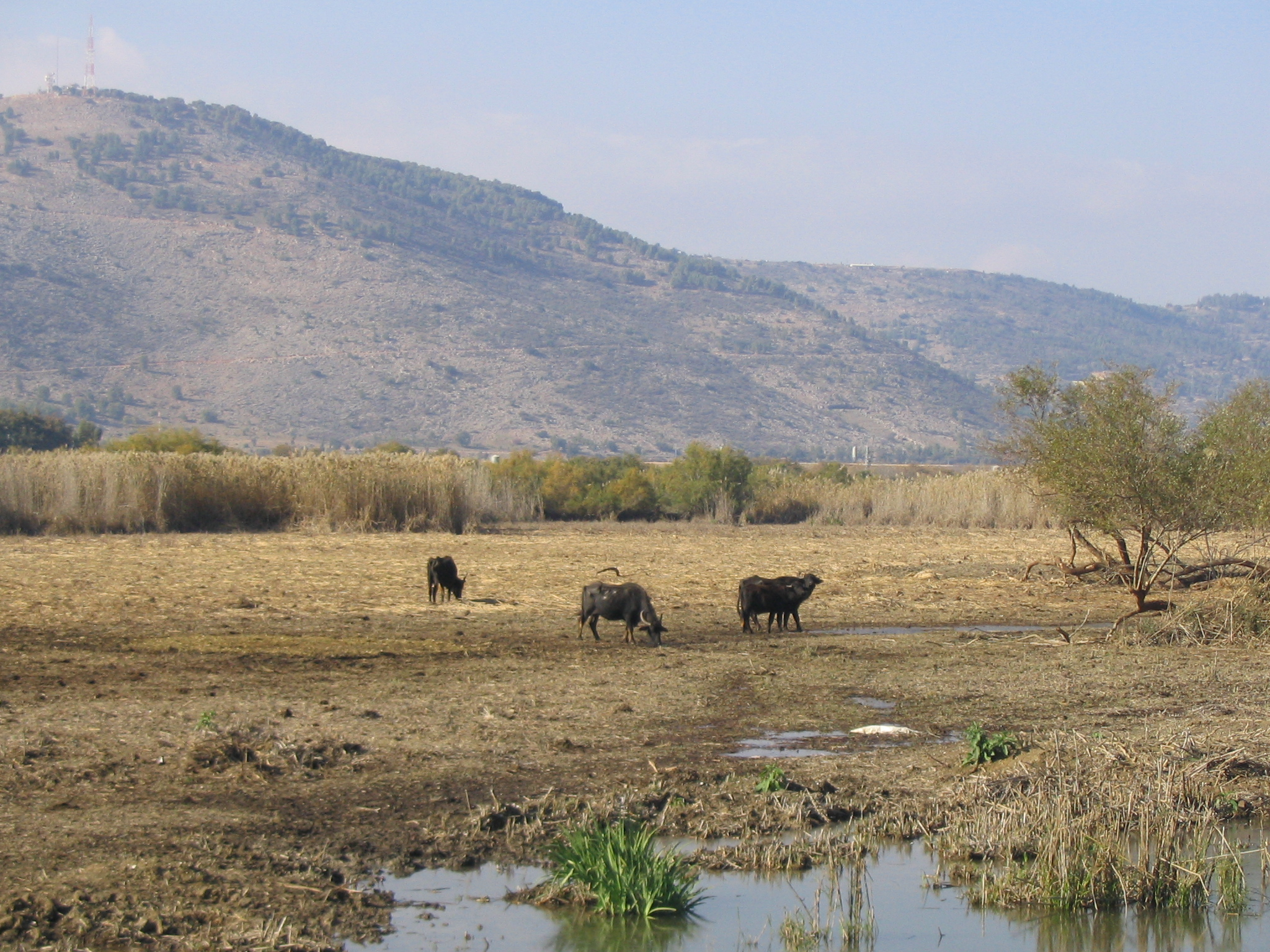
Wild water buffalo in the Hula Swamp, northern Israel, near the border with Lebanon.

A number of species of large mammals native to Eurasia and Africa colonized the Levant during the prehistoric period. It is likely that early humans who settled in the region encountered these animals, hunted and ate them. The overwhelming majority of these animals perished from natural causes approximately 1.4 or 1.8 million years ago. The fossils of these animals have been discovered in a number of locations, with the most notable being the Hebron Mountains. In this area, the remains of large species, including those that had been cut with man-made tools, have been uncovered. The fossils of Asian elephants, rhinoceroses, giraffes, water buffaloes, and spotted hyenas have been discovered in the area. All of the significant carnivores native to the Levant region became extinct during the late 19th or early 20th century. On one hand, humans had hunted a significant portion of their game, transforming them into livestock feeders, which posed a serious threat to farmers and their livelihoods. The expansion of human populations led to an increase in the number of human settlements which increased the encroachment on the animal habitats. This resulted in the extinction of numerous herbivores, who have lost their habitats, and subsequently, carnivores, who have lost their main source of food.

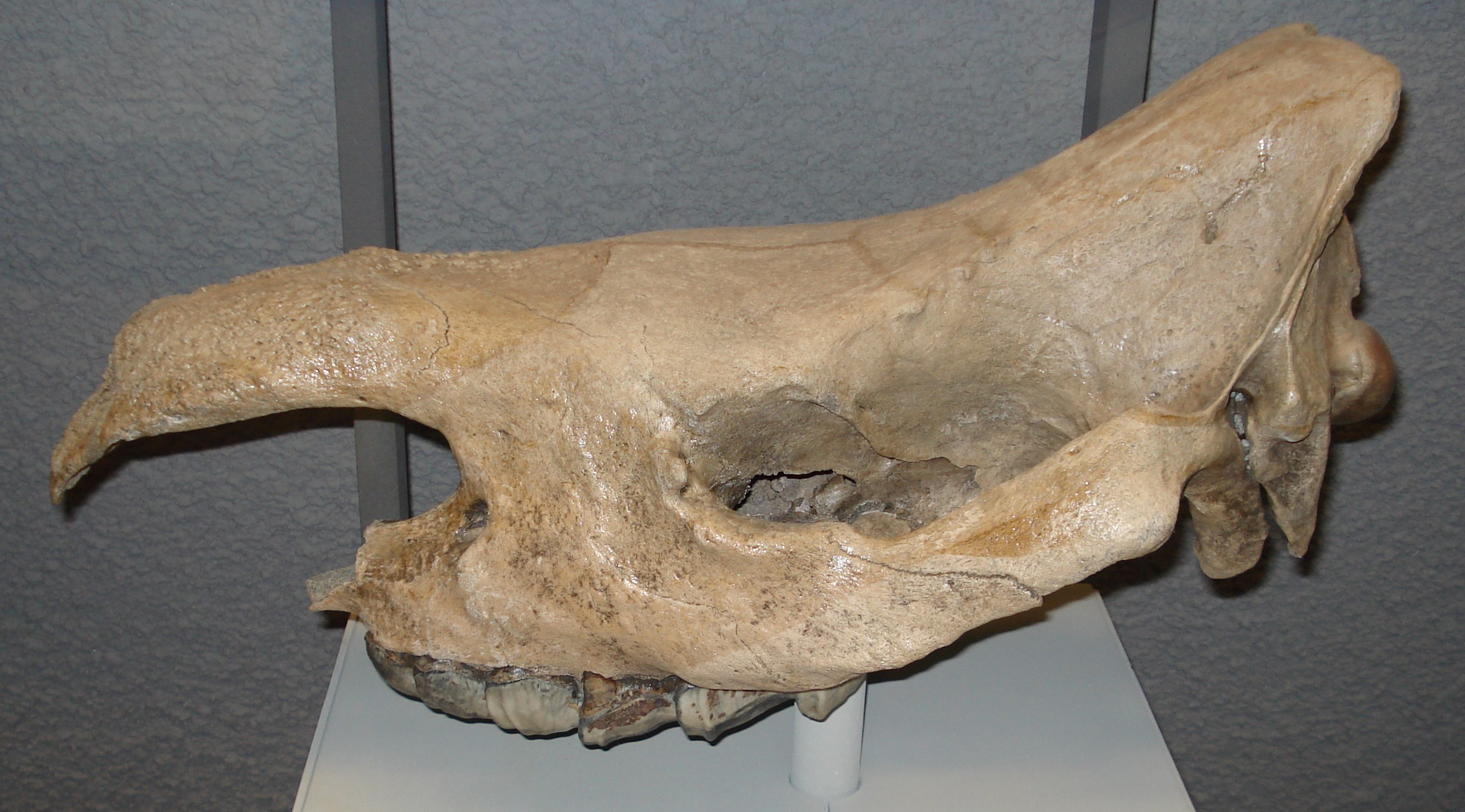
The fossilized skull of a rhinoceros of the genus Stephanorhinus, that apparently colonized Israel, the Palestinian territories, and Lebanon.

Asiatic lions, the Levant's largest carnivore, are believed to have been a common feature of the Levantine landscape for thousands of years. The lion is referenced on numerous occasions in the Torah, as well as in the writings of Hebrew, Muslim, Greek, and other authors and storytellers. Its presence is also evidenced by several ancient inscriptions and mosaics. The Asiatic lion was a common sight in rural Palestine and Lebanon until the Crusades, when its numbers began to decline. It was last mentioned in the writings of Arab scholars from the 13th and 14th centuries. The Syrian brown bear was a common large carnivore in northern Palestine, Lebanon, and the Syrian coast for centuries. It is mentioned in the Torah, where it is recorded that David killed a bear that attacked his sheep, and two bears killed the forty-two boys who mocked Elisha. The last known Syrian brown bear in the Levant is believed to have been killed in 1917. However, anecdotal evidence suggests that villagers in the suburbs of Damascus, the eastern Lebanon mountain range, and Mount Hermon continued to observe bears foraging in their orchards and vineyards well into the 1950s.

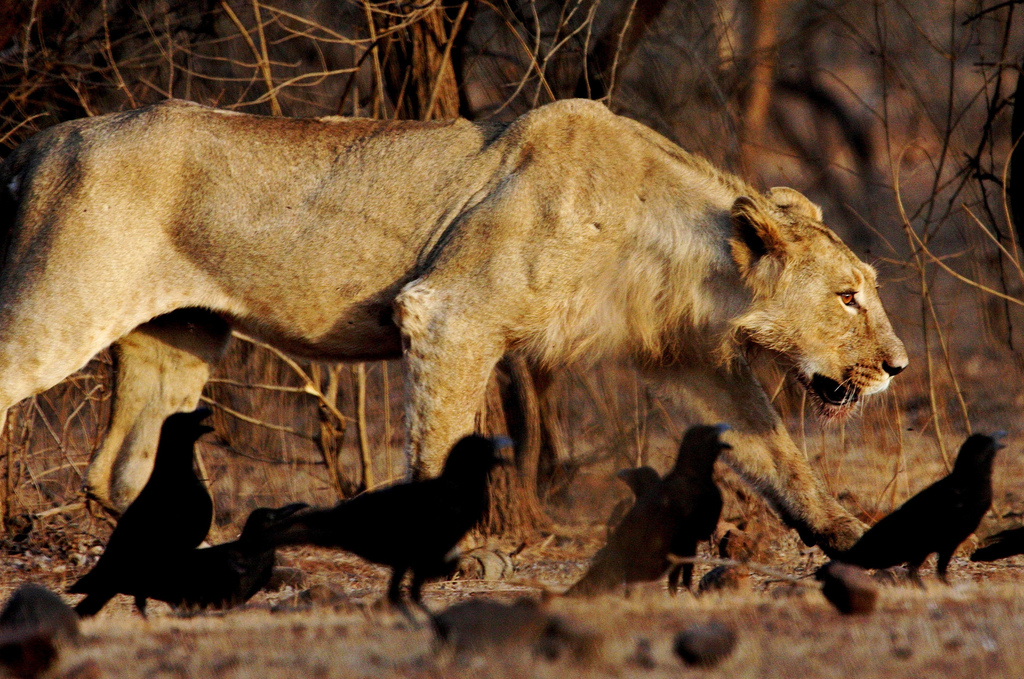
An Asiatic lion in India's Gir Forest Park, its only remaining habitat.

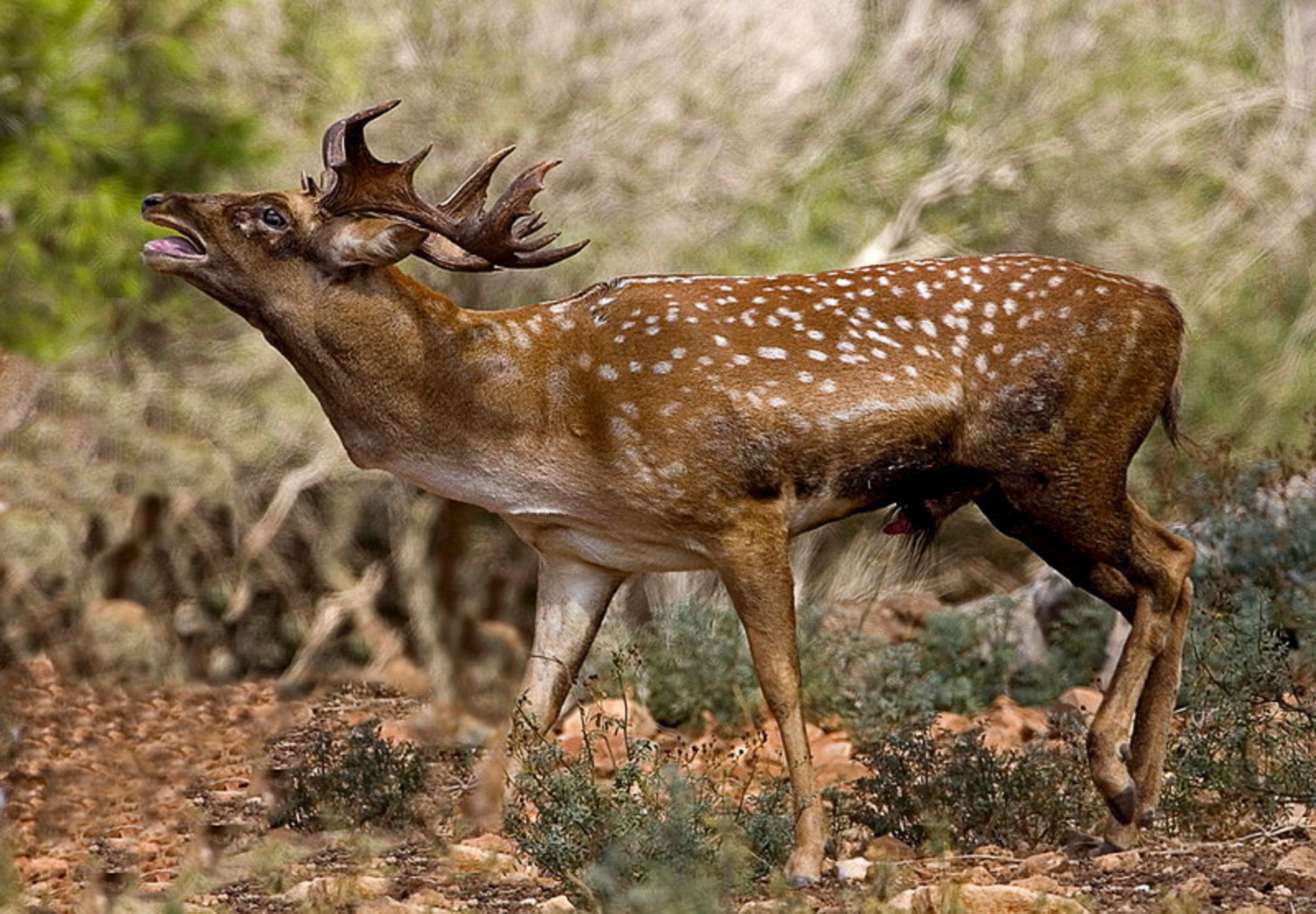
A male Persian brown deer in the Mount Carmel Nature Reserve

The Persian brown deer is one of the most renowned large herbivores that once inhabited the Levant. The species was driven to extinction by unregulated, intensive hunting in the early 20th century. It was long believed to be extinct, with no surviving individuals. However, in 1956, a small herd of approximately 25 was discovered in northern Iran. In 1978, four deer were illegally imported into Israel and placed in the Hai Bar Yotvata Carmelite Wildlife Sanctuary with the intention of propagating threatened wildlife. Two additional deer were subsequently brought from Europe to supplement the population. Since that time, their numbers have increased exponentially, with approximately 650 animals currently residing in the wild in the Galilee, Mount Carmel, and Wadi Surar. Conversely, Jordan has reintroduced the European fallow deer instead of the Persian deer to the Ajloun Forest Reserve, due to the difficulty of obtaining any Persian deer, given their small number and the unwillingness to risk losing one of them. It is challenging to obtain Persian deer due to their rarity and the inherent risk of losing one. Other herbivores that have been reintroduced to the northern Levant include, in northern Israel, wild goats, Anatolian aurochs, and European roe deer. These have also been reintroduced in Jordan.

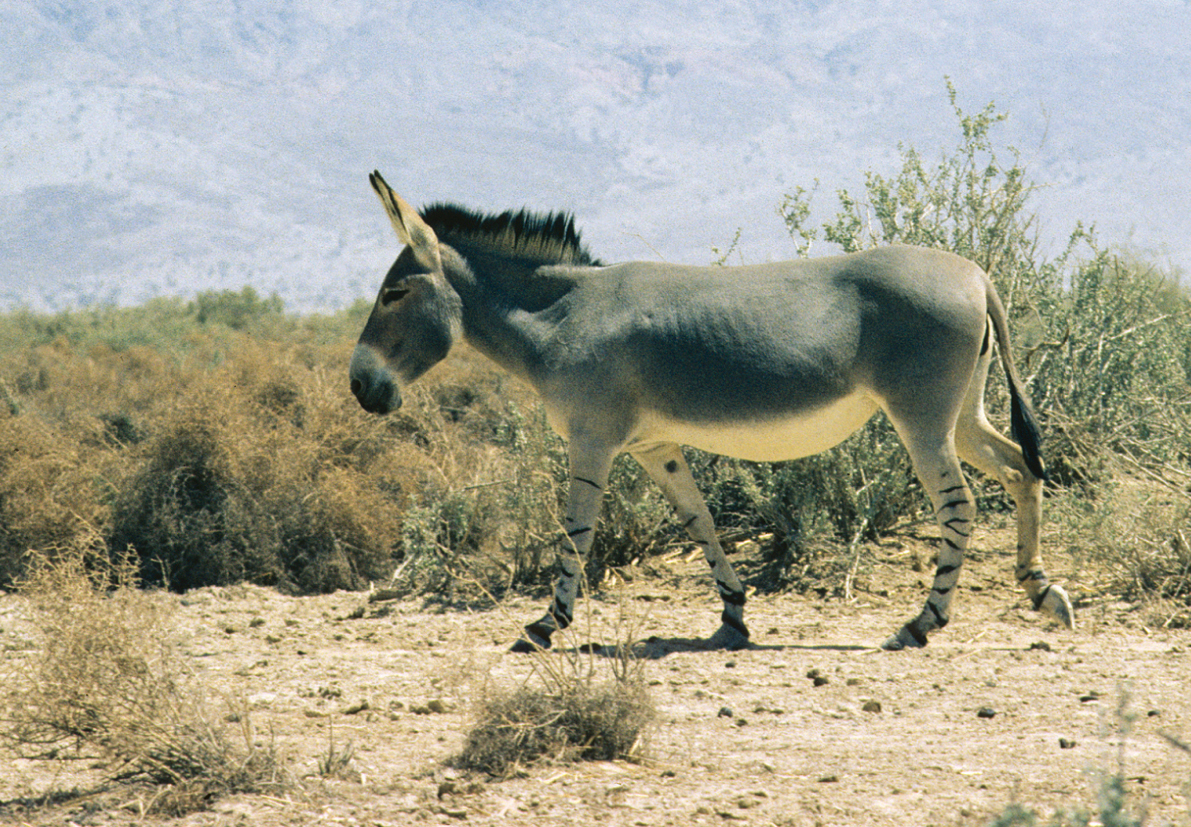
Somali wild ass (Equus africanus somaliensis) from Eritrea, in Hai Bar Yotvata wildlife park, Israel

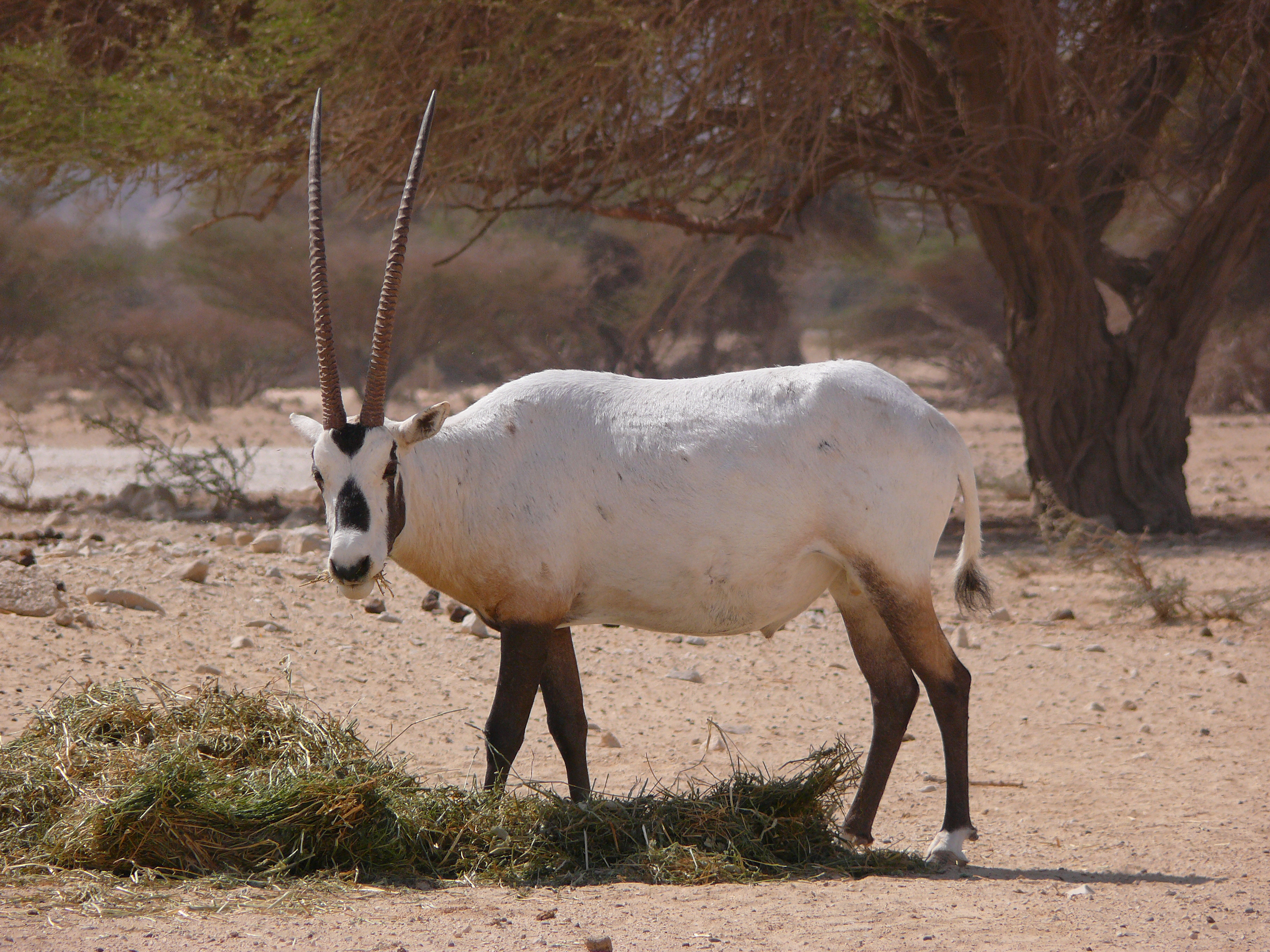
Arabian oryx in the Hai Bar Yotvata Desert Reserve, Israel

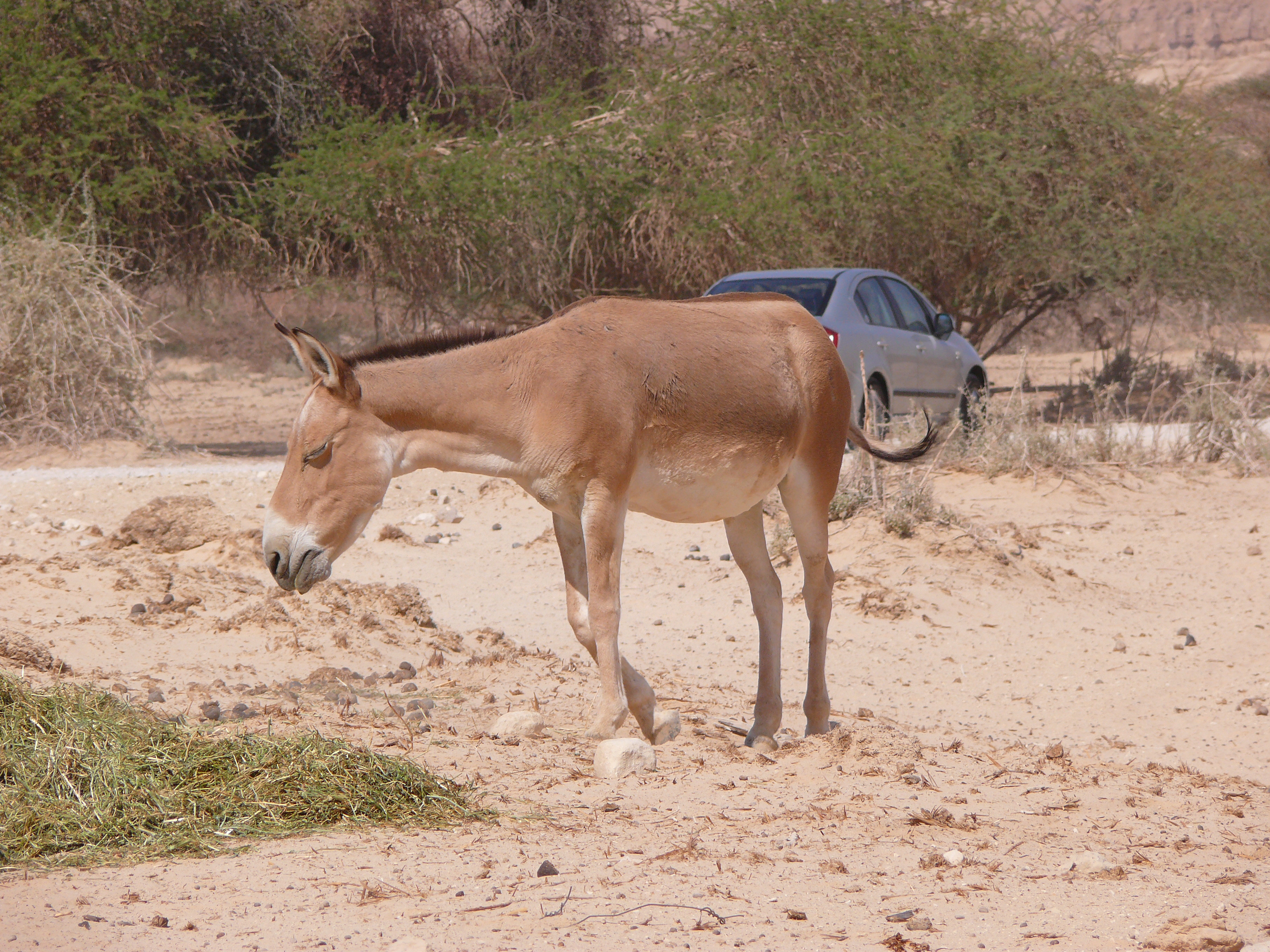
A Persian onager in southern Israel

The Arabian oryx disappeared from the southern deserts of the Levant and the Syrian Desert in the 19th century due to intensive hunting by Bedouins and recreational hunters, and by the 1930s the animal had disappeared from Jordan and was listed as globally endangered. The Arabian oryx was reintroduced to Israel in 1978, when a breeding program was established. The animals bred successfully in captivity until they reached 80 individuals in 1996, some of which were released in the Arabah Valley and the Negev. They subsequently reproduced naturally, reaching a population of approximately 100 by 2004. In 2009, the oryxes were repatriated to Jordan, with 20 animals being released in Wadi Rum. These animals were transported from Abu Dhabi in the United Arab Emirates. In Syria, a few herds of these animals reside in the fenced Tallila Reserve in a semi-wild state. The akhdar, or Asian wild donkey, inhabited the Syrian and Palestinian deserts in vast numbers for millennia. By 1927, the species had been completely extirpated from the region as a consequence of hunting, and two distinct breeds were present in the Levant, the Syrian breed, which is now extinct, and the Persian breed, which was reintroduced to Israel during the 1960s and 1980s. They were released in the Negev Desert in southern Israel, where more than 150 now live, and another herd was released in the Arabah Valley, and the animals have been reintroduced to Syria and Jordan. The Israeli environmental authorities have introduced the Maha Abu Adas and the African wild donkey to the Hai Bar Yotvata Desert Reserve, which specializes in breeding threatened desert wildlife, especially those mentioned in the Torah. These two species are likely to be among the animals mentioned in the Torah, which are said to have inhabited the land of Palestine. However, neither of these two species have been released into the wild until it is definitively confirmed that they are indeed among the mammals that inhabited the area in the past. Other mammals that became extinct in the Levant and have yet to be reintroduced include the hippopotamus, Asiatic cheetah,red deer, and Barbary sheep.

== Birds ==
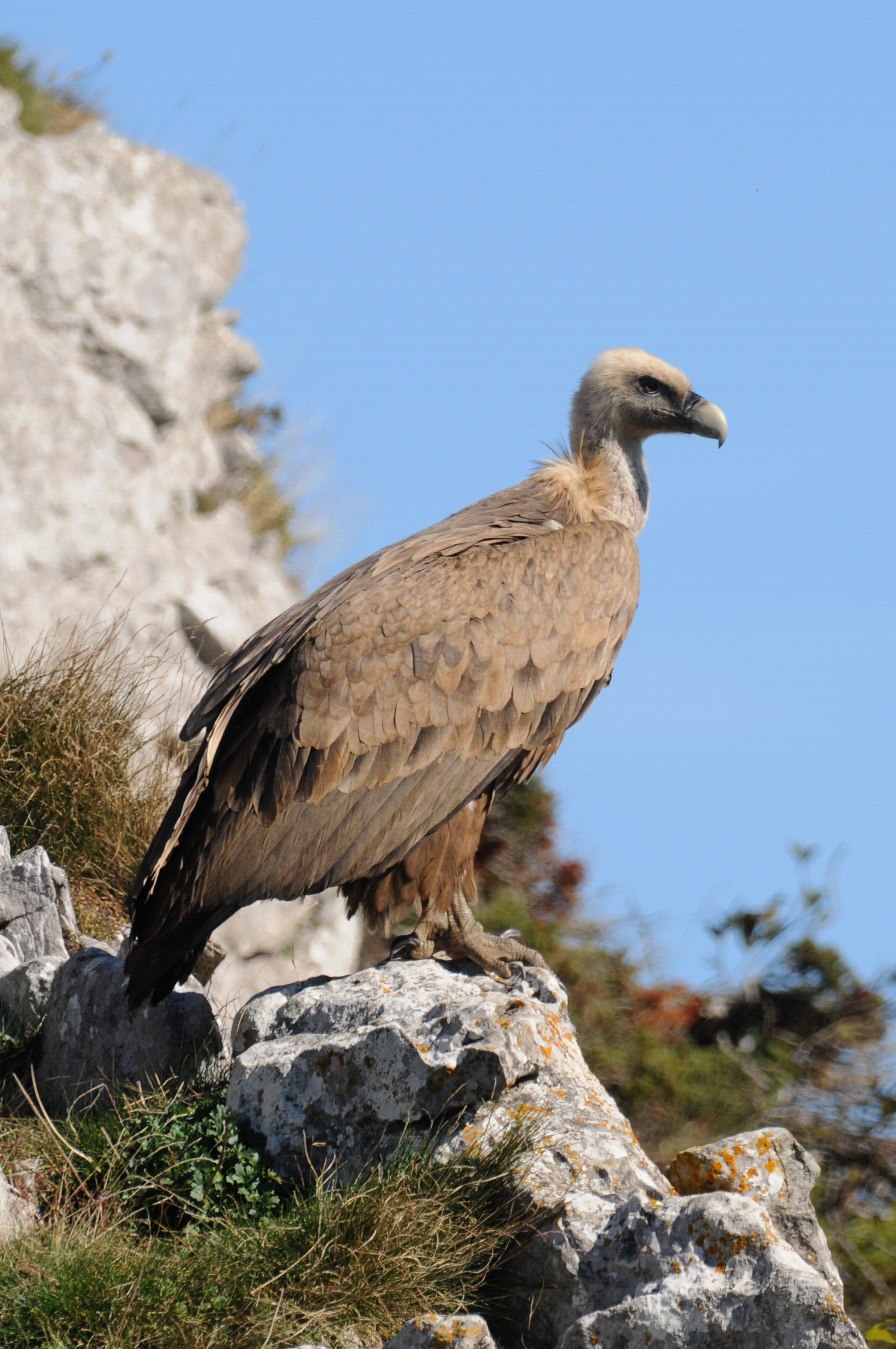
Eurasian vulture

Birds represent the most diverse group of Levantine animals, primarily due to the Levant's central location within the continents of the ancient world. This position facilitates the annual migration of thousands of species of birds from Europe to Africa and vice versa. The Levantine climatic and environmental diversity has enabled the establishment of a diverse range of bird species in this region. There are about 511 species of birds in the Levant, including migratory, transient and resident species, and one-fifth of these species are endangered.

=== Raptors ===
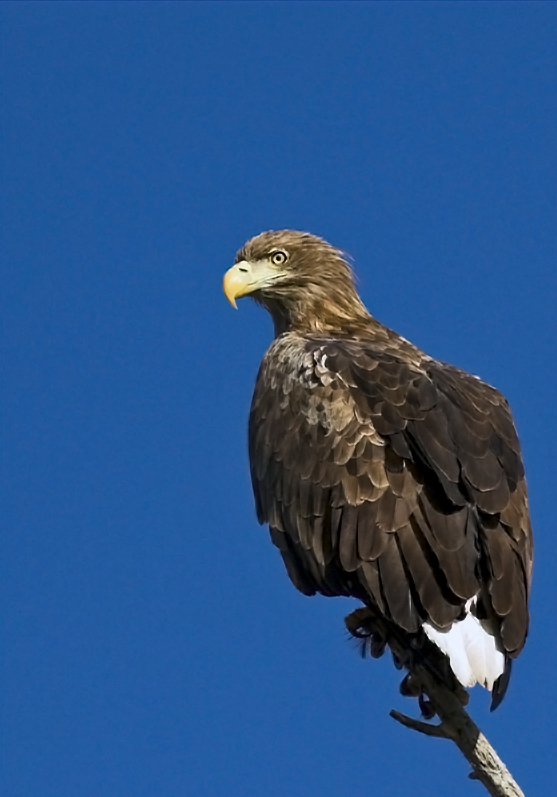
A white-tailed sea eagle

The Levant is home to a significant avian community, including vultures, eagles, falcons, hawks, and pigeons. Many of these species are well-documented in the writings of ancient Greek, Arab, and Roman scholars. A number of raptor species native to the Levant have become scarce or extinct as a result of unregulated hunting and other factors, including the pollution of natural habitats and the decline of prey species. One of the most conspicuous raptors in the Levant is the vulture, which is known as the bearded vulture or bone breaker. This is a large bird that once inhabited all parts of the Levant, from southern Palestine to Turkey and southern Europe. However, it is now rarely seen. One of the stories associated with it is one related to Shimon Peres and David Ben-Gurion, the ninth and first Israeli president and prime minister, respectively. It is reported that in 1945, a nest of these birds, known in Hebrew as Peres, was discovered in the Negev Desert. The individual in question, who was formerly known as Pirsky, was so taken with the birds that he changed his family name to Peres. The Eurasian griffon vulture is one of the most well-known Levantine raptors. However, like other raptors in this country, its numbers have declined dramatically due to hunting and intentional and unintentional poisoning by bullet and glass fragments throughout much of its habitat. These birds can still be observed in medium to large colonies in the Golan, Carmel, Negev, Chouf, and the Levantine desert, where they feed on the remains of predators and the carcasses of sheep and cows discarded by farmers. There have been several attempts to propagate these birds and reintroduce them to their former natural habitats. The Levant is also home to the two largest species in the Old World vulture family, namely the bald eagle and the gray eagle, known as the monk eagle. The first species is common in southern Palestine and rare in the northern Mediterranean part of the Levant. It can be distinguished from other Levantine vultures by the fleshy appendages hanging from its face. Some Israeli experts posit that the return of these eagles to nest in northern Israel, and thus the rest of the Levant, is contingent on their conservation and prevention of hunting. It is evident that they previously nested in these areas, but have since ceased doing so due to the unregulated hunting and poisoning of livestock by livestock breeders. Black vultures are still more prevalent throughout the entire Levant, and can often be observed in large groups feeding on a single carcass. These vultures are migratory birds, with the majority not breeding in the Levant.

Another rare and distinctive raptor in the Levant is the white-tailed eagle, a very large bird that inhabited the region until the 1950s. Its population declined significantly due to deliberate poisoning by livestock farmers and farmers who perceived it as a threat to their livelihoods. Subsequently, some environmentalists in Israel have advocated for the captive breeding and subsequent release of the first pair into the wild in the Carmel Mountains in 2007. The birds perished shortly thereafter from consuming a poisoned carcass placed by a farmer, yet the propagation and reintroduction project persists. Other common eagles in the Levant include the lesser spotted eagle, which has an estimated population in the tens of thousands, as well as golden eagles, eastern eagle kings, cheeky eagles, and steppe eagles.

The Levant is home to numerous other lesser raptors, the majority of which are migratory. These birds can be observed in the spring and fall, when they form vast flocks. They play a pivotal role in maintaining the Levantine ecosystem, as they prey upon agricultural pests, including rats, hares, insects, and mice. By controlling their numbers, these birds provide a valuable service to farmers. Some of these small raptors: black hawks, Eurasian sparrowhawk, pipistrelles, common nuthatches, peregrine falcon, falcons, hoverflies, and more.

=== Seabirds ===
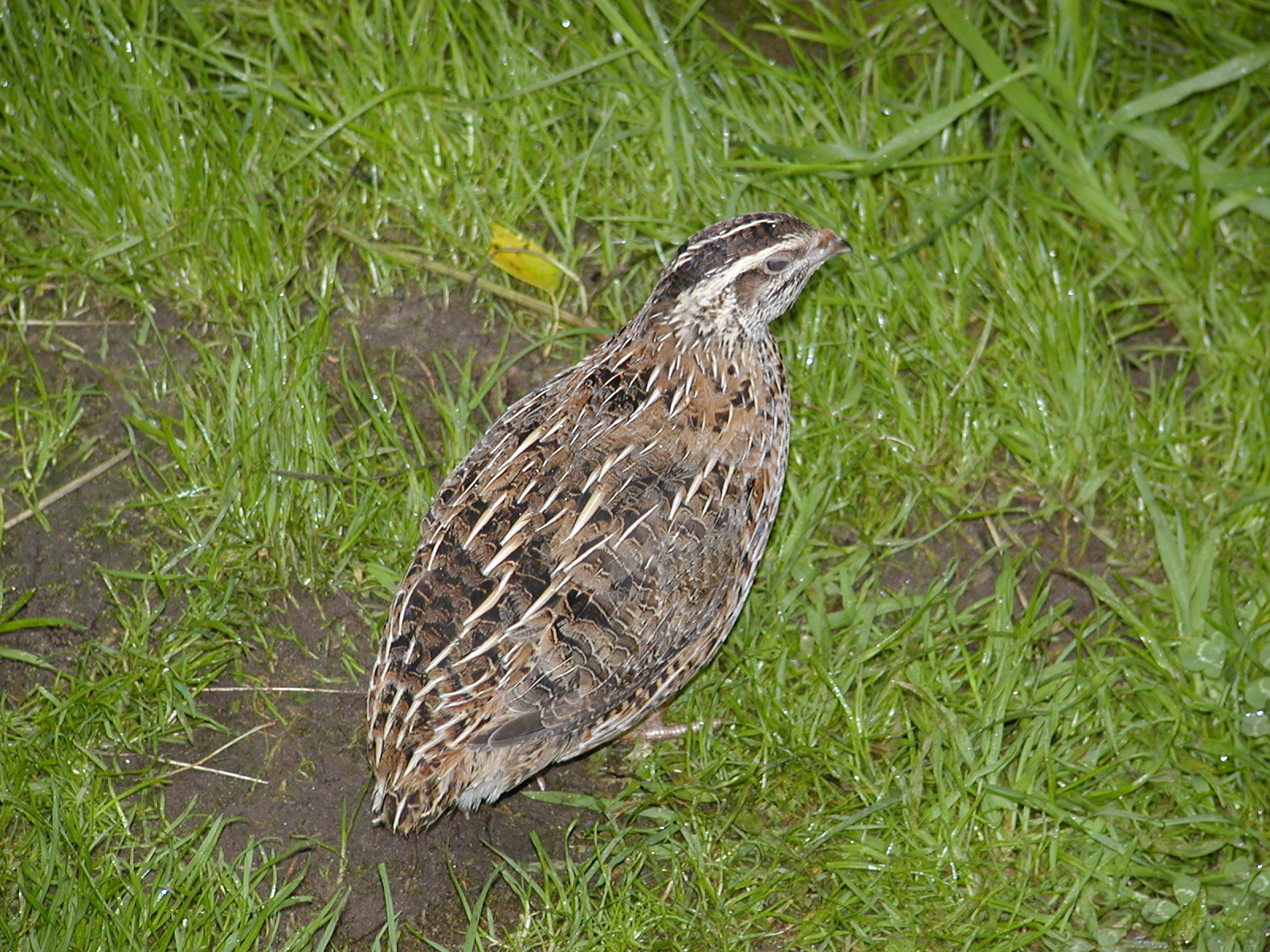
Quail

The Levant is home to numerous species of gulls, terns, and cranes, the majority of which are migratory. One of the most conspicuous seabirds in the Levant is the white-eyed gull, which is a resident of the Red Sea hatchery and can be observed throughout the year in the Gulf of Aqaba, where it forms roosting flocks on the beaches. Seabirds in the Levant face a multitude of threats, with the most significant being the depletion of fish stocks due to seawater pollution.

=== Seabirds and prey ===
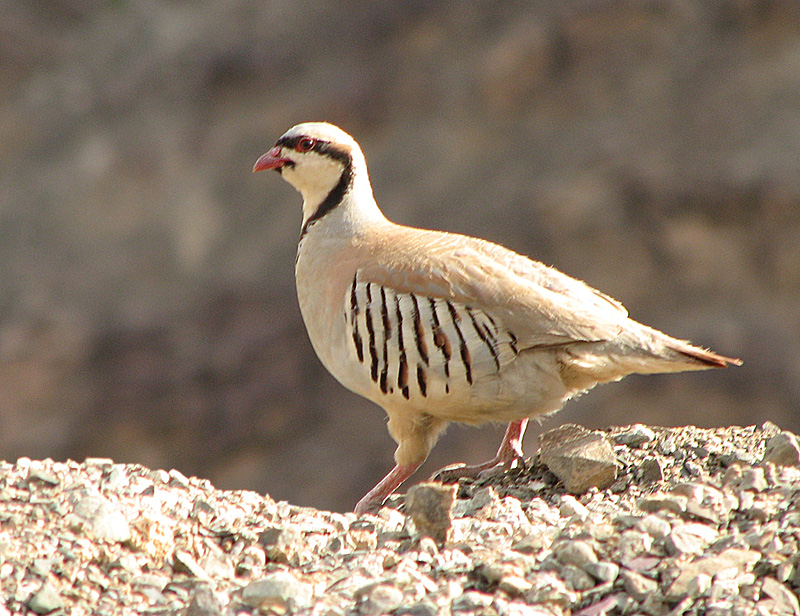
Partridge

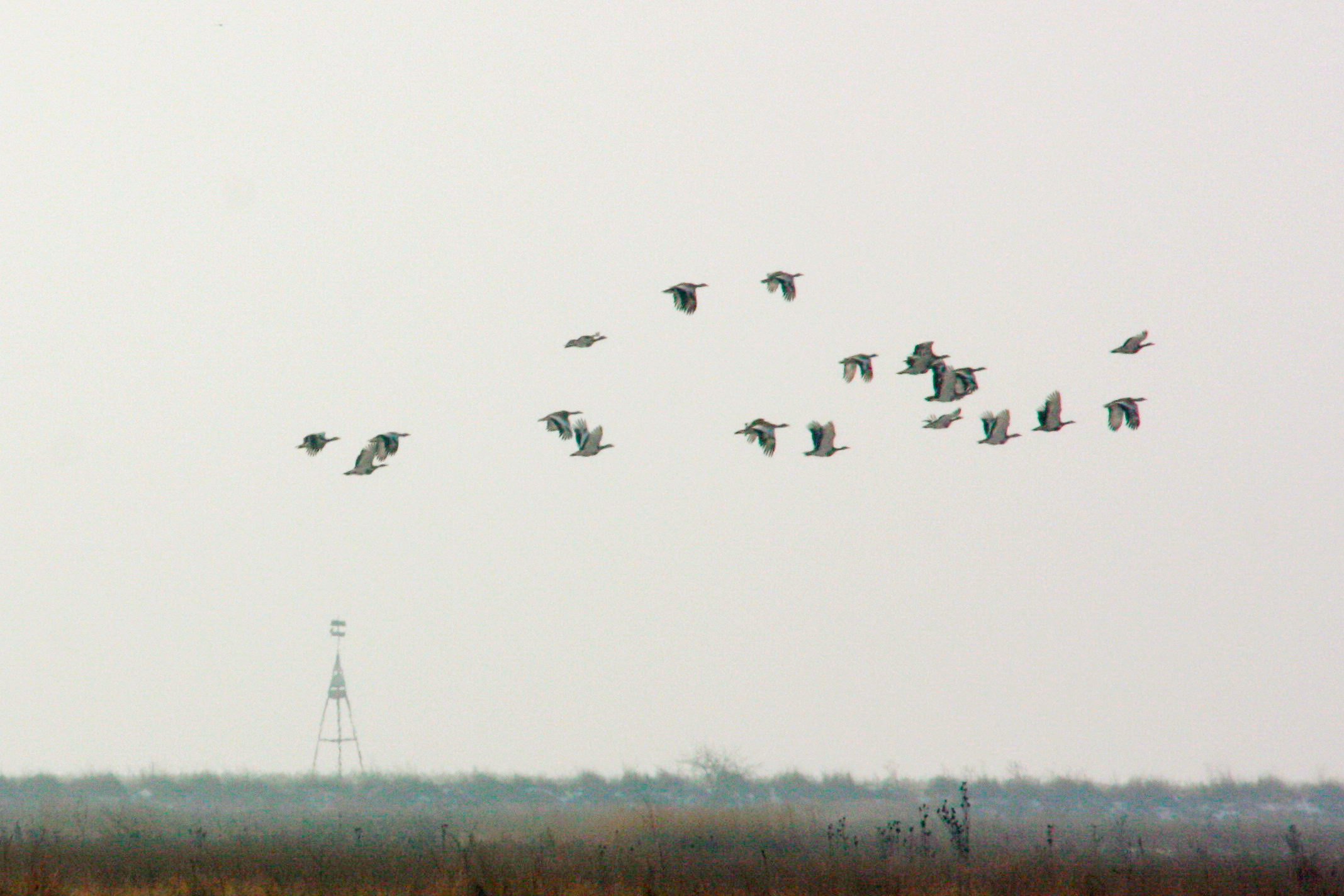
Great bustards cross the Romanian sky heading to the Levant

Four species of prey birds, or ground birds, are native to the Levant. Two others have been introduced for the purpose of hunting. Of these, the common partridge is the most common and widespread throughout the country. The species inhabits a variety of habitats, including orchards, fields, vineyards, mountain meadows, forests, steppes, and deserts. However, it is absent in the far south and east, where water sources are scarce and the majority of the vegetation that these birds require for feeding and shading has been eliminated. The sand partridge replaces the common partridge in desert areas. However, it is also widespread in the northern parts of the Levant up to the Turkish border. The reason it is common in the desert is because it is more adapted to its harsh life. Its sandy color helps it to hide, and it is able to survive for long periods without water and fly further distances in search of it. The black pheasant is a distinctive bird that is widely distributed throughout the Mediterranean part of the Levant. It can be distinguished from other Levantine land birds by the glossy black color of the male's breast and head feathers. Its range extends from the western shore of the Dead Sea to Lake Houla, encompassing the Beqaa Valley, Mount Lebanon, inland and coastal Syria. It is often found in flat areas with canopy trees near sabkhas. The last of the Levant's native game species, the common quail, is locally known as salwa. It is the only migratory prey species, with only a small number of individuals remaining resident. These birds are a tempting target for hunters, due to the large numbers that cross the Levant every year. Their flocks are constantly pursued, resulting in the death of many birds. Nevertheless, they remain abundant and constitute a significant food source for Levantine predators. They can be observed in a variety of habitats, including mountain slopes and hillsides, plains, and canopy woodlands. These birds hold significant symbolic value for Jews and Muslims, as they are referenced in both the Torah and the Quran. As they believe that God sent them to the Israelites when they were experiencing hunger after leaving Egypt.

The Levant is home to three types of houbara: McQueen's houbara, little houbara, and great houbara. The first is the rarest, as it is mainly a desert bird, living in open deserts with brush and short grasses, and can be found in the center and north of the Negev Desert and Arabah Valley. The houbara, a rare winter visitor, crosses from Europe to Africa. It can be observed in the Mediterranean region of the Levant, including the Syrian coast, Lebanon, and northern Israel. It inhabits open grasslands. The great bustard, the heaviest bird capable of flight, is a rare winter visitor, and can be observed primarily in the same areas as its smaller relative.

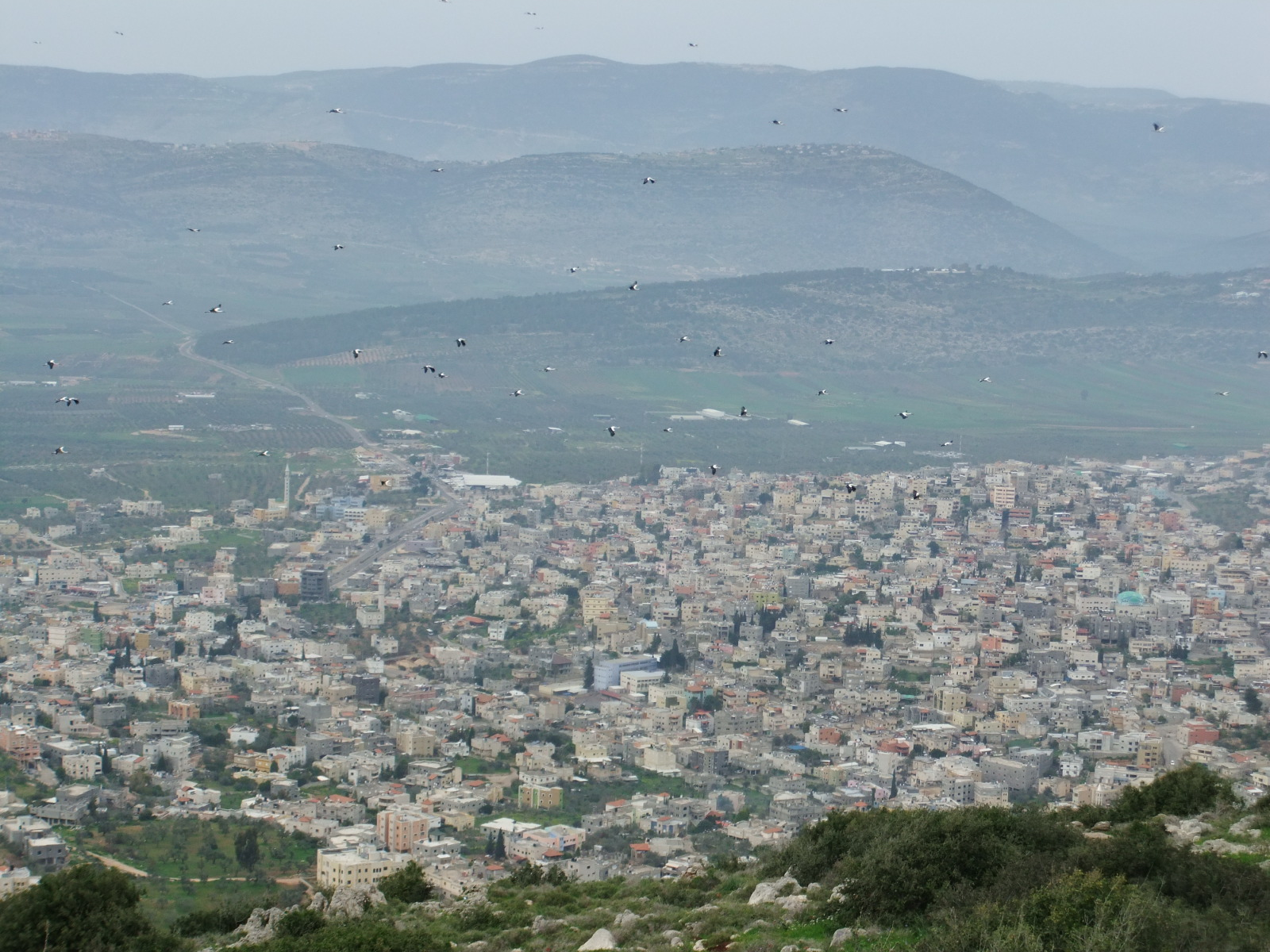
A flock of white storks crosses the sky over the village of Arabah in Palestine.

A number of species of waders have established their habitats in the Levant, including: The common hen of the water, furfur, water rooster, black grouse, and several species and heron are among the birds that inhabit the region. The latter has a very diverse community in the Levant, but the majority of individuals are migratory, with only two species breeding, the little wak and the black-crowned night-eagle. The remaining species either traverse the country or remain in the southern regions during the winter, subsequently migrating northward.

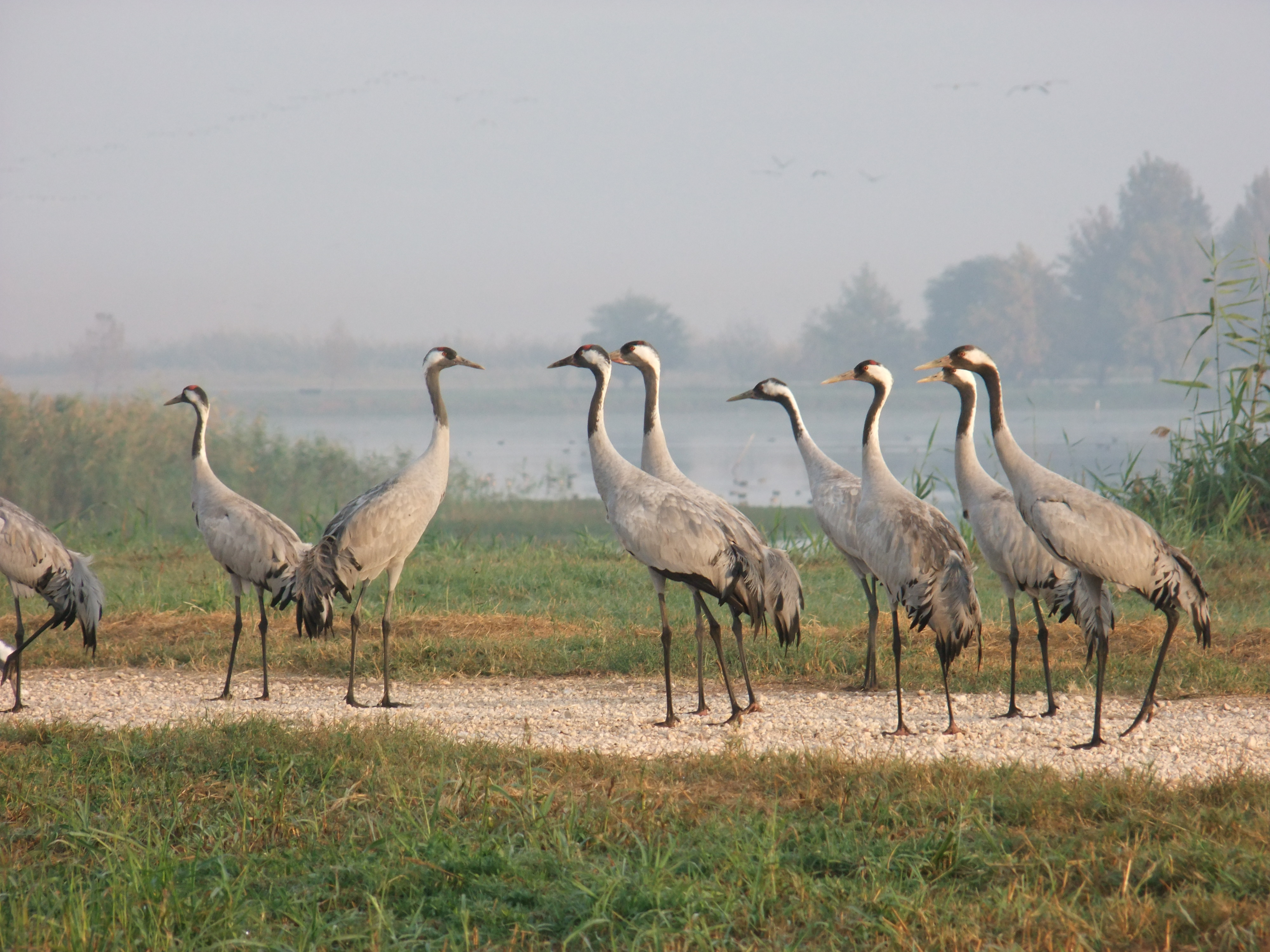
A flock of cranes in Lake Hula

Among the most conspicuous migratory waders traversing the Levant are two species of storks. The two species of stork are the white stork and the black stork. Each spring, thousands of white and black storks traverse the Levant. The migration of storks is one of the most spectacular natural phenomena in the Levant, and it is believed that the vast majority of the Eastern European population of these birds crosses the Levant each spring. They stop for a short rest before continuing their journey through the Nile Valley to the southern Sahara. Some flocks of these birds have caused fatal air accidents, with several individuals crashing into several Israeli warplanes and getting stuck in their engines, causing them to crash. Another prolific visitor to the Levant is the familiar crane. Like the storks, these birds use the Levantine marshes as a resting place to refresh themselves. Perhaps the best place to see them is Lake Hula in northern Israel, where thousands of these birds gather each year to feed on the vegetable and grain scraps that farmers throw at them. It has been observed that a significant proportion of these birds have been spending the entire winter in and around the lake, rather than continuing on to Africa, where they are guaranteed to find shelter and food. Additionally, the Levant is traversed by two species of flamingos, including the greater flamingo and lesser flamingo. Three are also three species of swans, cormorants, 35 species of ducks and geese, with only one being an exotic species, the Egyptian goose.

=== Columbidae ===
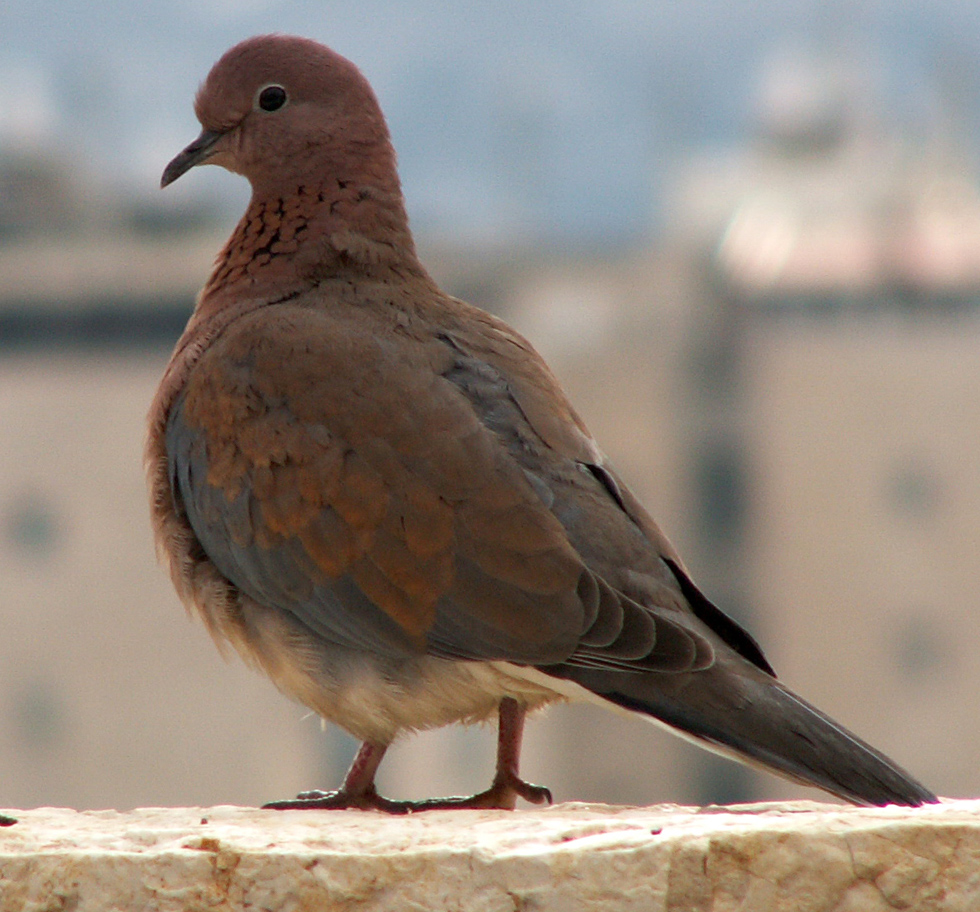
A laughing dove from Jerusalem

The Levant is home to a diverse range of pigeons, including migratory and breeding populations. The Turanian pigeon, the immediate ancestor of the domesticated pigeon, is the most prominent species of the Levantine pigeon. Fossils indicate that this species originated and evolved in Southwest Asia, where a few skeletons and fossilized remains have been found in Israel. These findings suggest that the pigeons originated in the region approximately 300,000 years ago. Levantine Turanian doves are not confined to the wild form in the Levant. Indeed, several feral populations are also to be found in the countryside and cities. Other species of pigeons native to the Levant include the European turtle dove, Levantine lunar, Eurasian collared dove, African ringed dove, and laughing dove. Perhaps the most distinctive member of the Levantine pigeon family is the Namaqua dove. These diminutive birds measure only 22 centimeters in length, with a long, protruding tail. They are endemic to southern Israel, where they are found in arid habitats with acacia trees. Two species of parrots were introduced to the Levant by humans, resulting in their accidental establishment in the region. They are the pink-collared parakeet and the monk parakeet. These two species were introduced for the cage bird trade, but some escaped captivity and live a wild life in the wild. They quickly adapted to the local climate and multiplied.

Additionally, the Levant is home to four species of cuckoos and several species of owls. Among these, the brown fish owl is particularly noteworthy. It is one of the few owls that live almost exclusively on fish, including a single breed, the western breed, which some researchers have proposed as a distinct species. It is possible that the owls in question have become extinct in the Levant due to habitat destruction and shrinkage. The Levant is home to a single species of woodpecker, the Syrian woodpecker. This species is similar in appearance to the great spotted woodpecker of Europe, and can be easily confused with it, distinguished only by its longer beak and the absence of white on its tail. Additionally, three types of warblers are known to inhabit the Levantine lands, the European bee-eater, the blue-cheeked warbler, and the green warbler.

=== Passerine ===
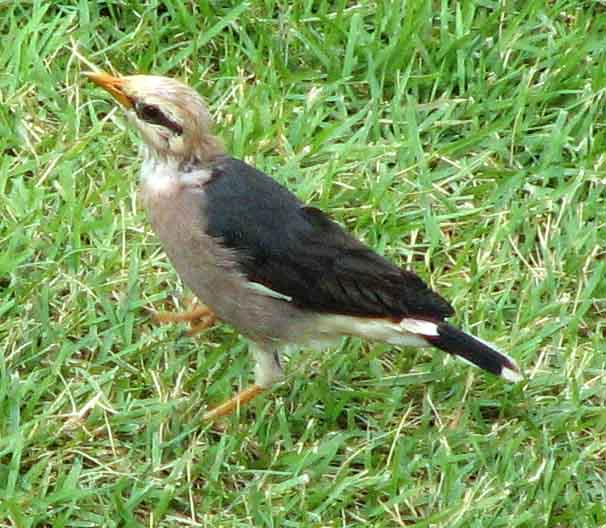
A russet-breasted starling in Israel

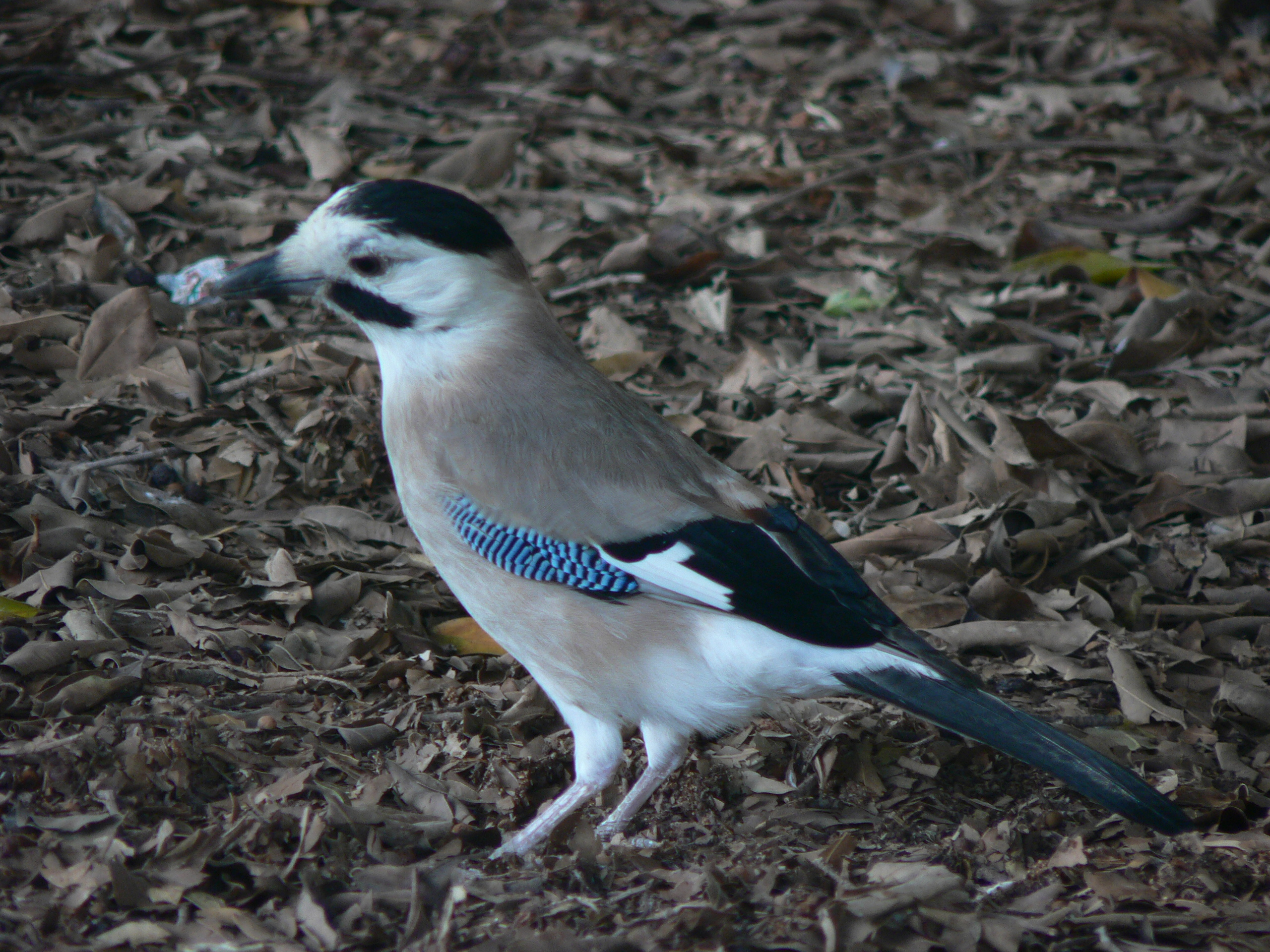
An Eurasian jay in Israel

The Levantine passerine birds (Passeriformes) are noted for their diversity. The most numerous members of this order are in the raven family, which comprises 10 species in the Levant. The most notable of these are the hooded crow and the carrion crow. The hooded crow was considered a subspecies of the carrion crow until 2002 when it was elevated to species status. These highly intelligent and highly adaptable birds can be found in almost all natural habitats in the Levant, including urban areas. The Eurasian cuckoo is one of the most significant avian species in the Levantine ecosystem, as it feeds on the nuts of walnuts, oaks, and pines. They bury a substantial number of these nuts to feed on during winter, with many of these nuts eventually growing into trees. The most aesthetically pleasing of the genus Fringilla is the Palestine sunbird, renowned for its glossy plumage and mellifluous song. It is a small bird that inhabits arid regions up to an altitude of 3200 meters. These small birds consume insects and flower nectar. Some Palestinian officials have proposed that they be designated as the national bird of the State of Palestine. Some of the most prolific passerines in the Levantine are the European goldfinch, the house sparrow, and Sturnus, a genus of starlings. Sturnus, in particular, are an important food source for many predators. Two species of non-native passerines have been introduced to the Levant by humans, the myna and the russet-breasted starling; their current population is thought to have descended from a few birds that escaped from captivity in a Tel Aviv bird park during the last two decades of the 20th century.

=== Extinct birds ===
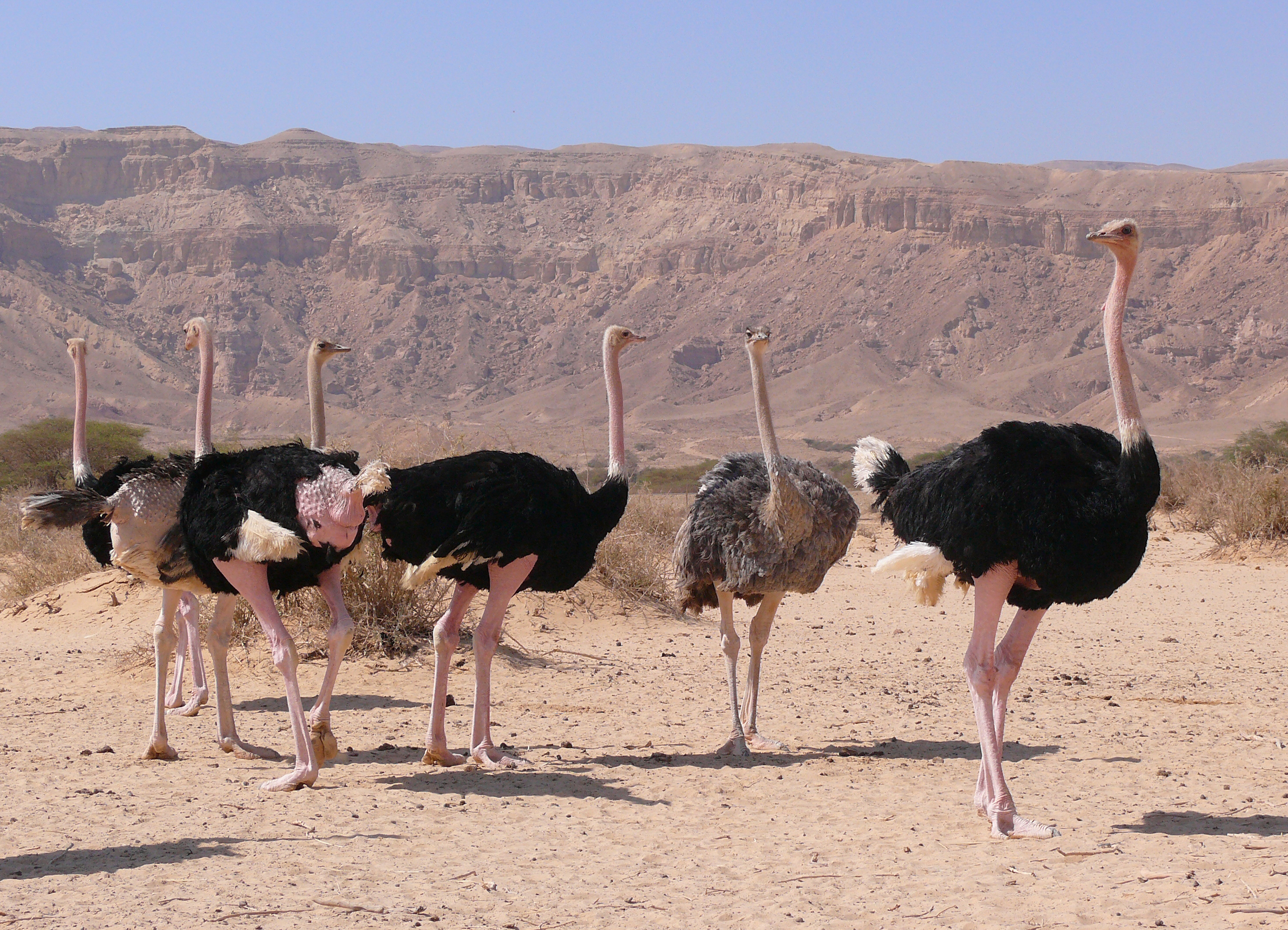
A flock of red-necked ostriches in the Hai Bar Yotvata Desert Reserve

The IUCN Red List describes two species of birds as extinct in the Levant. One species has disappeared in Syria, Lebanon, Israel, the Palestinian territories, and Jordan, while the other still crosses Syria in small numbers. The ostrich was once a common sight in the Levant, particularly in the region's flat plains. The Levantine ostrich was of the Syrian or Arabian breed, which was also prevalent in the Arabian Peninsula and Iraq. Like the large mammals, these creatures were relentlessly hunted until they were extirpated from the region in 1966. Ostriches were reintroduced to southern Israel as part of a project to bring biblical animals back to Palestine. Several North African red-necked ostriches, the closest to the Arabian breed, were bred at the Hai Bar Yotvata Desert Wildlife Sanctuary, and a few individuals were released into the wild.

The northern bald ibis was once a common sight in the Levant, occurring in semi-desert areas and in the mountains. However, their numbers have declined significantly in recent times, due to the loss of their natural habitat, which has been reclaimed for agriculture and construction, and the poisoning of their food sources by pesticides. Scientists subsequently corroborated this hypothesis following the discovery of three deceased birds of this species in the Jordanian desert. These birds were observed to be migrating southward from Turkey. Local inhabitants held the belief that these birds were responsible for guiding the caravans of pilgrims, and as a result, they were surrounded by an aura of piety and reverence throughout history. Two remaining populations of these birds are currently known to exist in southern Turkey and northern Syria. The first of these populations is thought to migrate through inner Syria to the Arabian Peninsula and the Horn of Africa. However, it is believed that these birds are critically endangered and almost extinct. In response, the Syrian Ministry of Agriculture has placed these birds under absolute protection and their natural habitats, and banned hunting and trafficking in any form. Experts posit that the migration of Turkish birds through Syria will contribute to the genetic diversity of the two populations.

== Reptiles and amphibians ==
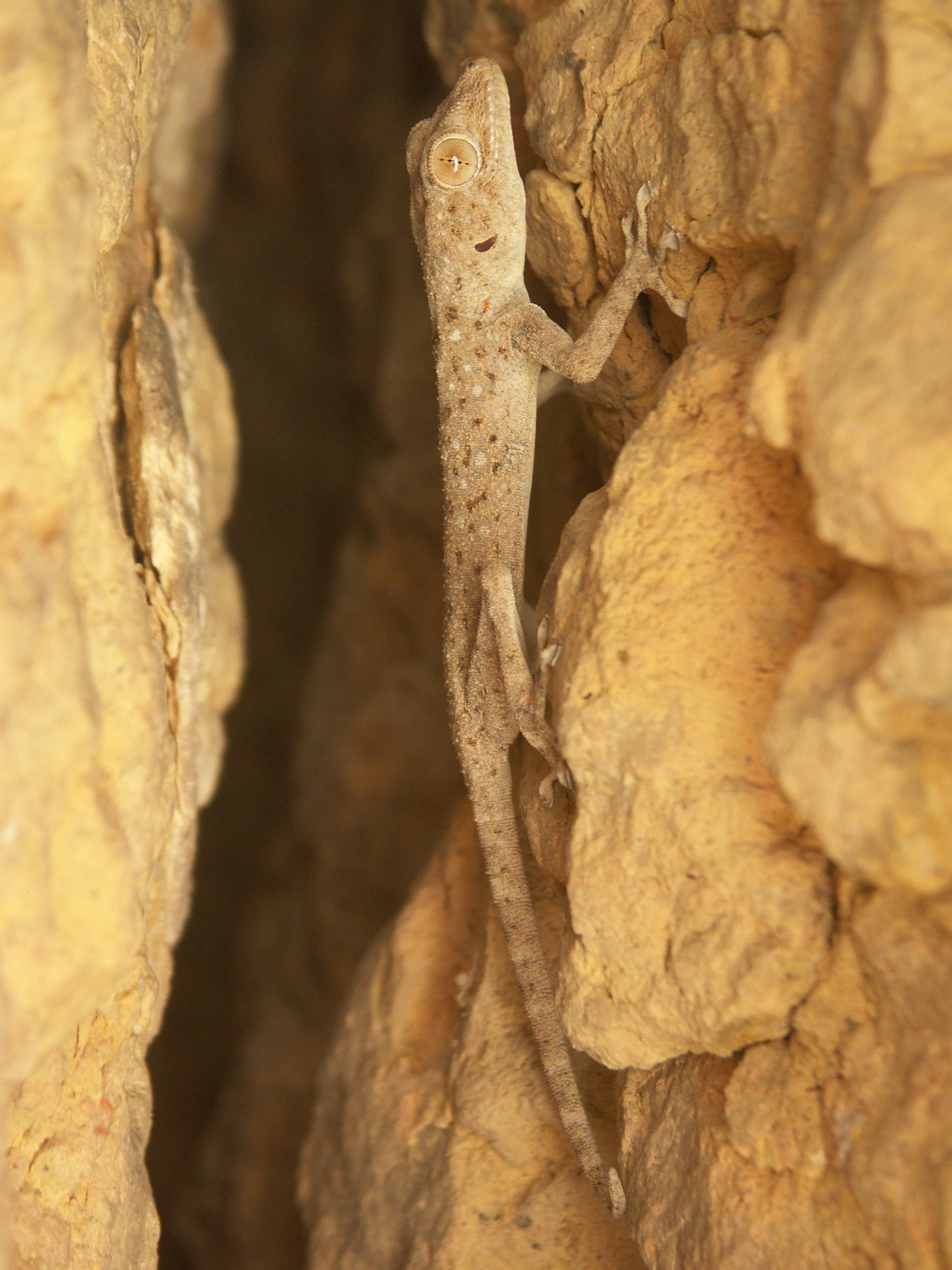
A broad-toed gecko in Dana Reserve, Jordan

The Levant is home to over a hundred species of reptiles, with the majority inhabiting arid regions and a smaller number residing in temperate Mediterranean areas. The extinction rate of reptiles in the Levant is relatively low, as the majority are at a stable population level. Past extinctions, at the beginning of the 20th century, include the Nile crocodile, the European pond lizard, and Oriental praying snakes. Reptiles alien to the Levant include the red-eared pond weasel and the coarse-tailed gecko.

Since the beginning of the 20th century, there has been a precipitous decline in the population of Levantine amphibians, largely due to the drainage of numerous marshes for land reclamation. Of the six species of amphibians native to Palestine, only one is not currently threatened. The number of species has declined since the inception of Jewish settlement. This was facilitated by the drainage of the majority of the northern marshes, which enabled the cultivation of the land and the construction of settlements. One amphibian species, the Hula painted frog, has become extinct as a consequence of these activities. Despite the assertion by some herpetologists in Lebanon that these frogs continue to inhabit a deep swamp at the base of Mount Barouk in the Beqaa Valley, no specimens have been discovered to date.

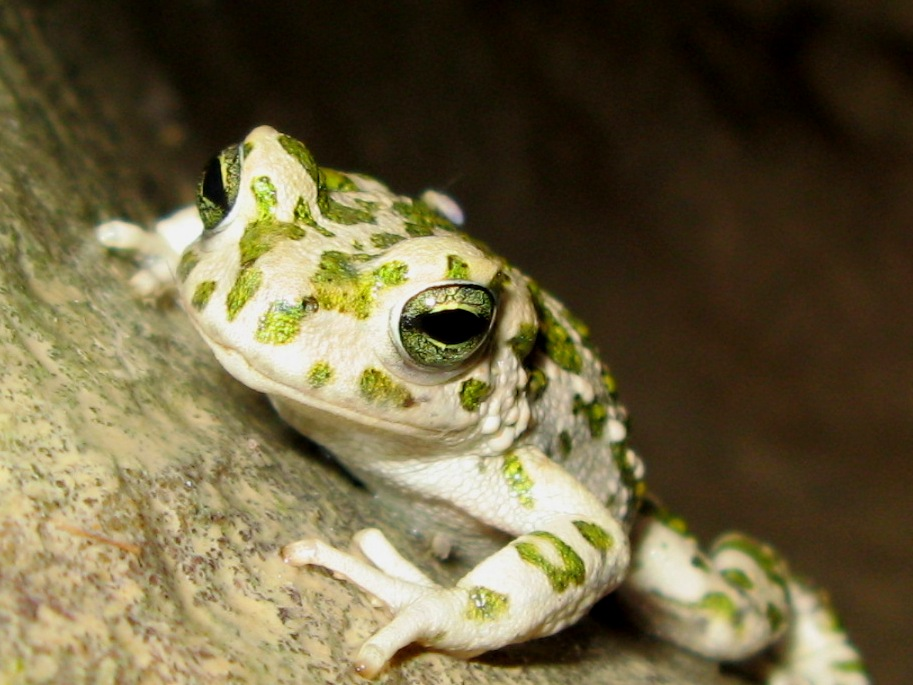
A female green toad in Jordan

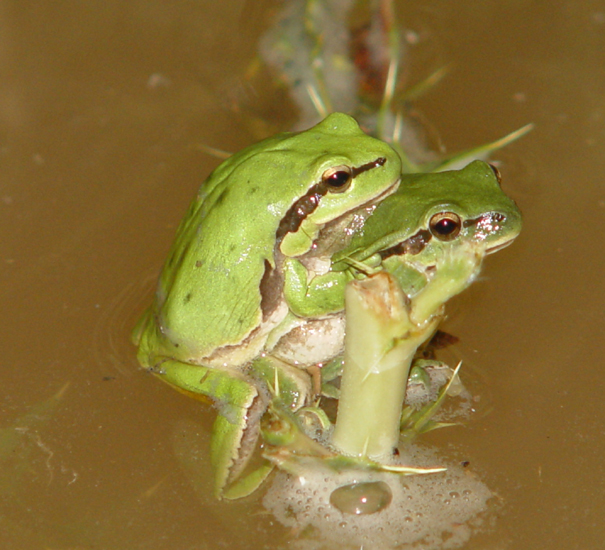
Two oriental tree frogs mating

The list of Levantine amphibians includes, the European swamp frog, eastern tree frog, European green toad, eastern hollow-footed toad, fire salamander, and southern striped newt. All of which are endangered species. The eastern hollow-footed toad and southern striped newt are also critically endangered. The European green toad is the most widespread amphibian of the Levant, occurring in almost all Mediterranean coastal areas. Its presence is associated with permanent sources of water, although some populations are spreading to drier areas. A 55% decline in the spawning grounds of these amphibians has been observed in Israel, despite their continued prevalence. This decline is likely due to the impact of water pollution and the isolation of habitats through road and railroad construction. The shovel-footed eastern amaranth is endemic to the coastal region of Israel, extending from the northern border with Lebanon to the northernmost point of the country, near the city of Haifa. It is locally extinct in Jordan. Several hundred of these animals remain in Israel and Lebanon. The decline in their numbers can be attributed to the fragmentation and destruction of their natural habitats. In Israel, these animals are afforded full legal protection. The striped water sandal is distributed throughout the entire Mediterranean coastal region of the Levant, extending from the Turkish border to Ashkelon. Its preferred habitat is spring ponds. It is notable that some populations of this species were previously distributed as far south as Ashkelon. However, they have disappeared due to the contamination of the local waterways. The timing of the mating season varies depending on the habitat of the species in question. In the coastal region, the season runs from January to February, while in the Galilee, it extends from February to March. In Israel, they are fully legally protected as they are critically endangered, with only 5% of the population that existed in the 1950s remaining. Levantine fire salamanders are readily distinguishable from their European counterparts by their longer legs and toes, as well as their more rounded heads. Despite their rarity in the Levant, their current numbers are stable. Swamp frogs are found predominantly in ponds and marshes. The Levantine populations are smaller and lighter than the European populations. Eastern tree frogs are the most common Levantine amphibians, although their natural habitat has been reduced. They are distributed throughout the country, with populations extending as far north as the Negev and as far south as the Dead Sea. The population of tree frogs native to the Levant is estimated to number in the thousands.

== Other creatures ==
=== Fish ===
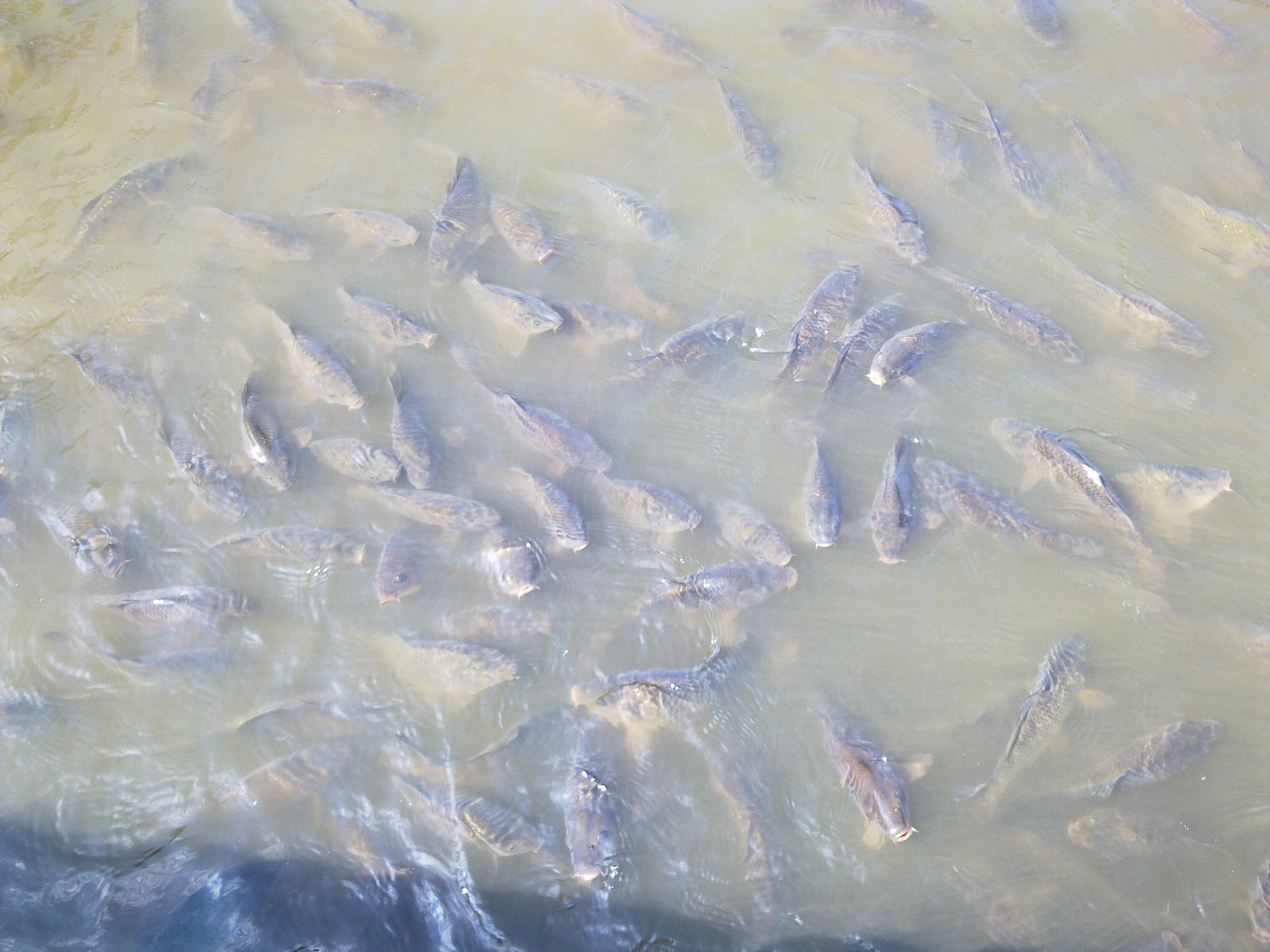
A shoal of common carp, a species of fish native to the Levant.

The Levant is home to a considerable number of fish, with over 1,728 species documented. Of these, approximately 410 species are found in the Mediterranean Sea, while 1,270 species inhabit the Red Sea. The remaining are freshwater fish, and their numbers have declined significantly due to the draining and pollution of lakes and marshes. Some species, such as the Yarkon bream, are extinct in the wild, while others, such as the Hula bream, are completely extinct. The last sighting of the latter was recorded in 1975. The extinction of Hula bream was because they were found only in Lake Hula, much of which was drained to cultivate the land. In the western mountain range of Lebanon, scientists have discovered and continue to uncover numerous species of fossilized fish. The most notable locations of these fossils are in the vicinity of the ancient city of Byblos.

=== Invertebrates ===
The Levant is home to more than 30,000 species of invertebrates, including approximately 22,500 species of insects and 3,900 species of other arthropods. The list of Levantine invertebrates includes numerous mollusks, including 230 terrestrial species, 850 species inhabiting the Mediterranean Sea, and 1,120 species in the Red Sea. Insects are distributed throughout the Levantine ecoregions, with the majority inhabiting temperate Mediterranean regions. Those found in the Levant belong to 27 of the 29 known orders.

== Protecting Levantine wildlife ==
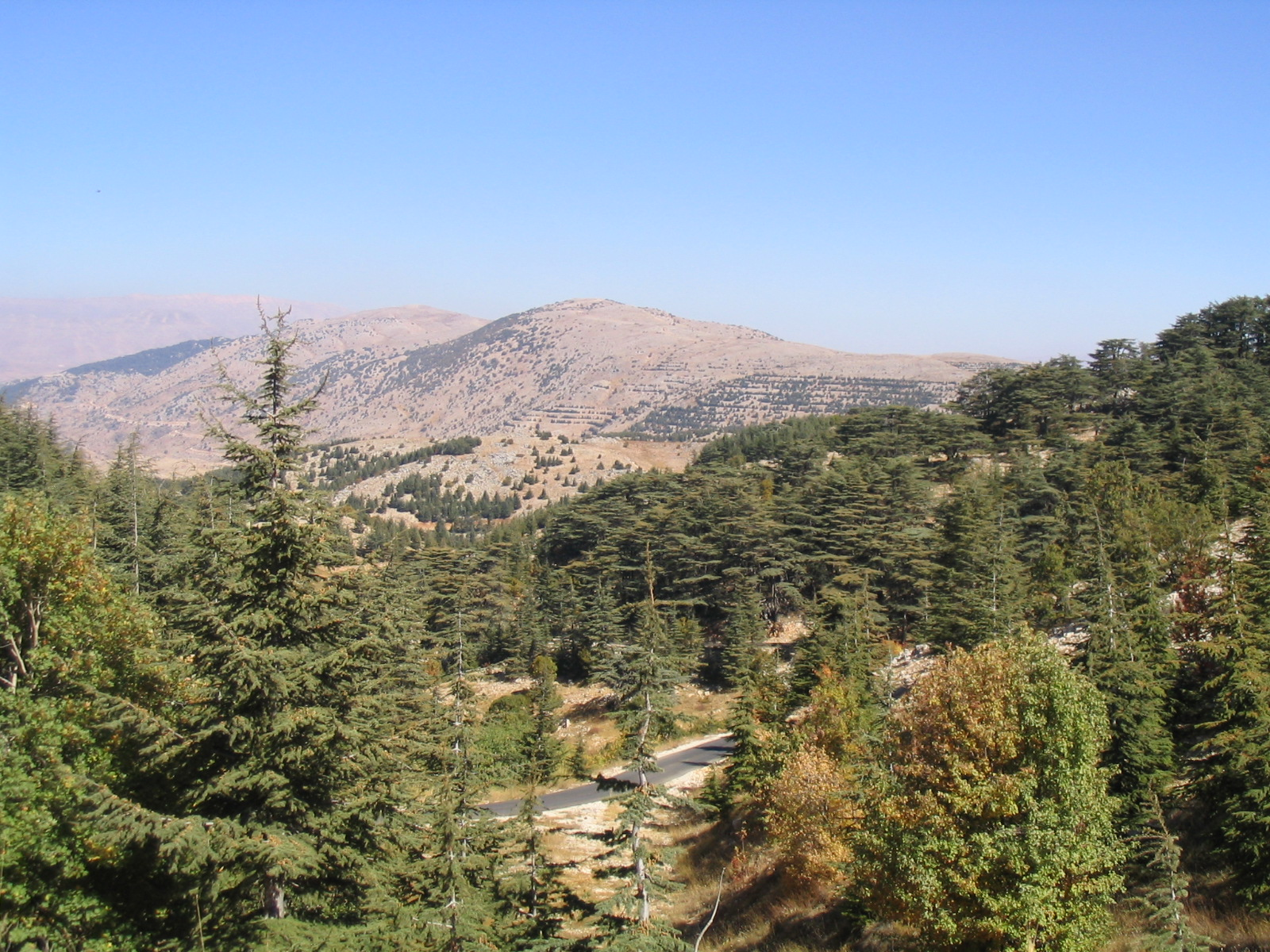
Baroque Mountains, Shouf Cedar Reserve

Since the partition of the Ottoman Empire, several prominent nature reserves have been established by Levantine governments. Some of these reserves have been successful in preserving animals and saving them from local extinction. Others have managed to preserve wildlife to a lesser extent, as violations of their sanctity have been commonplace. Additionally, numerous private wildlife protection organizations rely on donations from animal and nature enthusiasts, as well as other philanthropists.

=== Lebanon ===
The Wildlife Protection Society of Lebanon (WPSL) was established in 1986 and received its license from the Ministry of the Interior by Decree No. 6 dated 8 January 1986. The association's objective is to safeguard the environment and biodiversity in Lebanon. It is also an international partner of the BirdLife International. The organization pays special attention to birds because, according to experts, their status indicates how well a country's ecosystem is thriving. As a member of the International Union for Conservation of Nature (IUCN), the organization has played a pivotal role in the development and establishment of Lebanon's Protected Areas Project (PAP). Additionally, it has conducted extensive research in several Lebanese regions, with the objective of identifying the most prominent sites where migratory and native birds take refuge. The program was successful in fostering environmental awareness among the local population, particularly among farmers and peasants, who have the most direct contact with wildlife.

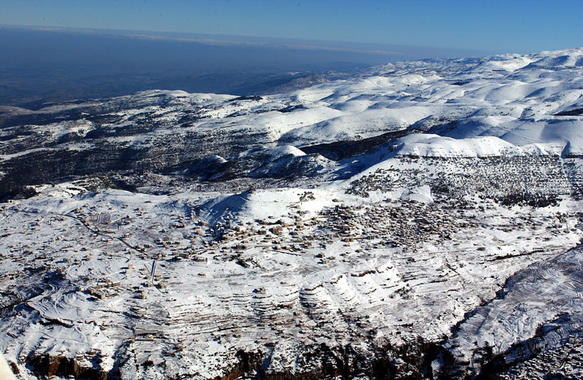
An aerial view of the Ehden Forest Reserve during winter

In addition to the aforementioned association, the oldest wildlife conservation organization in Lebanon, the Arusha Lebanon Environment Association, was founded in 1996 to preserve wildlife and protect the environment. However, its primary mission remains the preservation of the waters of the Amik swamps from drying out, which are one of the most significant remaining freshwater swamps in Lebanon and one of the few in the Middle East. The organization's unwavering commitment to the preservation of these marshes has resulted in the avoidance of degradation and the continued provision of a safe habitat for migratory birds. In addition to its work in the swamps, Arusha Lebanon conducts scientific studies, hands-on conservation of natural resources, and educational programs on behalf of government institutions, nature reserves, and international conservation organizations. The primary accomplishment of this association is the regeneration of arid agricultural regions and their transformation into wetlands conducive to the growth of living organisms. A number of drainage channels were closed, which helped trap more water. Four new ponds were dug to provide areas where water is permanently present. Following negotiations with farmers, a program was established to prevent work in sensitive areas of the marshes. The implementation of this program involved the construction of stone dividers, the installation of gates, and the excavation of small channels. These measures were designed to restrict fishing and the access of large vehicles to the marshes. Finally, the number of sheep in the area has been reduced, and certain areas have been designated for grazing within a marshland-use regime. With regard to governmental efforts, Lebanon has three "model" reserves established by ministerial decrees in 1996: Al-Shouf Cedar Reserve, Ehden Forest Reserve, and Palm Islands Nature Reserve. There are also several smaller reserves, including Batnaal Reserve, Tannourine Cedar Reserve, Yamouna Reserve, Gammoua Forest Reserve, and Tyre Beach Reserve.

=== Israel ===
In 1986, the American Society for the Protection of Nature in Israel (ASPNI) was established to disseminate information about environmental issues to the public. Since its inception, the ASPNI has been continuously operational, thus becoming the oldest wildlife society in the country. At the governmental level, the Israel Environment and National Parks Authority (ENPA) is responsible for maintaining and protecting the country's ecosystems and biodiversity. Additionally, it plays an educational role, informing farmers of the importance of preserving natural resources for future generations. ENPA was established in 1963 following the Knesset's resolution to form a body to preserve the remaining forests and deserts before they are overtaken by human activity. The authority established a substantial number of reserves in Israel, the first of which was Hula Nature Reserve, which opened in 1964. In the following years, the lands were rehabilitated to make them suitable for the vast numbers of birds migrating across the Levant. This reserve has been a significant success in preserving migratory and resident birds, as well as fish, insects, and mammals. The success of the reserve led to the establishment of a population of migratory birds that remain in the area throughout the spring and fall, rather than continuing their journey south to Africa. This phenomenon was particularly pronounced following the encouragement of farmers to continuously throw grains and vegetables to feed the birds.

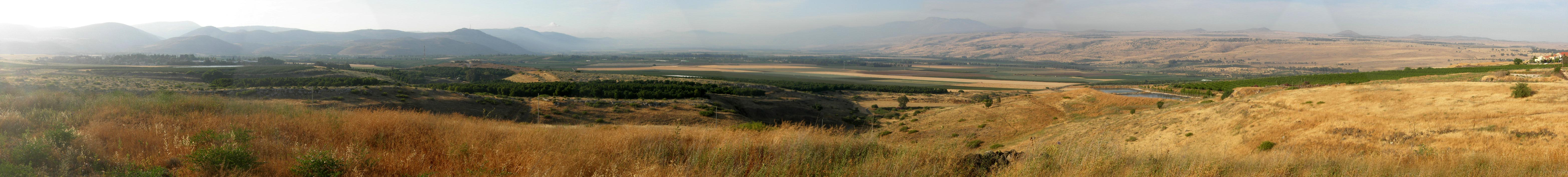

Other notable reserves in Israel include Hai Bar, the Carmelite and Yotvata Desert reserves. The Hai Bar organization was established in the 1960s by Avraham Yoffe, whose objective was to safeguard the remaining wildlife in Palestine and reintroduce extinct species. The Carmelite reserve has been highly effective in the conservation and reintroduction of the Persian brown deer into the wild. Additionally, efforts have been made to protect the Eurasian vultures and reintroduce the European roe deer and Anatolian aurochs to the country. The Yotvata Hai-Bar Nature Reserve is dedicated to the protection and propagation of animals believed to have inhabited Palestine in ancient times. Experts at the reserve have successfully reintroduced Asian wildebeest and Arabian oryx to the Negev Desert, and are also propagating other Levantine and African desert animals, such as Arabian tigers and Abu Harrab's oryx.

=== Palestine ===
The West Bank encompasses 48 nature reserves, some of which were designated during the British Mandate for Palestine and the remainder during the subsequent years of Israeli authority. The combined area of the reserves is 330,700 dunams (approximately 330 km^{2}), representing 5.6% of the West Bank. The majority of these reserves are situated in the eastern slopes and the Jordan Valley. The primary objective of these reserves was to facilitate the acquisition of land for new colonies. However, some of these protected areas have also served to protect plant life. The Shobash Reserve is the largest of the reserves, with an area of over 55 km^{2}. The most notable of these is the Wadi al-Badan Reserve, situated 5 kilometers northeast of Nablus. In collaboration with local and international organizations, the Palestinian Authority has implemented afforestation and forest protection programs. These endeavors have encompassed initiatives undertaken by numerous non-governmental organizations within and beyond Palestine. These include the replanting of trees uprooted from Palestinian soil, bulldozed by Israeli occupying forces in the occupied West Bank and Gaza Strip, for the construction or expansion of Israeli settlements and roads leading to them, as well as the construction of the West Bank barrier. Currently, hundreds of thousands of olive, fruit, and palm trees are being planted.

=== Syria ===
Since the early 1990s, the Syrian government has designated areas within the country as nature reserves, with the number of such reserves increasing as part of a broader program to protect the national and local environment and ecosystems, to conserve biodiversity, and to promote plant and animal biodiversity. Additionally, the reserves have been established for scientific research purposes. The first nature reserve in Syria, the Tallila Nature Reserve, was established by a decision of the Syrian Minister of Agriculture and Agrarian Reform on 22 July 1991. The reserve is situated in the Syrian Desert, to the east of Palmyra. It is of significant importance as it represents the last stronghold of the northern horned ibis in the Levant, and the second remaining stronghold in the entire Middle East. The sanctuary plays a pivotal role in the breeding of Arabian oryx and reindeer, which have been reintroduced from Jordan and Saudi Arabia since 1996. Saudi Arabia presented the fledgling sanctuary with 30 gazelles as a gift, and by 2009, the number of gazelles had been increased to nearly 600. A number of the animals were transferred to the newly established Al-Adhami Reserve in Aleppo Governorate. Additionally, the reserve received eight Arabian oryx as a gift from Jordan, which were subsequently raised to 125 in 2009. Another noteworthy reserve in Syria is the Shuh and Cedar Reserve, which represents the most significant Mediterranean reserve in the country. The reserve was established by a decision of the Minister of Agriculture and Agrarian Reform on 22 July 1996, and is situated in the Salanfa district of the Latakia Governorate. In addition to the Jabal al-Nabi Matta Reserve, which is situated on the western and eastern slopes of the summit of Jabal al-Nabi Matta in Dreikish, Tartus. In addition to the aforementioned reserves, the Syrian government has established 21 other reserves, each with a distinct ecosystem. These ecosystems include forests, wetlands, beaches, seas, and deserts. The establishment of these reserves was guided by the national standards and conditions for reserves, which were prepared by a national team based on international standards adopted by the IUCN. The aforementioned reserves encompass the following: the Al-Thawra Island Reserve in Lake Assad, the Umm al-Tayyur Reserve, and the Al-Lathab Reserve. The reserves that have been designated thus far represent approximately half of the strategic goal outlined in the National Biodiversity Strategy, which encompasses 49 sites proposed for designation.

=== Jordan ===
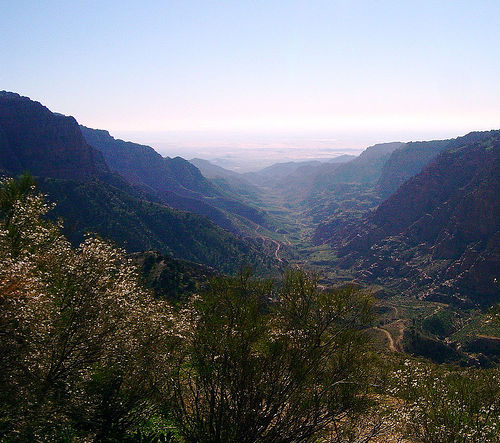
A narrow mountain pass in the Dana Biosphere Reserve

In Jordan, the Royal Society for the Protection of Nature (RSPN) was established in 1966 under the patronage of King Hussein bin Talal as a non-governmental organization dedicated to the protection of wildlife and their habitats. Subsequently, the Jordanian government granted the RSPN a mandate to establish and manage nature reserves. In 1974, a delegation from the IUCN and the International Wildlife Conservation Fund (IWCF) visited Jordan with the objective of providing support for the country's wildlife conservation efforts. During this visit, the Shumari Reserve, the first reserve in Jordan, was established with the aim of facilitating the reintroduction of the Arabian oryx to the region. In 1994, the Jordanian government ratified the Convention on Biological Diversity, which was adopted at the Earth Summit in Rio de Janeiro in 1992. This was evidenced by the establishment of the Dana Nature Reserve, which subsequently gained international recognition and was later declared the Dana Biosphere Reserve. In 1997, a study was conducted to review, evaluate, and update a proposed network of reserves. In 2005, a document was prepared for the Jordan Valley Integrated Ecosystem Management Project, which included the establishment of several new proposed reserves. The most prominent Jordanian reserves include, in addition to Dana, the Ajloun Forest Reserve, the Wadi Rum Reserve, and the Azraq Reserve.

There are eight wetlands in the Levant that are listed under the Ramsar Convention on Wetlands of International Importance. These areas are Sabkha al-Jaboul, Ain Afaq, Houla, Azraq, Palm Islands, Tyre Beach, Deir al-Nuriya, and Amik.

== See also ==
- Nature reserves in Jordan
