= Scrobipalpa traganella =

Scientific classification
- Domain: Eukaryota
- Kingdom: Animalia
- Phylum: Arthropoda
- Class: Insecta
- Order: Lepidoptera
- Family: Gelechiidae
- Genus: Scrobipalpa
- Species: S. traganella

Binomial name
- Scrobipalpa traganella (Chretien, 1915)

Synonyms
- Lita traganella Chretien, 1915; Euscrobipalpa traganella

Species of moth

Scrobipalpa traganella is a moth of the family Gelechiidae. It was described by Pierre Chrétien in 1915. It is found in France, Spain and Portugal, as well as on the Canary Islands and Malta. It was originally described from northern Africa, where it has been recorded from Algeria and Tunisia. It is also present in the Middle East and Pakistan.

Larva on Bassia muricatus, Caroxylon vermiculatum and Traganum species.
