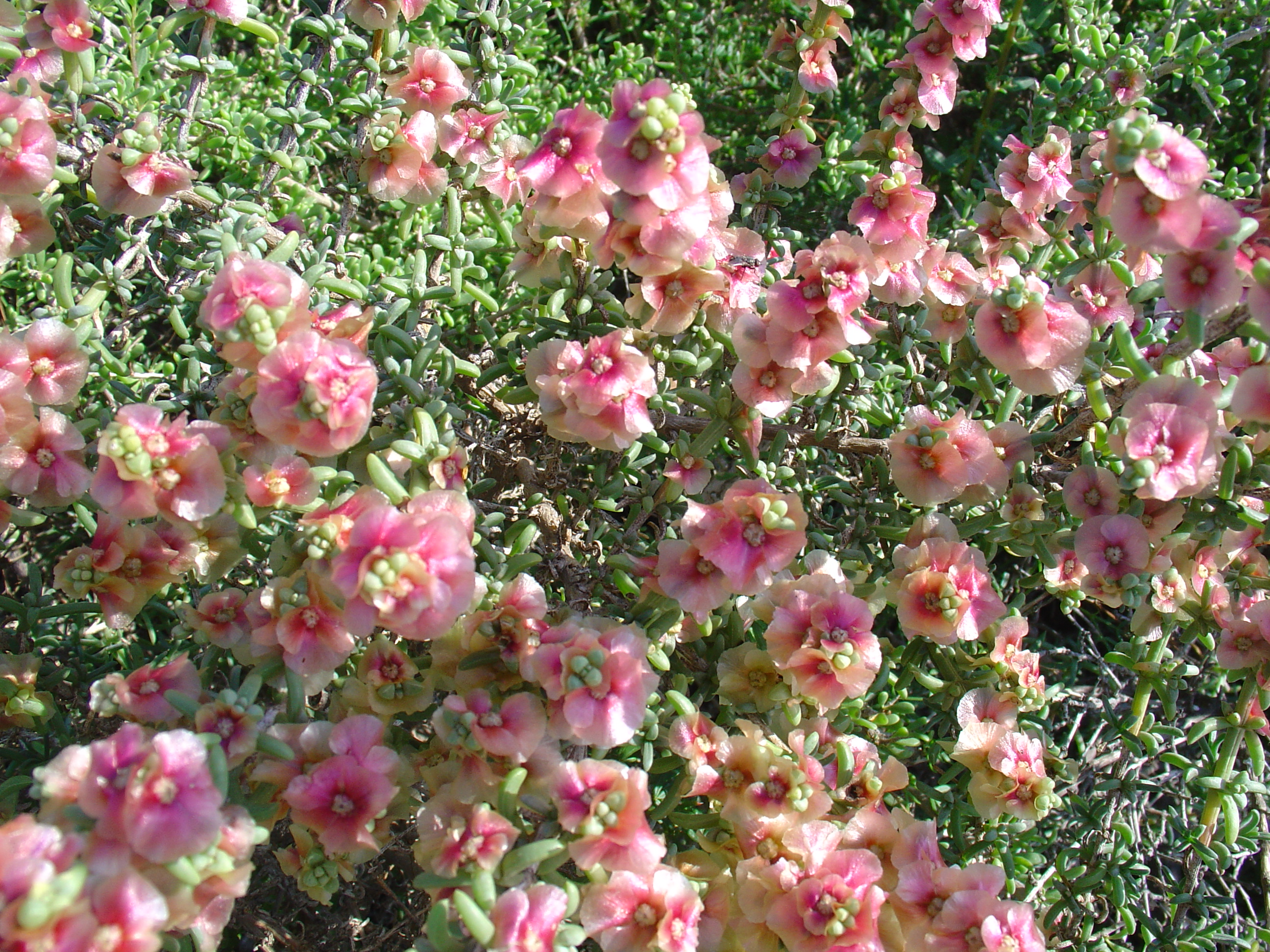
- Salsola oppositifolia, in fruit

Scientific classification
- Kingdom: Plantae
- Clade: Tracheophytes
- Clade: Angiosperms
- Clade: Eudicots
- Order: Caryophyllales
- Family: Amaranthaceae
- Subfamily: Salsoloideae; Raf.

Genera
- About 35 genera, see text

= Salsoloideae =

Subfamily of flowering plants

The Salsoloideae are a subfamily of the Amaranthaceae, formerly in family Chenopodiaceae.

== Description ==
These are herbs, subshrubs, shrubs and some trees. Stems and leaves are often succulent. The ovary contains a spiral embryo. In most genera, scarious wings develop at the outside of the fruiting perianth, allowing for dispersal by the wind (anemochory). In tribe Caroxyleae, the stamens have vesiculose anther appendages, discolor with anthers, that probably play a role for insect pollination. In tribe Salsoleae the anther appendages are absent or small and inconspicuous.

== Distribution ==
The area with most species (center of diversity) are the deserts and semideserts of Central-Asia and the Middle East. Distribution of the subfamily extends to the Mediterranean, to Middle-Europe, north and south Africa, and Australia, some species have also been introduced to America. Many species grow in dry habitats (xerophytes) or tolerate salty soils (halophytes), some are ruderals.

== Photosynthesis pathway ==
Salsoloideae are C_{4} plants (with a few exceptions in tribe Salsoleae). Tribe Caroxyleae is exclusively of the NAD-malic enzyme C_{4} subtype. Most Salsoleae also use the NADP-malic enzyme.

== Taxonomy ==
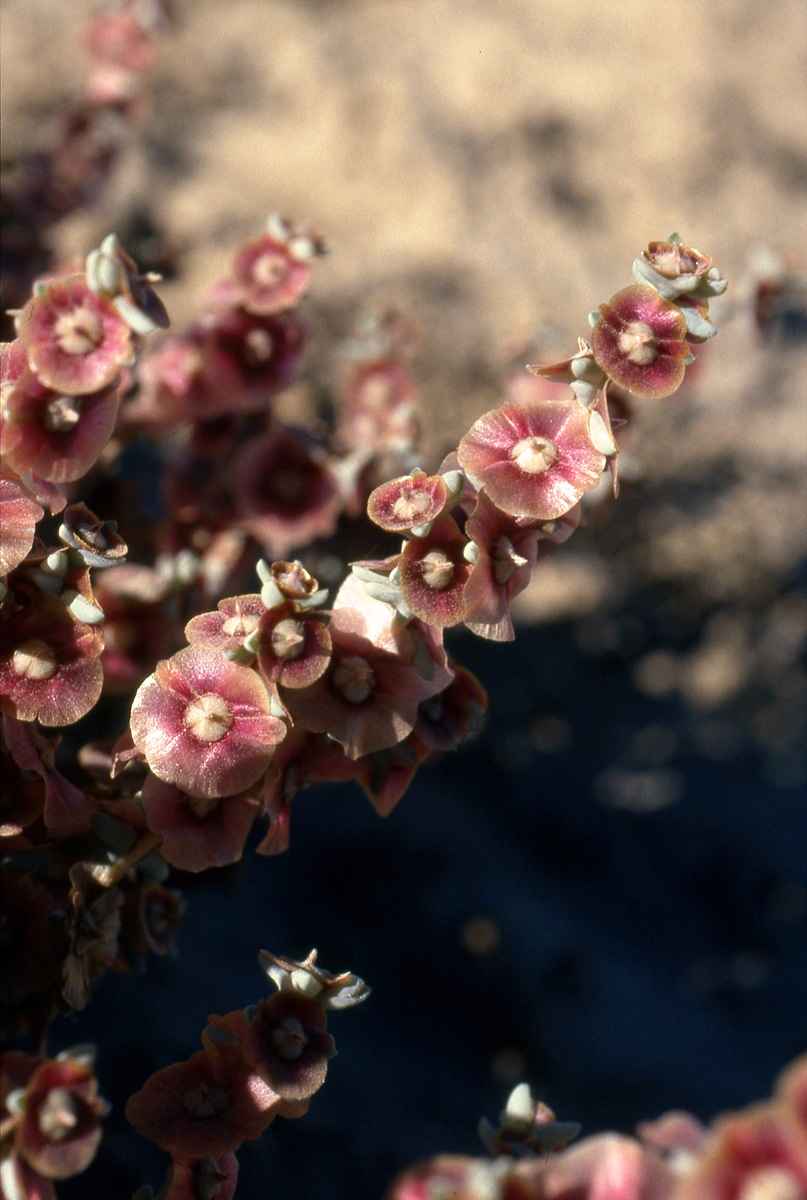
Climacoptera turcomanica, in fruit

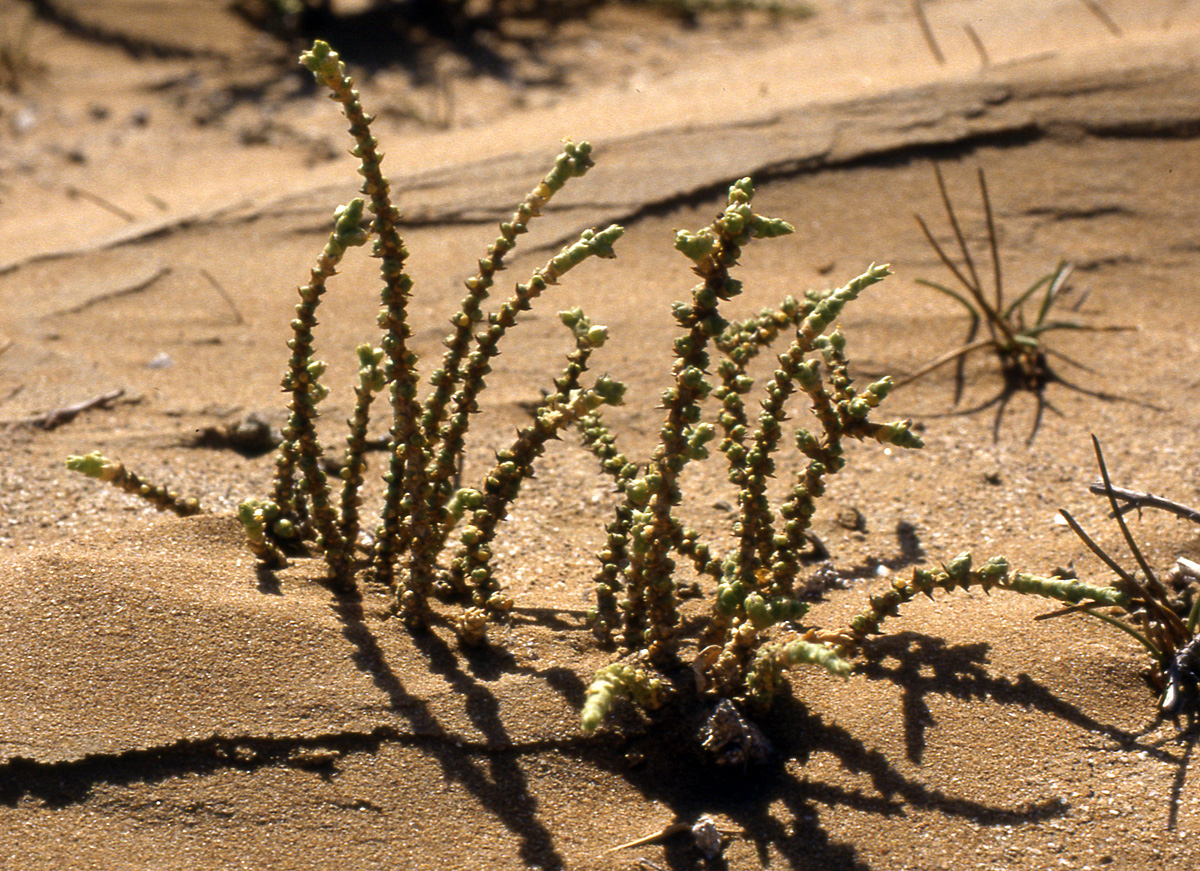
Cornulaca monacantha

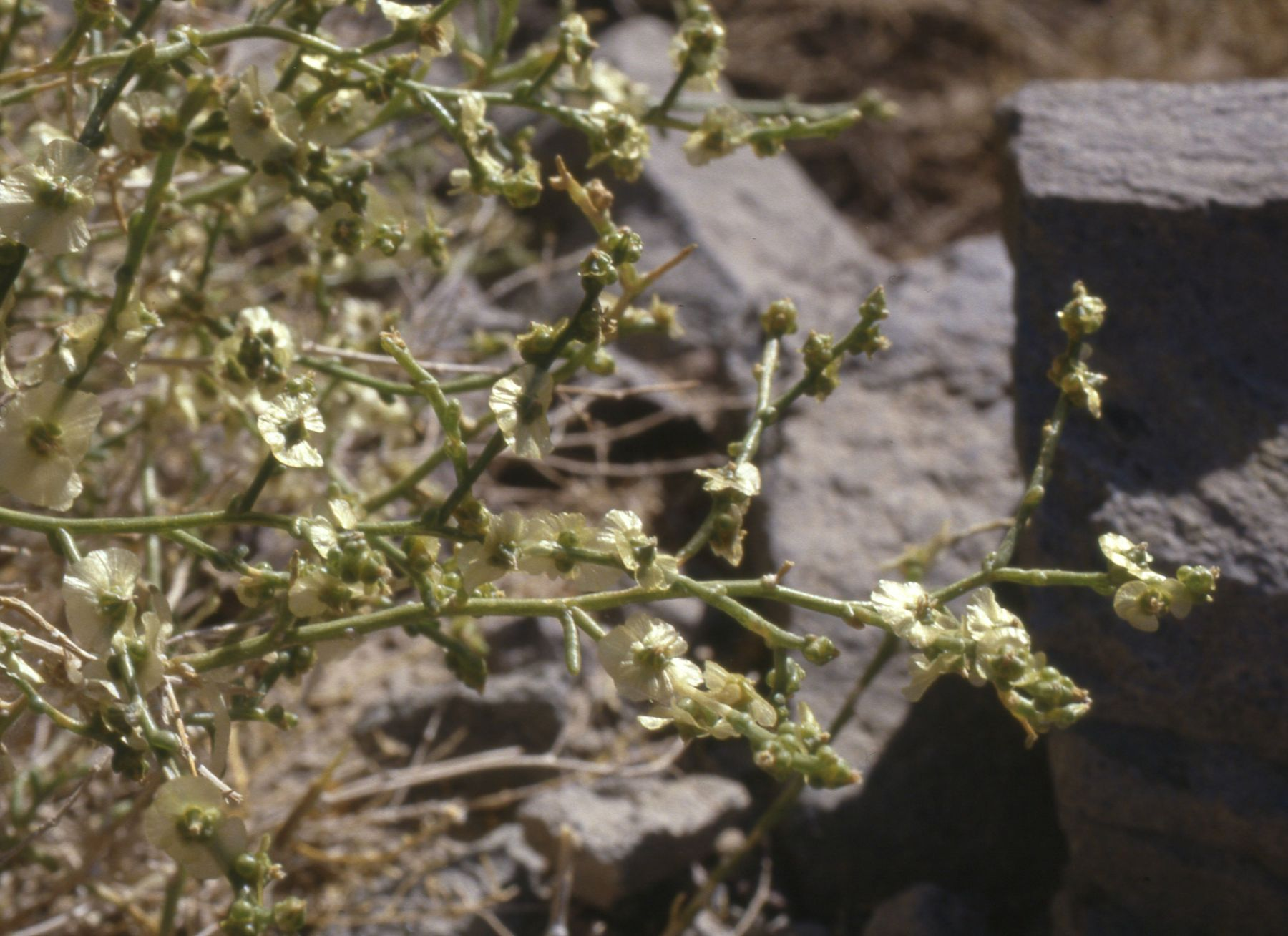
Halothamnus subaphyllus, in fruit

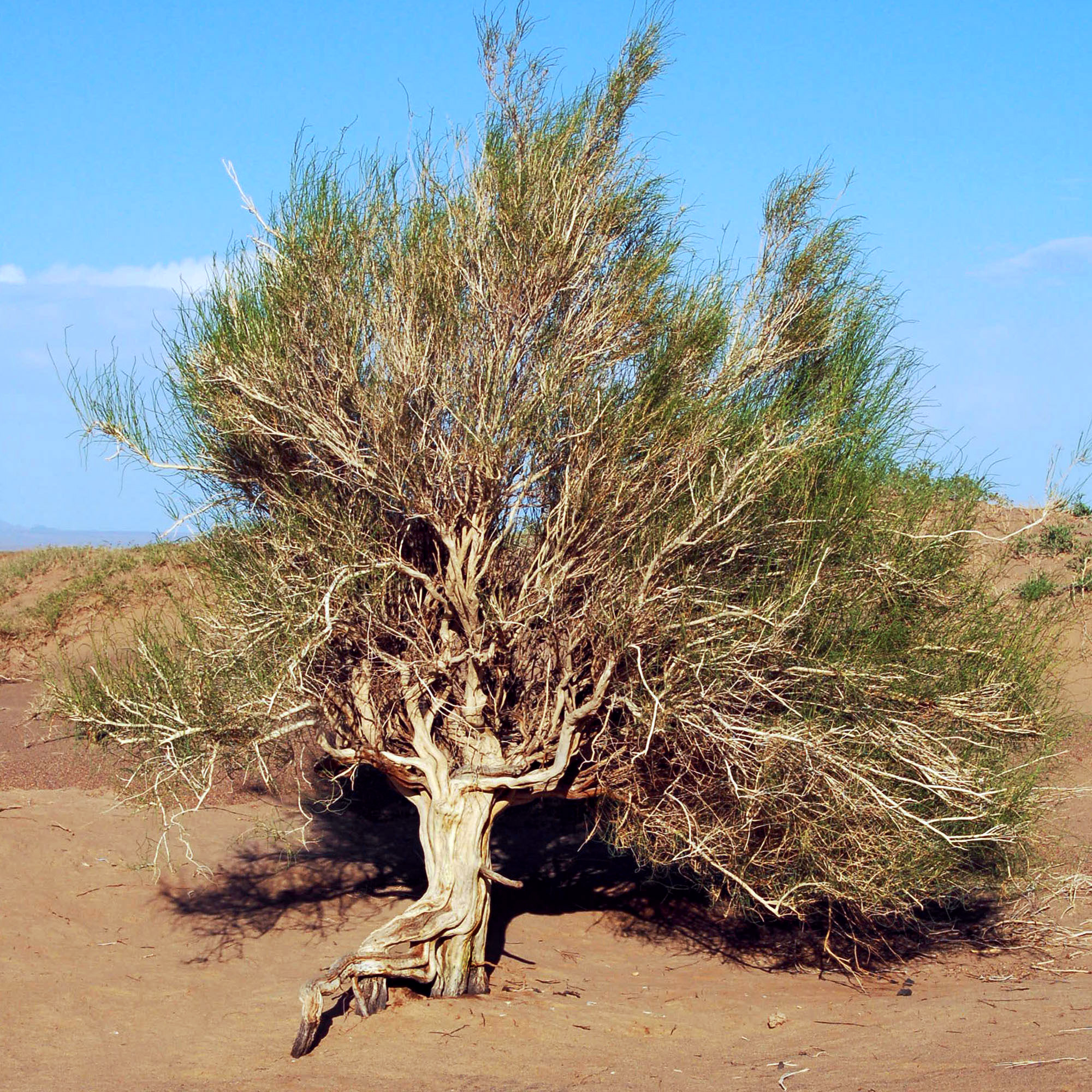
Saxaul, Haloxylon ammodendron

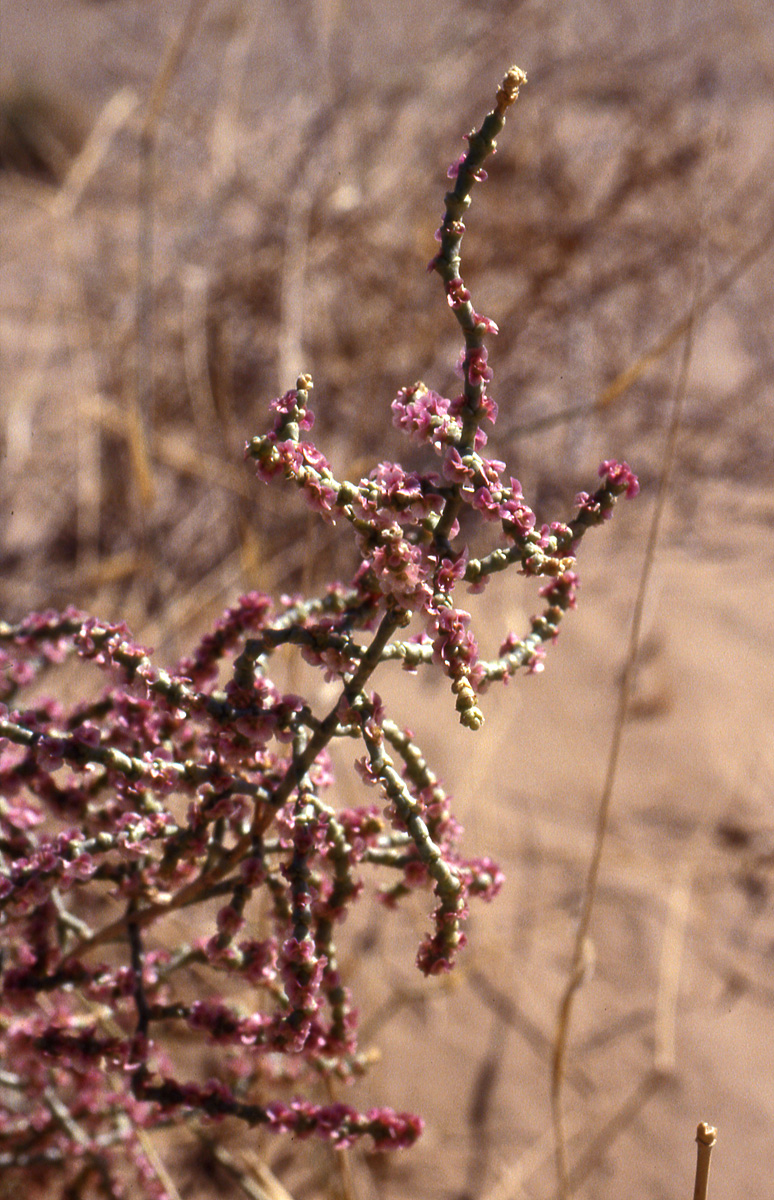
Hammada griffithii, in fruit

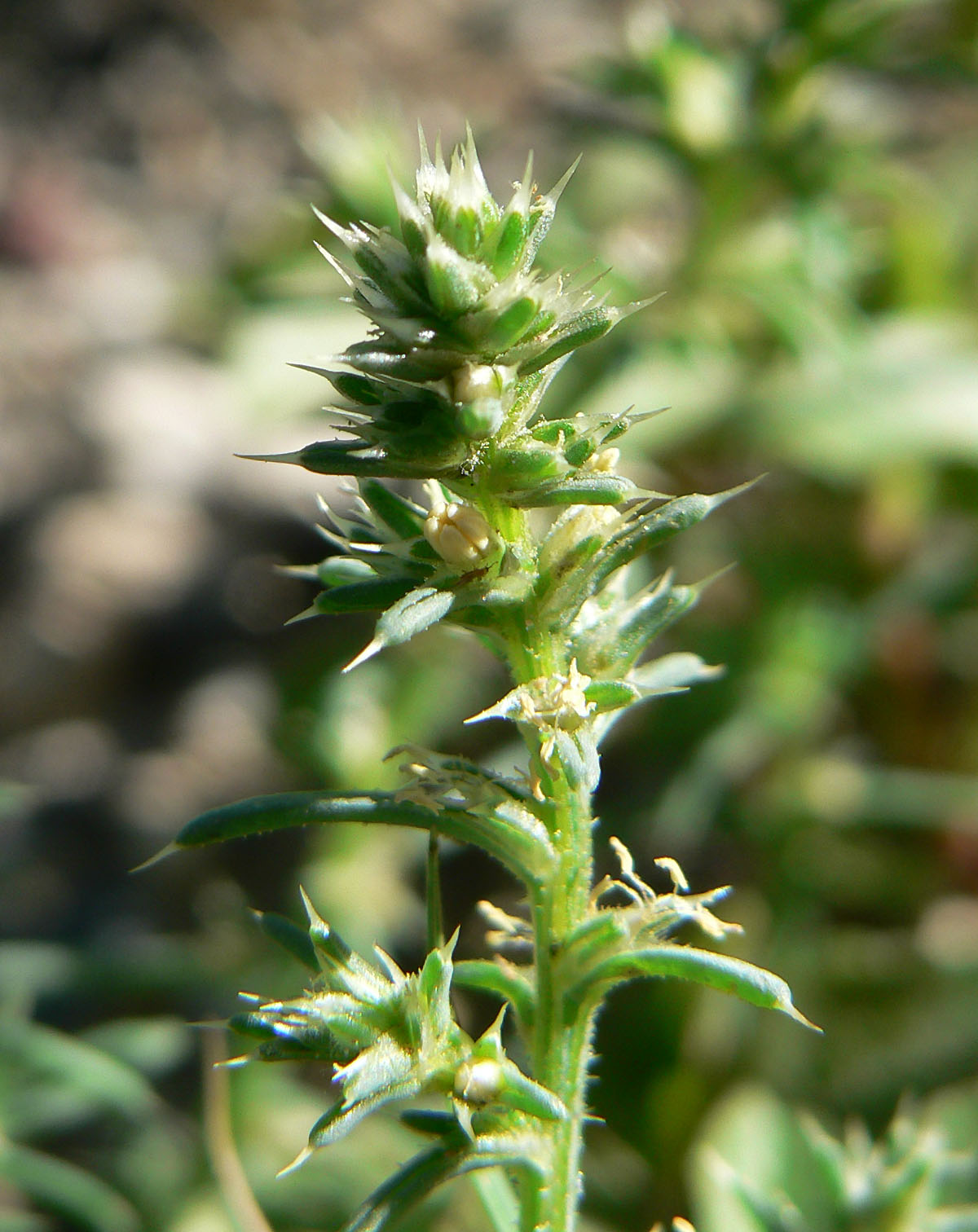
Salsola tragus

The type genus of subfamily Salsoloideae is Salsola L. According to recent research, the former classification did not reflect the phylogenetic relationship, so that the subfamily had to be reclassified; it is now split in two tribes, Caroxyleae and Salsoleae (in the strict sense). The tribe Camphorosmeae is now treated in its own subfamily, Camphorosmoideae.

=== Caroxyleae ===
Caroxyleae Akhani & E. H. Roalson (as "Caroxyloneae")

- Akhania Sukhor., with 5 species
- Caroxylon Thunb., with 128 species
- Climacoptera Botsch., with 41 species
- Halanthium K.Koch, with 5 species
- Halarchon Bunge, with one species
  - Halarchon vesiculosum (Moq.) Bunge
- Halimocnemis C. A. Mey., with 27 species (Syn. Gamanthus Bunge, Halotis Bunge)
- Halocharis Moq., with 7 species
- Kaviria Akhani & E. H. Roalson, with 10 species
- Nanophyton Less., with ca. 10 species
- Ofaiston Raf., with one species
  - Ofaiston monandrum (Pall.) Moq.
- Petrosimonia Bunge, with 12 species
- Piptoptera Bunge, with one species
  - Piptoptera turkestana Bunge
- Physandra Botsch., with one species
  - Physandra halimocnemis (Botsch.) Botsch.
- Pyankovia Akhani & E. H. Roalson, with one species
  - Pyankovia brachiata (Pall.) Akhani & E. H. Roalson

=== Salsoleae ===
- Anabasis L. ( incl. Fredolia (Coss. & Durieu ex Bunge) Ulbr.), with 29 species
- Arthrophytum Schrenk, with 9 species
- Cornulaca Delile, with 5 species
- Cyathobasis Aellen, with one species:
  - Cyathobasis fruticulosa (Bunge) Aellen
- Girgensohnia Bunge ex Fenzl, with 4 species
- Halogeton C. A. Mey, with 5 species. (Syn. Agathophora (Fenzl) Bunge, Micropeplis Bunge)
- Halothamnus Jaub. & Spach, with 21 species
- Haloxylon Bunge
- Hammada Iljin, with 12 species
- Horaninovia Fisch. & C. A. Mey, with 8 species
- Lagenantha Chiov. (Syn.: Gyroptera Botsch.) Classification not sure. With 1-3 species.
- Noaea Moq., with 3 species
- Nucularia Batt., Classification not sure. With one species:
  - Nucularia perrini Batt.
- Oreosalsola Akhani, 2016
- Rhaphidophyton Iljin, with one species
  - Rhaphidophyton regelii (Bunge) Iljin
- Salsola L., with 56 species. (Syns. Darneilla Maire & Weiller, Fadenia Aellen & Townsend, Neocaspia Tzvelev, Hypocylix Wol., Kali Mill.)
- Soda (Dumort.) Fourr. (synonym Seidlitzia Bunge ex Boiss.)
- Sympegma Bunge
- Traganum Del., with 2 species
- Traganopsis Maire et Wilczek, with one species
  - Traganopsis glomerata Maire & Wilczek
- Turania Akhani & E. H. Roalson, with 4 species
- Xylosalsola Tzvelev, with 4 species

=== Classification in subfamily not sure ===
- Iljinia Korovin, with one species:
  - Iljinia regelii (Bunge) Korovin
