= Coleophora salsolella =

Scientific classification
- Kingdom: Animalia
- Phylum: Arthropoda
- Class: Insecta
- Order: Lepidoptera
- Family: Coleophoridae
- Genus: Coleophora
- Species: C. salsolella

Binomial name
- Coleophora salsolella Chrétien, 1915

Synonyms
- Coleophora parajudaica Amsel, 1935

Species of moth

Coleophora salsolella is a moth of the family Coleophoridae. It is found in Algeria and the Palestinian Territories.

The larvae feed on Caroxylon vermiculatum var. microphyllum. They feed on the generative organs of their host plant.
