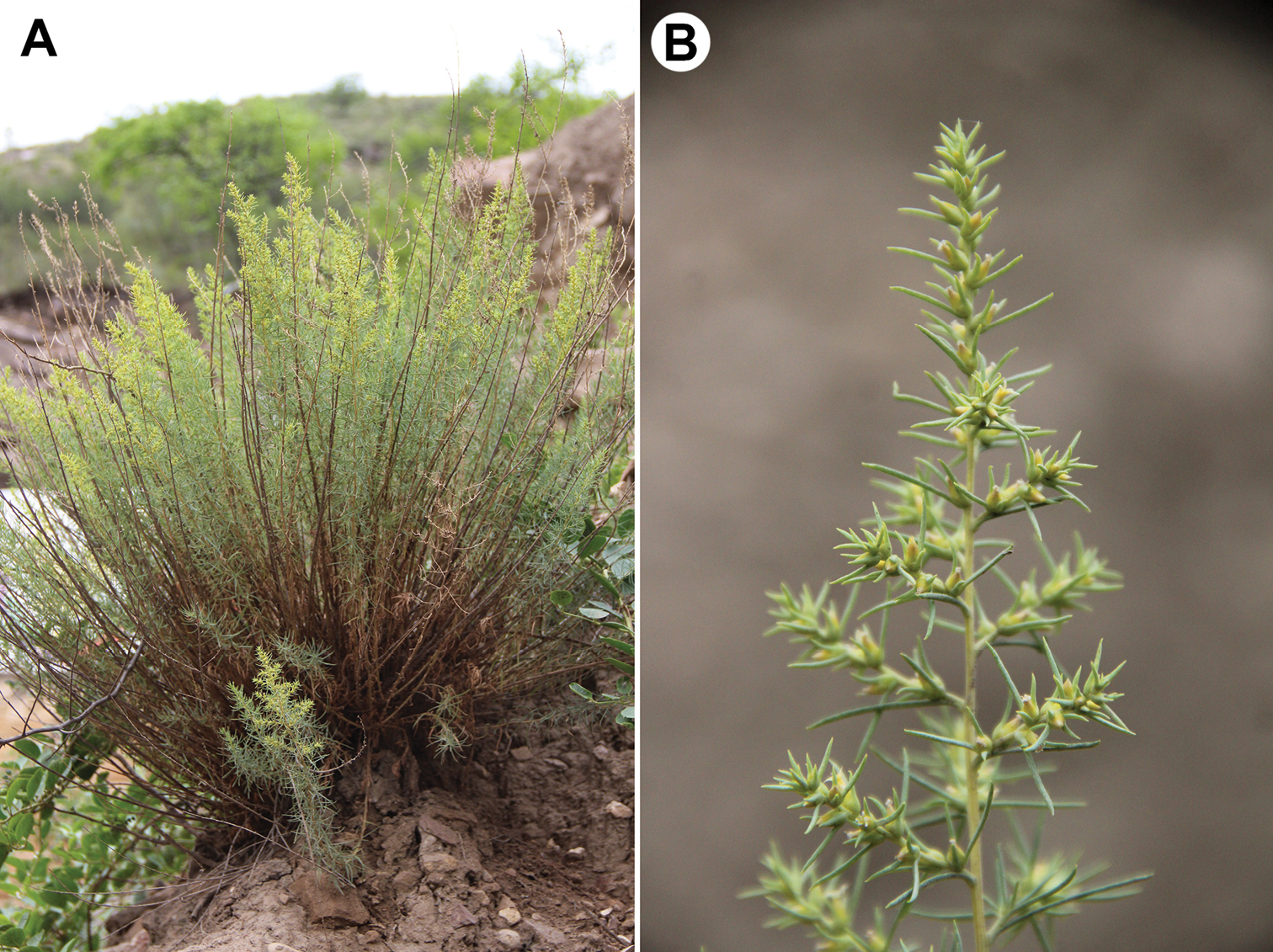
- Akhania daghestanica

Scientific classification
- Kingdom: Plantae
- Clade: Tracheophytes
- Clade: Angiosperms
- Clade: Eudicots
- Order: Caryophyllales
- Family: Amaranthaceae
- Subfamily: Salsoloideae
- Tribe: Caroxyleae
- Genus: Akhania; Sukhor. (2022)

Species
- Akhania canescens (Moq.) Sukhor.; Akhania carpatha (P.H.Davis) Sukhor.; Akhania daghestanica (Bunge) Sukhor.

= Akhania =

Genus of flowering plants

Akhania is a genus of flowering plants in the amaranth family, Amaranthaceae. It includes three species native to the eastern Mediterranean and western and central Asia, ranging from Greece through western Asia to the Caucasus, Kazakhstan, and Afghanistan.

Akhania includes small shrubs or subshrubs 20 to 100 cm tall. The plants have a bushy habit, with several or numerous stems, small linear or broadly lanceolate leaves which are bright green, glaucous, or grayish and 5–35 mm long by 1–3 mm wide.

The genus Akhania is named after the Iranian botanist Hossein Akhani. Its species were formerly placed in the genera Salsola or Caroxylon. A genetic and morphological analysis concluded that the three species formed a distinct clade which is sister to Caroxylon.

== Species ==
Three species are accepted:

- Akhania canescens (Moq.) Sukhor. – western and central Asia, from Turkey and Palestine to Afghanistan and Kazakhstan
- Akhania carpatha (P.H.Davis) Sukhor. – the Greek Islands of Crete, Karpathos, and the Cyclades
- Akhania daghestanica (Bunge) Sukhor. – endemic to Dagestan in the northeastern Caucasus.
