= Scrobipalpa hannemanni =

Scientific classification
- Kingdom: Animalia
- Phylum: Arthropoda
- Clade: Pancrustacea
- Class: Insecta
- Order: Lepidoptera
- Family: Gelechiidae
- Genus: Scrobipalpa
- Species: S. hannemanni

Binomial name
- Scrobipalpa hannemanni Povolný, 1966Povolný, 1966

Synonyms
- Euscrobipalpa hannemanni gamanthi Falkovitsh & Bidzilya, 2006

Species of moth

Scrobipalpa hannemanni is a moth of the family Gelechiidae. It is found in Croatia (Dalmatia), southern Russia, Central Asia, and Mongolia. It is named after Hans-Joachim Hannemann from the Natural History Museum, Berlin.

The length of the forewings is about 4.2 mm (0.17 in). The larvae feed on Gamanthus gamocarpus.

== Subspecies ==
There are three subspecies:

- Scrobipalpa hannemanni hannemanni Povolný, 1966
- Scrobipalpa hannemanni furva Povolný, 1969 (Mongolia)
- Scrobipalpa hannemanni gamanthi (Falkovitsh & Bidzilya, 2006) (Uzbekistan)
