= Barilla =

Several species of salt-tolerant plants

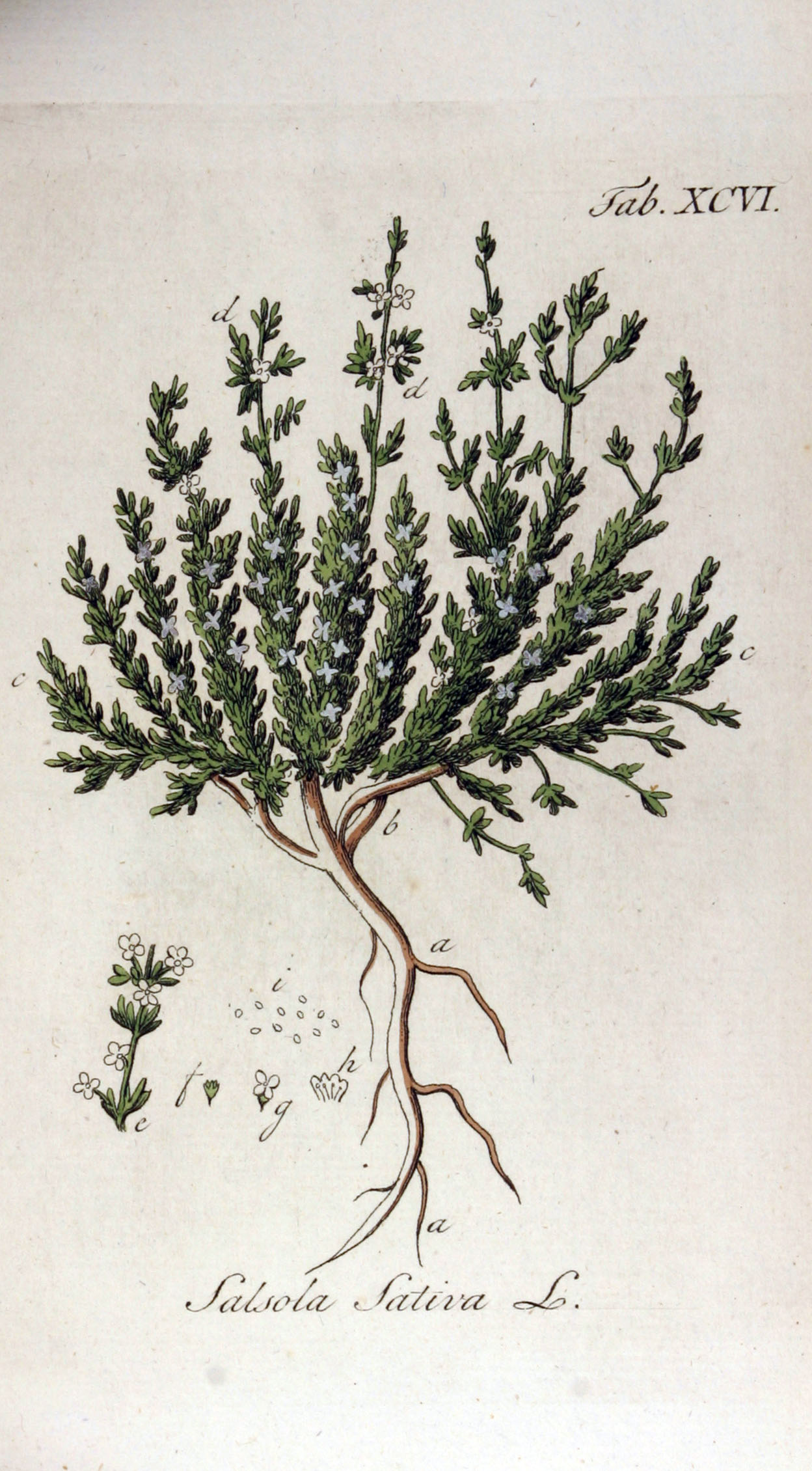
Halogeton sativus is one of the plants from which barilla was made. The species was formerly classified as Salsola sativa. Engraving published 1813 (Adolphus Ypey).

Barilla refers to several species of salt-tolerant (halophyte) plants that, until the 19th century, were the primary source of soda ash and hence of sodium carbonate. The word "barilla" was also used directly to refer to the soda ash obtained from plant sources. The word is an anglicization of the Spanish word barrilla for saltwort plants (a particular category of halophytes).

A very early reference indicating the value placed upon soda ash in Catalonia has been given by Glick, who notes that "In 1189 the monastery of Poblet granted to the glassblower Guillem the right to gather glasswort in return for tithe and two hundred pounds of sheet glass paid annually (The site of these glassworks, at Narola, was excavated in 1935.)." By the 18th century, Spain's barilla industry was exporting large quantities of soda ash of exceptional purity; the product was refined from the ashes of barilla plants that were specifically cultivated for this purpose. Presumably the word "barilla" entered English and other languages as a consequence of this export trade. The main Spanish barilla species included (i) Salsola soda (the common English term barilla plant for Salsola soda reflects this usage), (ii) Salsola kali, and (iii) Halogeton sativus (formerly Salsola sativa). Fairly recently, Pérez has concluded that the most prominent species was likely Halogeton sativus; earlier authors have tended to favor Salsola soda.

The word "barilla" was also used directly to refer to soda ash from any plant source, including not only the saltworts grown in Spain, but also glassworts, mangroves, and seaweed. These types of plant-derived soda ash are impure alkali substances that contain widely varying amounts of sodium carbonate (Na_{2}CO_{3}), some additional potassium carbonate (also an alkali), and a predominance of non-alkali impurities. The sodium carbonate, which is water-soluble, is "lixiviated" (extracted with water) from the ashes of the burned, dried plants. The resulting solution is boiled dry to obtain the finished barilla. A very similar process is used to obtain potash (mainly potassium carbonate) from the ashes of hardwood trees. The best Spanish barilla—prepared by master barrilleros—contained about 30% Na_{2}CO_{3}. In 1877 Kingzett described the importance of the barilla trade to Spain as follows: "So highly was the product valued, and the importance of the trade regarded, that by the laws of Spain the exportation of the seed was an offence punishable by death."

Some authors indicate that "barilla" was a specific plant used for soda ash production; this usage is erroneous, but presumably corresponds to the common usage of "barilla plant" exclusively for Salsola soda. Perhaps this common usage itself reflects an old error in assuming that a single plant species was used by the Spaniards for their industry. In still earlier times, the sources of soda ash and the methods of processing it were secrets that were zealously guarded.

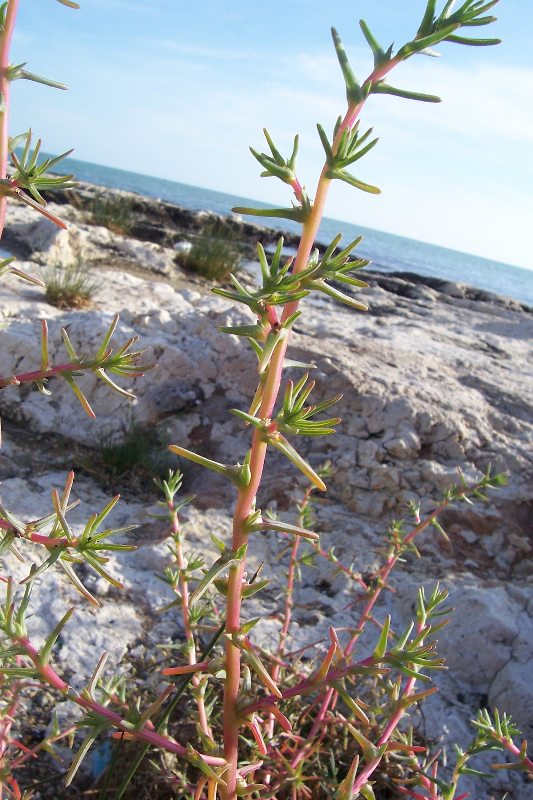
Salsola soda is a plant from which barilla was made.

== See also ==
- Salsola soda
- Salsola kali
- Halogeton sativus
- Glasswort
- Soda ash
- Seidlitzia rosmarinus
