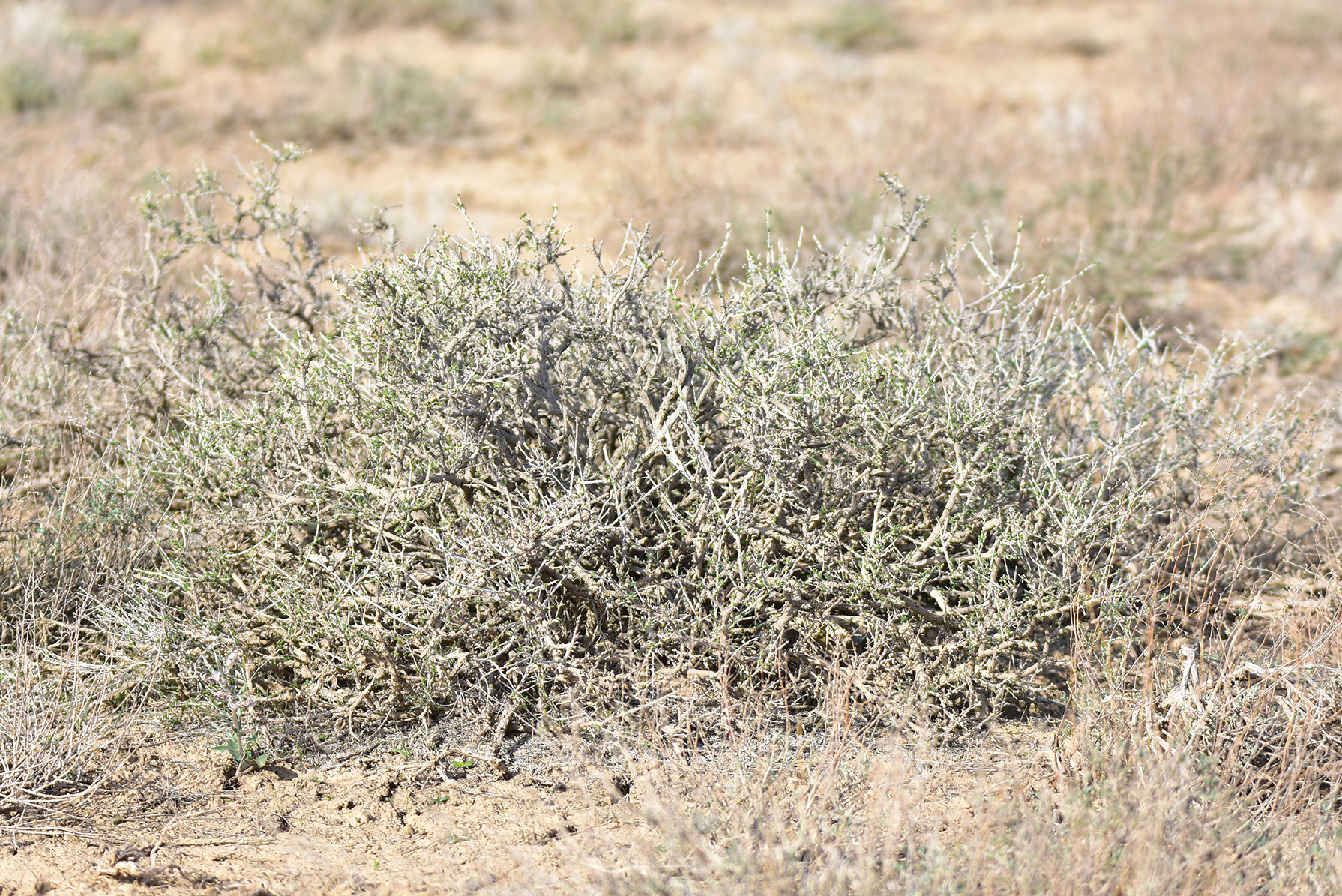
- Xylosalsola arbuscula

Scientific classification
- Kingdom: Plantae
- Clade: Tracheophytes
- Clade: Angiosperms
- Clade: Eudicots
- Order: Caryophyllales
- Family: Amaranthaceae
- Subfamily: Salsoloideae
- Genus: Xylosalsola; Tzvelev

= Xylosalsola =

Genus of flowering plants

Xylosalsola is a genus of flowering plants belonging to the family Amaranthaceae. Its native range is Southern European Russia to Mongolia and Pakistan. Its species include:

- Xylosalsola arbuscula (Pall.) Tzvelev
- Xylosalsola chiwensis (Popov) Akhani & Roalson
- Xylosalsola paletzkiana (Litv.) Akhani & Roalson
- Xylosalsola richteri (Moq.) Akhani & Roalson
