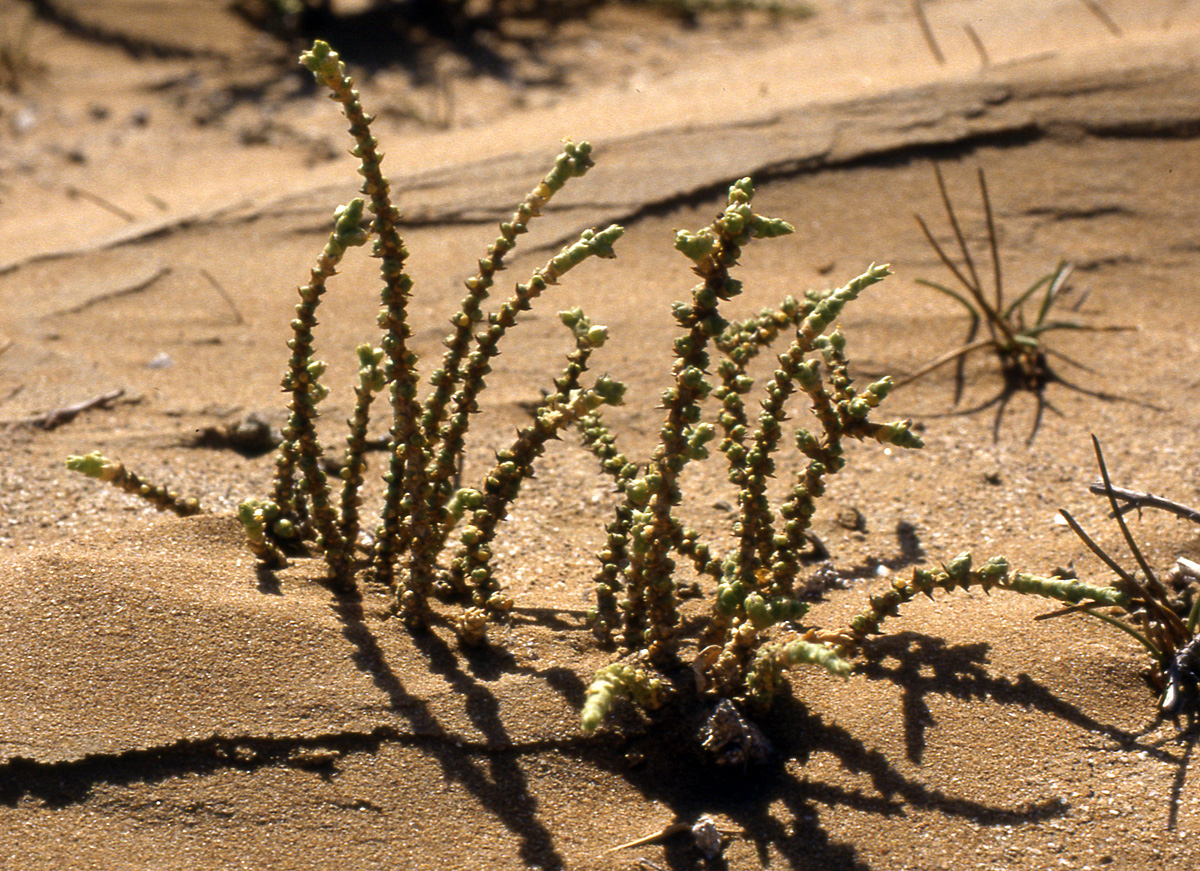

Scientific classification
- Kingdom: Plantae
- Clade: Tracheophytes
- Clade: Angiosperms
- Clade: Eudicots
- Order: Caryophyllales
- Family: Amaranthaceae
- Subfamily: Salsoloideae
- Tribe: Salsoleae
- Genus: Cornulaca; Delile

= Cornulaca =

Genus of flowering plants

Cornulaca is a genus of flowering plants belonging to the family Amaranthaceae.

Its native range is Western Tropical Africa to China.

Species:

- Cornulaca alaschanica C.P.Tsien & G.L.Chu
- Cornulaca aucheri Moq.
- Cornulaca ehrenbergii Asch.
- Cornulaca korshinskyi Litv.
- Cornulaca monacantha Delile
- Cornulaca setifera (DC.) Moq.
