= Modest Ilyin =

Modest Mikhailovich Ilyin or Iljin (Модест Михайлович Ильин; 17 October 1889, Góra Kalwaria - 9 May 1967, Leningrad) was a Russian botanist. He was the keeper of the Herbarium of the Leningrad State University (now the Herbarium of the Komarov Botanical Institute) for many decades.

Ilyin was raised in Krasnoyarsk. Influenced by Arkady Tugarinov (the director of the Krasnoyarsk Museum), he developed an interest in natural sciences, particularly botany. In 1909, he enrolled in the Faculty of Medicine at Tomsk University. There, he attended botanical lectures by Vasily Sapozhnikov (the university's dean).

In 1912, Ilyin moved to Saint Petersburg, deciding to continue his studies at Saint Petersburg University. He also worked as an assistant to Boris Fedtchenko and Vladimir L. Komarov at the university herbarium. In 1916, he graduated from Saint Petersburg University and became a curator at the herbarium.

Ilyin taught botany at Leningrad University for decades and described a large number of new species from a wide variety of plant families, especially from Central Asia. In 1935, Ilyin was awarded the degree of Doctor of Biological Sciences without defending a dissertation. He was named an Honored Scientist of the RSFSR in 1960. He was buried at the Northern Cemetery in Saint Petersburg.

The genus Iljinia and many species of plants were named after him.
