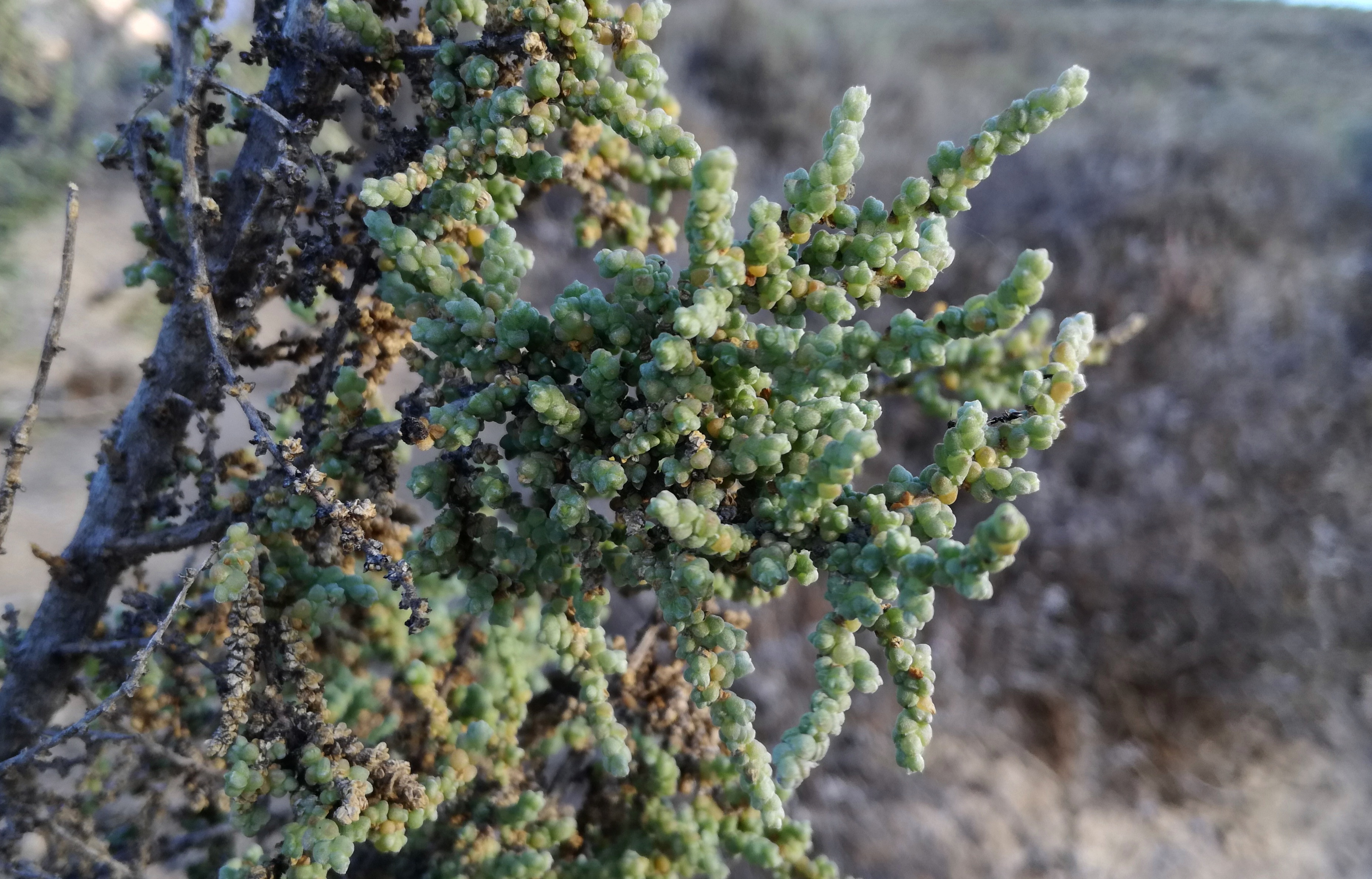
- Detail of ganna bush foliage

Scientific classification
- Kingdom: Plantae
- Clade: Tracheophytes
- Clade: Angiosperms
- Clade: Eudicots
- Order: Caryophyllales
- Family: Amaranthaceae
- Genus: Caroxylon
- Species: C. aphyllum

Binomial name
- Caroxylon aphyllum (L.f.) Tzvelev

= Caroxylon aphyllum =

Species of flowering plant

Caroxylon aphyllum (commonly known as the ganna or kanna bush) is a small species of shrub in the family Amaranthaceae.

It grows in the arid Karoo region of southern Africa. It typically grows in deep, dusty, saline soils, in valley bottoms and dried river plains. The shrub is so common that its name has become a designation of a certain type of Karoo ecosystem - "gannaveld" (sometimes called "vlakteveld") - and even of a local government - Kannaland Local Municipality.

This species has previously been classified as Salsola aphylla.
