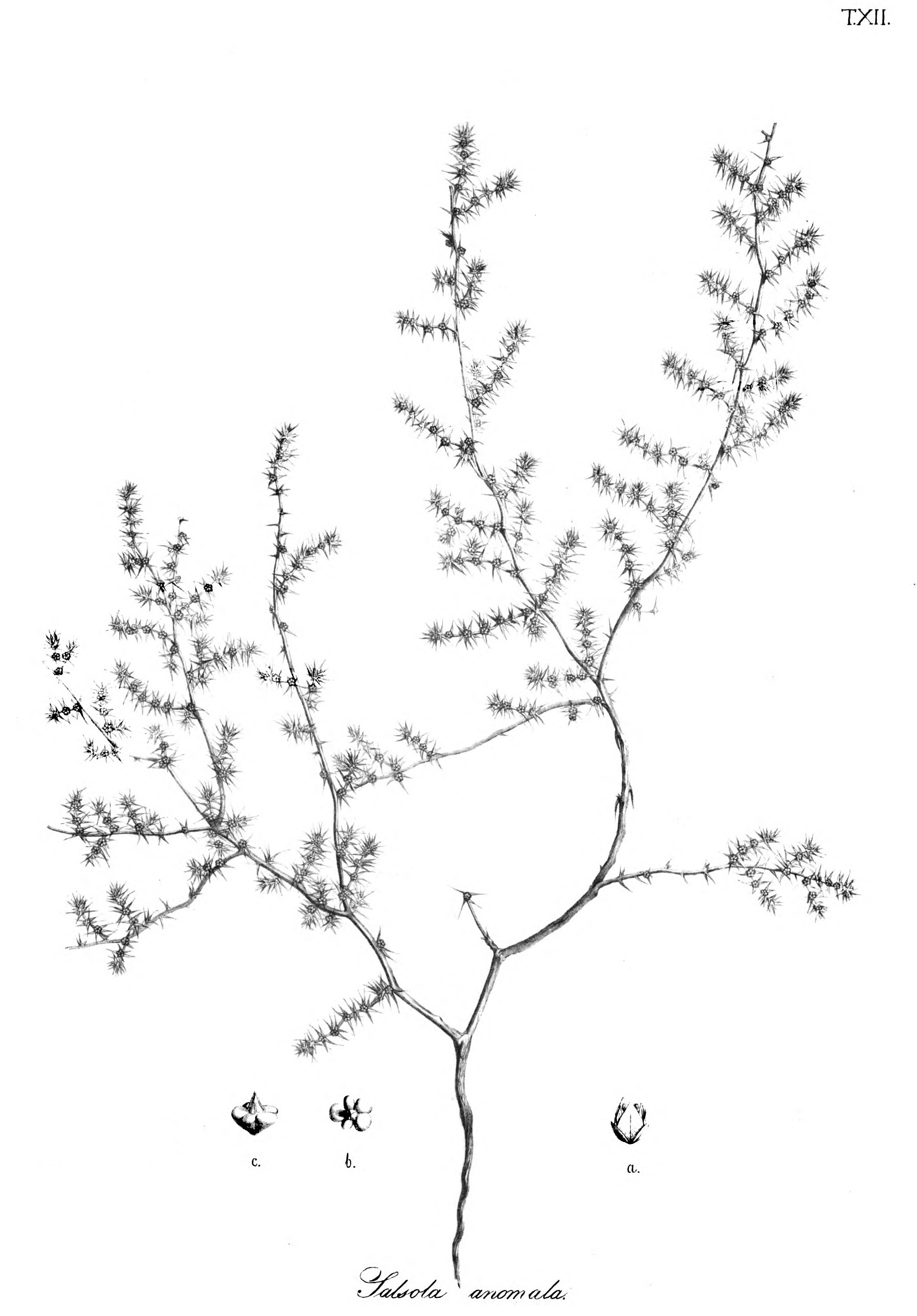
- Horaninovia anomala named as Salsola anomala in Eichwald

Scientific classification
- Kingdom: Plantae
- Clade: Tracheophytes
- Clade: Angiosperms
- Clade: Eudicots
- Order: Caryophyllales
- Family: Amaranthaceae
- Genus: Horaninovia; Fisch. & C.A.Mey.

= Horaninovia =

Genus of flowering plants

Horaninovia is a genus of flowering plants belonging to the family Amaranthaceae. It also belongs to the tribe Salsoleae as well as in the subfamily Salsoloideae.

They are herbaceous annuals, with dichotomous (forked into two equal branches) or opposite arranged branches. They have opposite or alternate spaced leaves which are acicular (slender or needle-shaped) or terete (circular in cross-section) and have a widened base. It has either solitary flowers or they are clustered in glomerules (groups) at the leaf axils (joints). The flowers have a 4 or parted perianth, with the segments being broadly ovate or oblong shaped. They are membranous or leathery in form. It has a cupular disk (of petals), with semi-orbicular lobes. In-between the lobes of the disk are stamens (5 in total). The anthers are cylindrical to broadly elliptic in shape, with or without an awn-like appendage. It has a very short style and the stigma is capitulate and 2- or 3-lobed. It has depressed globose shaped seed.

Its native range is from Iran to Xinjiang (in China). It is found in Afghanistan, Iran, Kazakhstan, Tajikistan, Turkmenistan, Uzbekistan and Xinjiang.

The genus name of Horaninovia is in honour of Pavel Gorianinov (1796–1866), a Russian botanist with an interest on fungus and ferns and was a professor at the medical academy in Saint Petersburg, and it was first described and published in Enum. Pl. Nov. Vol.1 on page 10 in 1841.

Known species:

- Horaninovia anomala (C.A.Mey.) Moq.
- Horaninovia capitata Sukhor.
- Horaninovia excellens (Iljin) Iljin
- Horaninovia minor Schrenk
- Horaninovia platyptera Charif & Aellen
- Horaninovia pungens (Gilli) Botsch.
- Horaninovia ulicina Fisch. & C.A.Mey

Horaninovia ulicina is the type species, it is found on sand dunes in Afghanistan, Iran, Kazakhstan and Turkmenistan.
