= Caroxylon imbricatum =

Scientific classification
- Kingdom: Plantae
- Clade: Embryophytes
- Clade: Tracheophytes
- Clade: Spermatophytes
- Clade: Angiosperms
- Clade: Eudicots
- Order: Caryophyllales
- Family: Amaranthaceae
- Genus: Caroxylon
- Species: C. imbricatum

Binomial name
- Caroxylon imbricatum (Forssk.) Moq.

Synonyms
- Salsola imbricata Forssk.; Salsola baryosma (Schult.) Dandy.

Species of plant

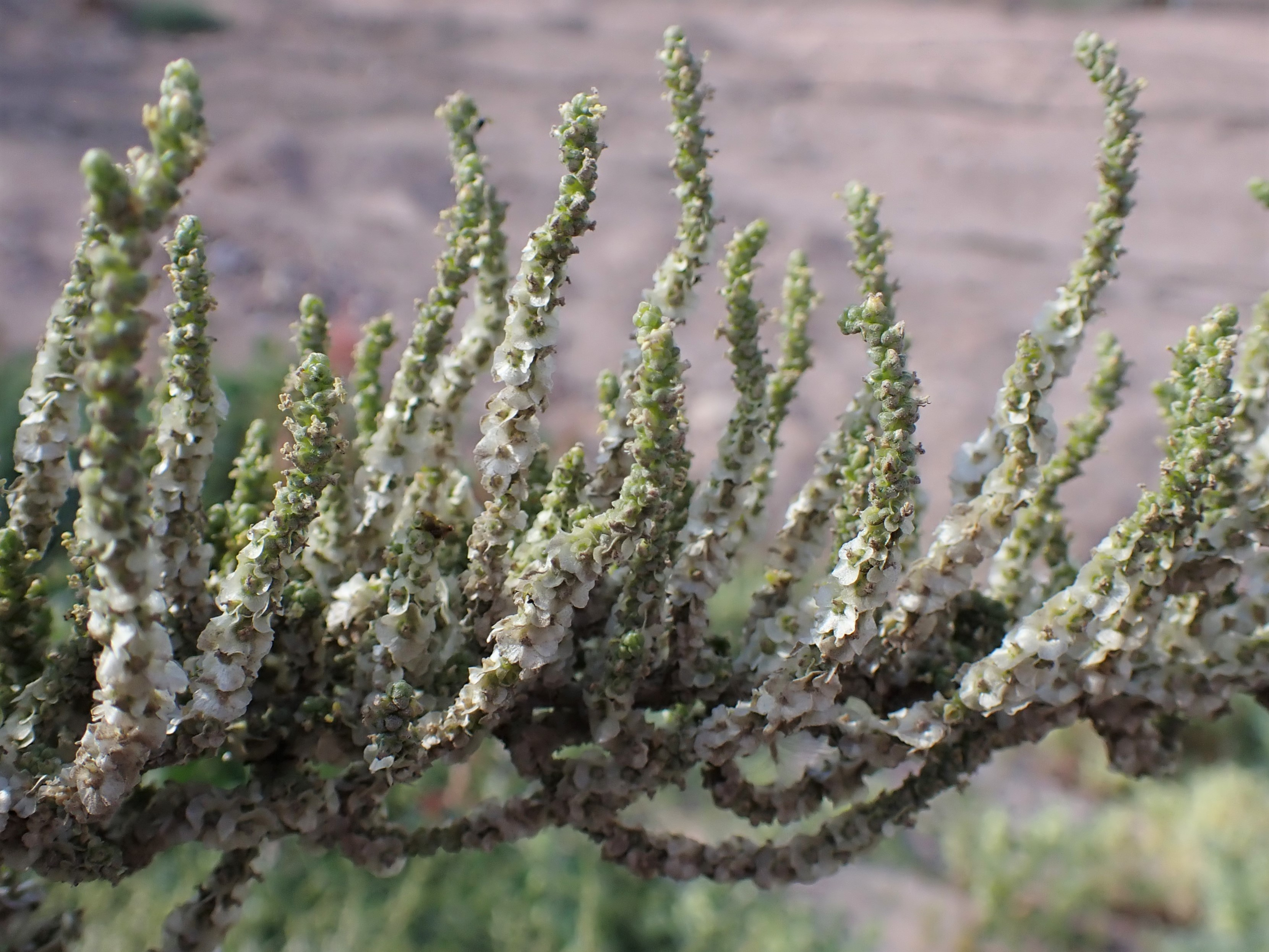
Salsola imbricata in Eilat, Israel

Caroxylon imbricatum, synonym Salsola imbricata, is a small species of shrub in the family Amaranthaceae. It grows in deserts and arid regions of north Africa, the Arabian Peninsula and southwestern Asia.

== Description ==
Caroxylon imbricatum is a small, spreading shrub or sub-shrub growing up to 1.2 m (4 ft) tall. The grey or reddish stems are up to 2 cm (0.8 in) thick and these and the lower leaves are densely hairy. In the upper parts of the plant the stems are creamy or pale grey and branch frequently, some branches growing vertically while others spread horizontally. Regularly-arranged, catkin-like branchlets project from the branches. The leaves are tiny, succulent and linear or narrowly triangular. The inflorescence is spike-like with bracts similar to the leaves, small flowers with five petals, five stamens and two styles. The fruiting perianth has silky wings.

== Taxonomy ==
The species was first described in 1775 as Salsola imbricata by the Swedish naturalist Peter Forsskål. In 1849, Alfred Moquin-Tandon transferred it to the genus Caroxylon, making it Caroxylon imbricatum (Forssk.) Moq., but later it was mostly accepted in genus Salsola. Following a phylogenetic analysis of Salsoloideae in 2007 by Akhani, H., et al., it has been proposed to place Salsola imbricata back into Caroxylon imbricatum. This placement is accepted by GBIF and Plants of the World Online.

== Distribution and habitat ==
This plant has a widespread distribution across the desert belt of Saharan Africa, the Arabian Peninsula, southern Iran, Pakistan, Afghanistan and northwestern India. It typically grows in disturbed areas such as runnels, washes, dry wadis, eroded slopes and coastal cliffs. It grows on various soil types and is a ruderal species, colonising fallow land and over-grazed pastures.

== Ecology ==
Caroxylon imbricatum is a halophytic plant; under conditions of salt stress, the plant increases its water content (becomes more succulent) and decreases the surface area of its leaves. Tests on the germination rates of seeds show that Caroxylon imbricatum sprouts more quickly and consistently at 20 °C than at higher temperatures, and shows higher germination rates at lower salinity levels than high ones. However, seeds treated at high salinity levels recovered their germination potential after immersion in unsalted water.

The species has traditionally been used as a vermifuge and for treating certain skin disorders. Five triterpene glycosides have been isolated from the roots of Caroxylon imbricatum, two of them being new glycoside derivatives not previously known.
