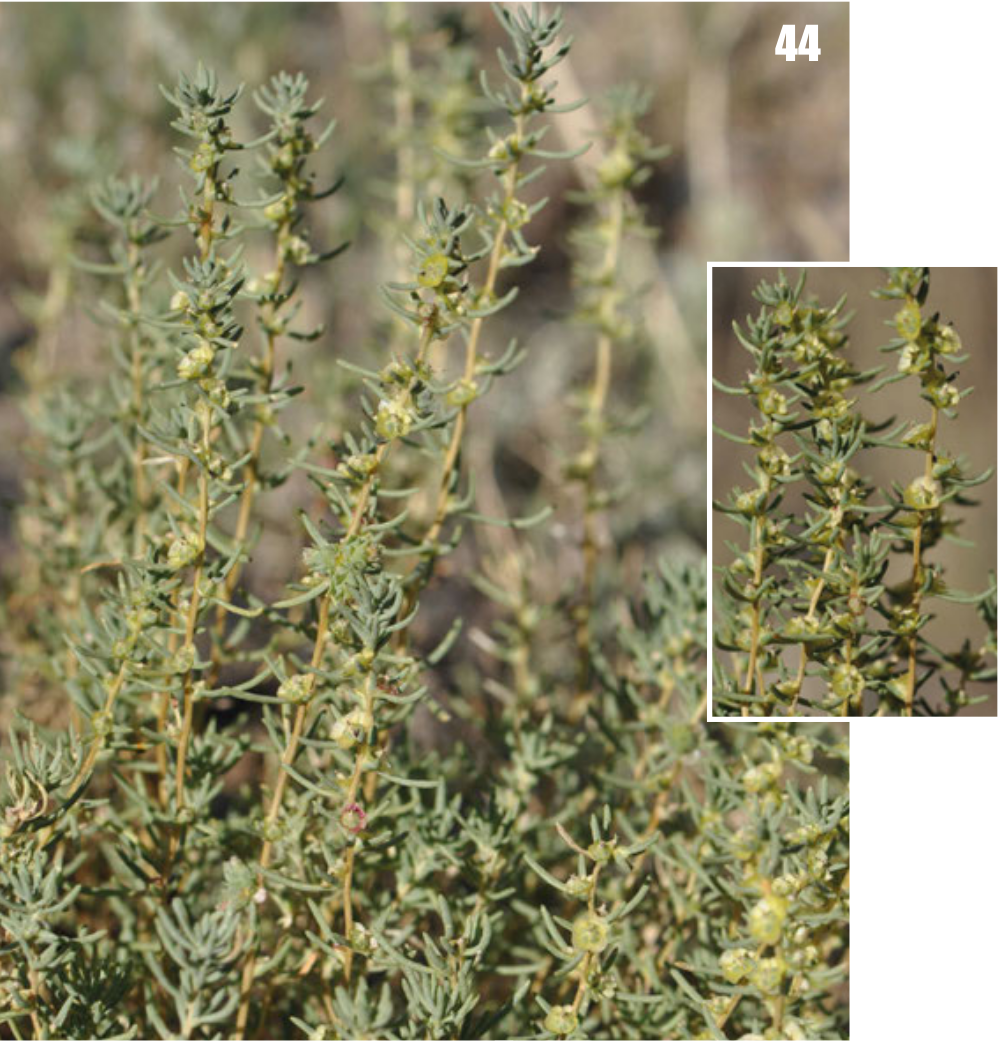
- Salsola drobovii (now Oreosalsola drobovii) in Tajikistan

Scientific classification
- Kingdom: Plantae
- Clade: Embryophytes
- Clade: Tracheophytes
- Clade: Spermatophytes
- Clade: Angiosperms
- Clade: Eudicots
- Order: Caryophyllales
- Family: Amaranthaceae
- Subfamily: Salsoloideae
- Tribe: Salsoleae
- Genus: Oreosalsola; Akhani

= Oreosalsola =

Genus of plants

Oreosalsola is a genus of plants in the family Amaranthaceae, erected by Akhani in 2016. Species were often previously placed in the genus Salsola; they have been recorded from temperate and sub-tropical central Asia.

== Species ==
Plants of the World Online includes:

1. Oreosalsola abrotanoides (Bunge) Akhani
2. Oreosalsola botschantzevii (Kurbanov) Akhani
3. Oreosalsola drobovii (Botsch.) Akhani
4. Oreosalsola flexuosa (Botsch.) Akhani
5. Oreosalsola lipschitzii (Botsch.) Akhani
6. Oreosalsola masenderanica (Botsch.) Akhani
7. Oreosalsola montana (Litv.) Akhani - type species
8. Oreosalsola oreophila (Botsch.) Akhani
9. Oreosalsola tianschanica (Botsch.) Akhani
