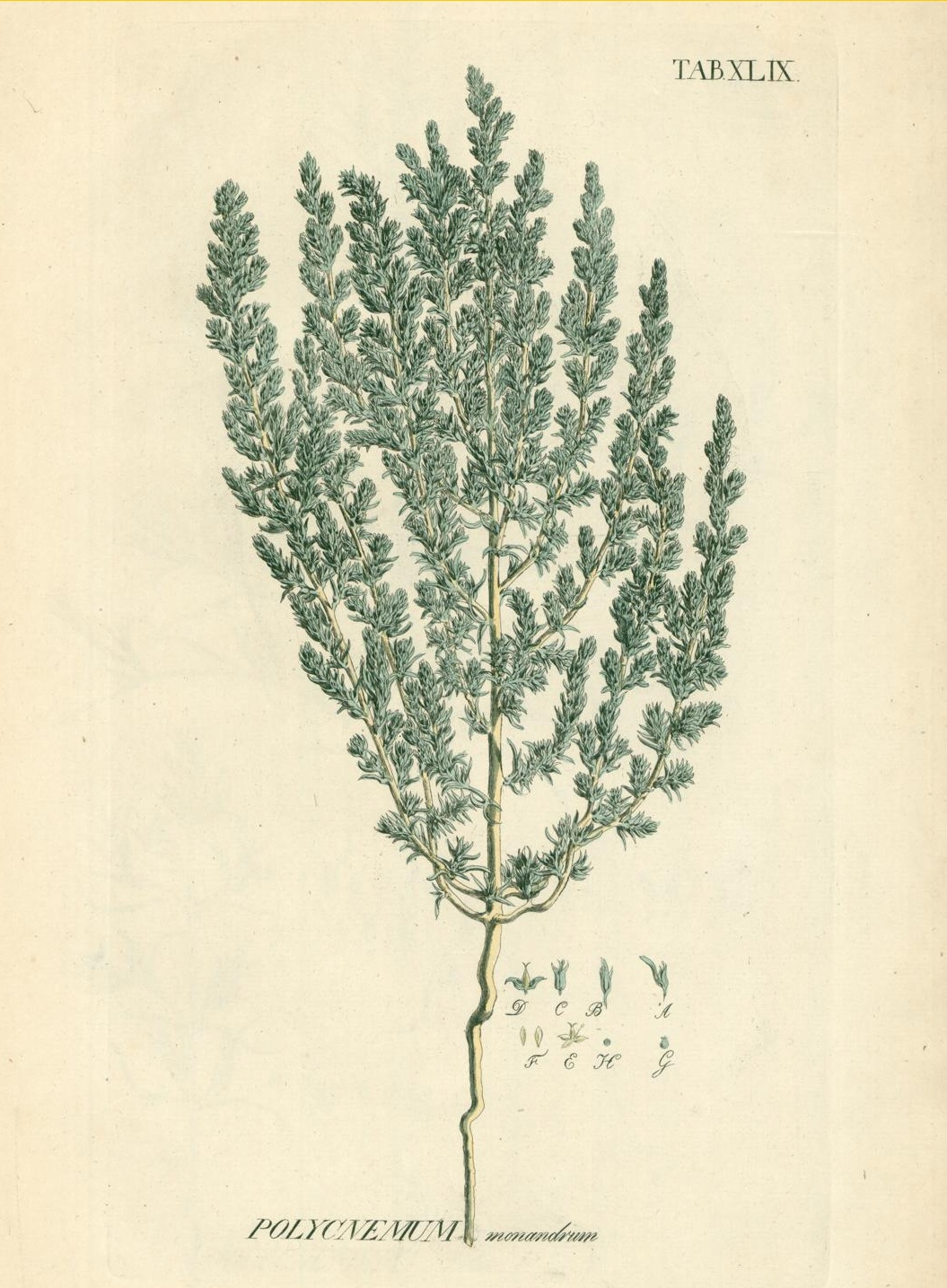
- Petrosimonia monandra

Scientific classification
- Kingdom: Plantae
- Clade: Tracheophytes
- Clade: Angiosperms
- Clade: Eudicots
- Order: Caryophyllales
- Family: Amaranthaceae
- Genus: Petrosimonia; Bunge

= Petrosimonia =

Genus of plants

Petrosimonia is a genus of flowering plants belonging to the family Amaranthaceae. It is also in the Salsoloideae tribe.

It is native to Albania, Bulgaria, Greece, Romania (in southeastern Europe), Central European Russia, Crimea South European Russia and Ukraine, (Eastern Europe), Altay, Irkutsk, Tuva and West Siberia, (in Siberia), North Caucasus, Transcaucasus, (in the Caucasus),

Kazakhstan, Kyrgyzstan, Tajikistan, Turkmenistan and Uzbekistan (in Central Asia) and Afghanistan, Iran, Lebanon, Mongolia, Syria and Turkey, (in Western Asia) and also Xinjiang in China.

The genus name of Petrosimonia is in honour of Peter Simon Pallas (1741–1811), a Prussian zoologist and botanist who worked in Russia (1767–1810). It was first described and published in Mém. Acad. Imp. Sci. Saint Pétersbourg, Sér. 7, Vol.4 (Issue 11) on page 52 in 1862.

== Known species ==
According to Kew:

- Petrosimonia brachiata (Pall.) Bunge
- Petrosimonia brachyphylla (Bunge) Iljin
- Petrosimonia glauca Bunge
- Petrosimonia glaucescens (Bunge) Iljin
- Petrosimonia hirsutissima (Bunge) Iljin ex Pavlov
- Petrosimonia litwinowii Korsh.
- Petrosimonia monandra (Pall.) Bunge
- Petrosimonia oppositifolia (Pall.) Litv.
- Petrosimonia sibirica (Pall.) Bunge
- Petrosimonia squarrosa (Schrenk) Bunge
- Petrosimonia triandra (Schrank) Rech.
