= Turania (plant) =

Scientific classification
- Kingdom: Plantae
- Clade: Tracheophytes
- Clade: Angiosperms
- Clade: Eudicots
- Order: Caryophyllales
- Family: Amaranthaceae
- Subfamily: Salsoloideae
- Genus: Turania; Akhani & Roalson (2007)

Species
- Turania androssowii (Litv.) Akhani; Turania aperta (Paulsen) Akhani; Turania deserticola (Iljin) Akhani; Turania sogdiana (Bunge) Akhani

Genus of flowering plants

Turania is a genus of flowering plants in the amaranth family, Amaranthaceae. It includes four species native to Central Asia, ranging from Iran and Afghanistan to Xinjiang and Kazakhstan.

- Turania androssowii (Litv.) Akhani – Turkmenistan and Uzbekistan
- Turania aperta (Paulsen) Akhani – Afghanistan, Iran, Kazakhstan, Tajikistan, Turkmenistan, Uzbekistan, and Xinjiang
- Turania deserticola (Iljin) Akhani – Turkmenistan and Uzbekistan
- Turania sogdiana (Bunge) Akhani – Kazakhstan, Turkmenistan, and Uzbekistan
