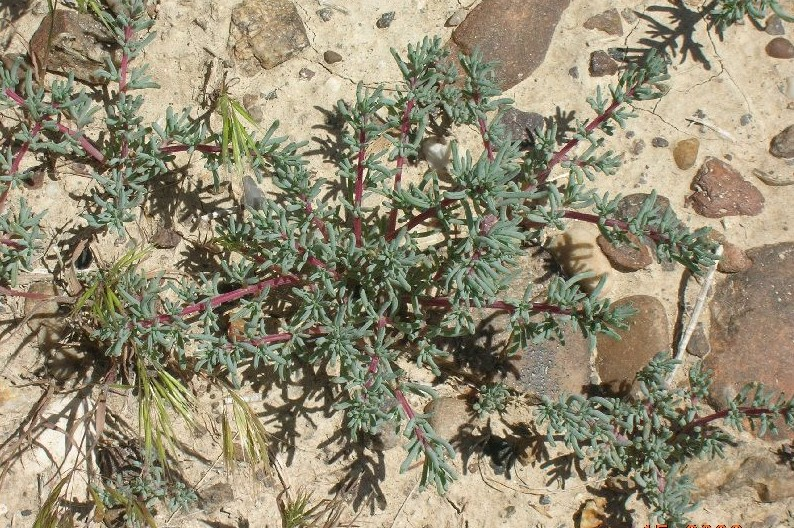

Scientific classification
- Kingdom: Plantae
- Clade: Tracheophytes
- Clade: Angiosperms
- Clade: Eudicots
- Order: Caryophyllales
- Family: Amaranthaceae
- Genus: Halogeton
- Species: H. glomeratus

Binomial name
- Halogeton glomeratus (M.Bieb.) C.A.Mey.

= Halogeton glomeratus =

Species of flowering plant

Halogeton glomeratus is a species of flowering plant in the family Amaranthaceae known by the common names saltlover, Aral barilla, and halogeton. It is native to Russia, Central Asia and China, but the plant is probably better known in the western United States, where it is an introduced species and a notorious noxious weed. This annual herb is a hardy halophyte, thriving in soils far too saline to support many other plants. It also grows in alkali soils such as those on alkali flats and disturbed, barren habitat. It can be found in sagebrush and shadscale habitat, and it grows well in areas with cold winters.

This plant produces a usually erect stem with several curving branches up to about 25 centimetres (9.8 inches) tall. It has a taproot reaching up to half a meter deep in the soil and many lateral roots. The branches are lined with narrow, fleshy, blue-green leaves each up to about 2 centimeters long tipped with stiff bristles. The inflorescences are located all along the stem branches next to the leaves. Each inflorescence is a small cluster of tiny bisexual and female-only flowers accompanied by waxy bracts. The winged, membranous flowers surround the developing fruit, which is all that remains on the plant when it is ripe, the leaves and flower parts having fallen away. The fruit is a pale cylindrical utricle. The plant produces large amounts of seeds, which are dispersed by many vehicles, including human activity, animals (including ants), water flow, wind, and by being carried on the dry plant when it breaks off at ground level and rolls away as a tumbleweed. The seeds have the ability to germinate within one hour after being exposed to water.

This herb is a pest on rangelands in the western United States. It has a high oxalate content, with up to 30% of the plant's dry weight made up of oxalate crystals, making it toxic to livestock that graze on it. It is especially toxic to sheep, which can be fatally poisoned by as little as twelve ounces (340 g) of the plant. Halogeton was first recognized as a danger to sheep in the 1940s after a rancher lost a herd of 160 sheep to poisoning. The oxalate causes acute hypocalcemia in the sheep, causing them to stagger, spasm, and finally die. Ingestion of a fatal dose of the plant can cause death in a sheep in under 12 hours. Ranchers often provide calcium-supplemented feed to sheep grazing on halogeton-infested land. Sheep are also able to adapt to halogeton in their diets over time, becoming sick from it less easily, and since it is hardly palatable they tend to avoid it in the first place when possible.

Halogeton is also destructive to the land of the American west because its excretion of mineral salts makes it harder for other plants to grow where it occurs. The growth of the plant is controlled by introducing certain nonnative plants, such as immigrant kochia (Kochia prostrata) and crested wheatgrass (Agropyron cristatum), which compete successfully with halogeton. Grazing practices are changed to assure that land is not denuded, since land which is disturbed by overgrazing is susceptible to halogeton invasion.
