= Saltwort =

Saltwort is a common name for various genera of flowering plants that thrive in salty environments, typically in coastal salt marshes and seashores, including:

- Salsola and related genera within subfamily Salsoloideae
- Salicornia
- Tecticornia
- Sarcocornia
- Suaeda
- Halogeton
- and others: the above genera are in the family Amaranthaceae, which contains certain other saltwort genera not mentioned above, but not all Amaranthaceae are saltworts.

- Batis, in the family Bataceae

The ashes of these plants yield soda ash, which is an important ingredient for glassmaking and soapmaking.

See also glasswort – glassworts are saltworts, and saltworts can be glassworts

See also Saltbush aka Atriplex, a genus thriving in salty environments
