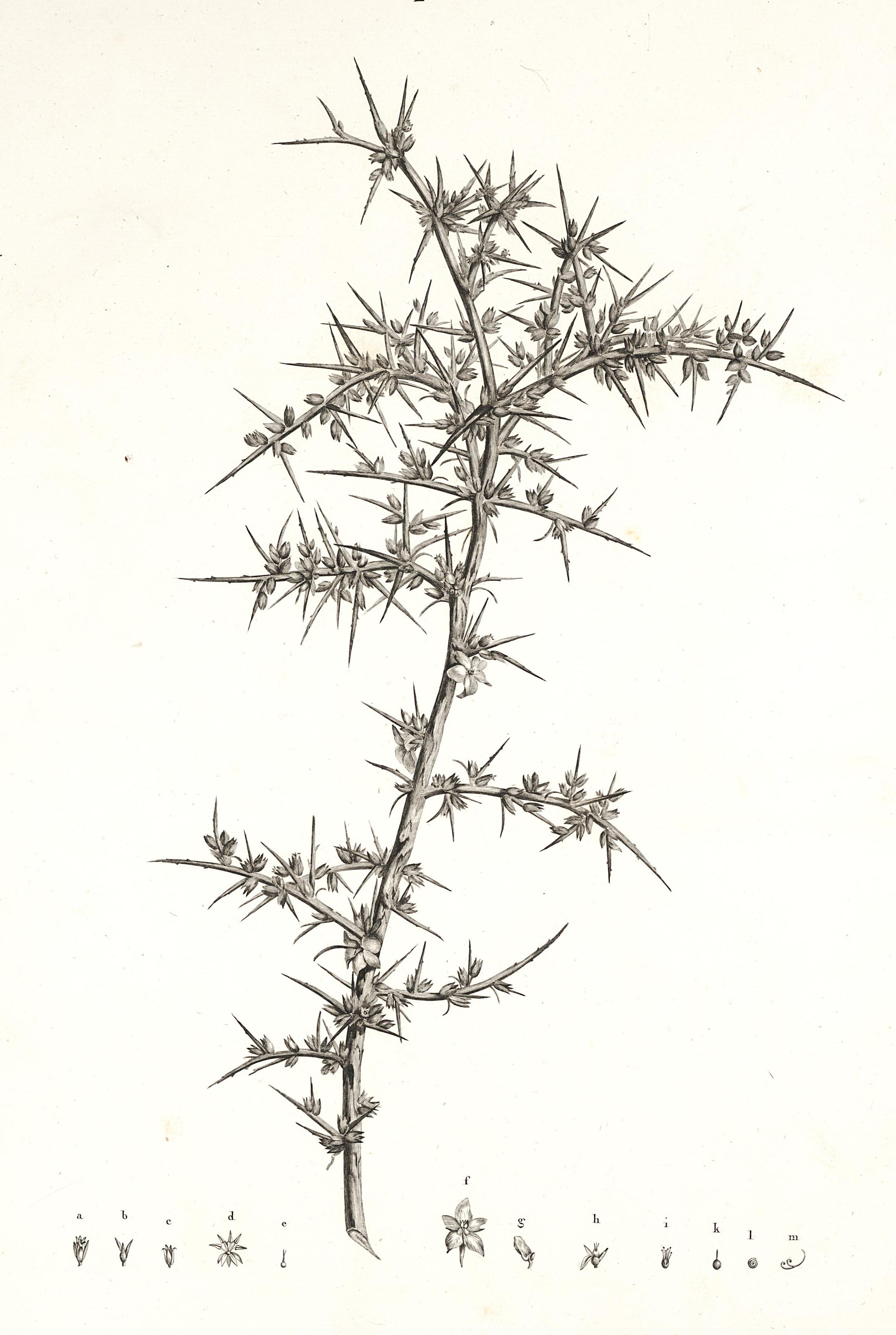
- Description de l'Égypte (Pl. 21) Salsola echinus.

Scientific classification
- Kingdom: Plantae
- Clade: Tracheophytes
- Clade: Angiosperms
- Clade: Eudicots
- Order: Caryophyllales
- Family: Amaranthaceae
- Genus: Noaea; Moq.

= Noaea =

Genus of flowering plant

Noaea is a genus of flowering plants belonging to the family Amaranthaceae. It is in the Salsoloideae subfamily.

Its native range is from the southern and eastern Mediterranean to Pakistan. It is found in Afghanistan, Algeria, Crete, Cyprus, East Aegean Islands, Egypt (including Sinai Peninsula,), Greece, Iran, Iraq, Lebanon, Libya, Morocco, North Caucasus region, Pakistan, Palestine, Saudi Arabia, Syria, Transcaucasus region (Armenia, Georgia and Azerbaijan), Turkey, Turkmenistan and Uzbekistan.

The genus name of Noaea is in honour of François Thomas "Frank", Marquis De Noé (1806–1887), a French author on North African Lamiaceae. It was first described and published in A.P.de Candolle, Prodr. Vol.13 (Issue 2) on page 207 in 1849.

== Known species ==
According to Kew:

- Noaea cadmea Yild.
- Noaea kurdica Eig
- Noaea major Bunge
- Noaea minuta Boiss. & Balansa
- Noaea mucronata (Forssk.) Asch. & Schweinf.
- Noaea tournefortii (Spach) Moq.
