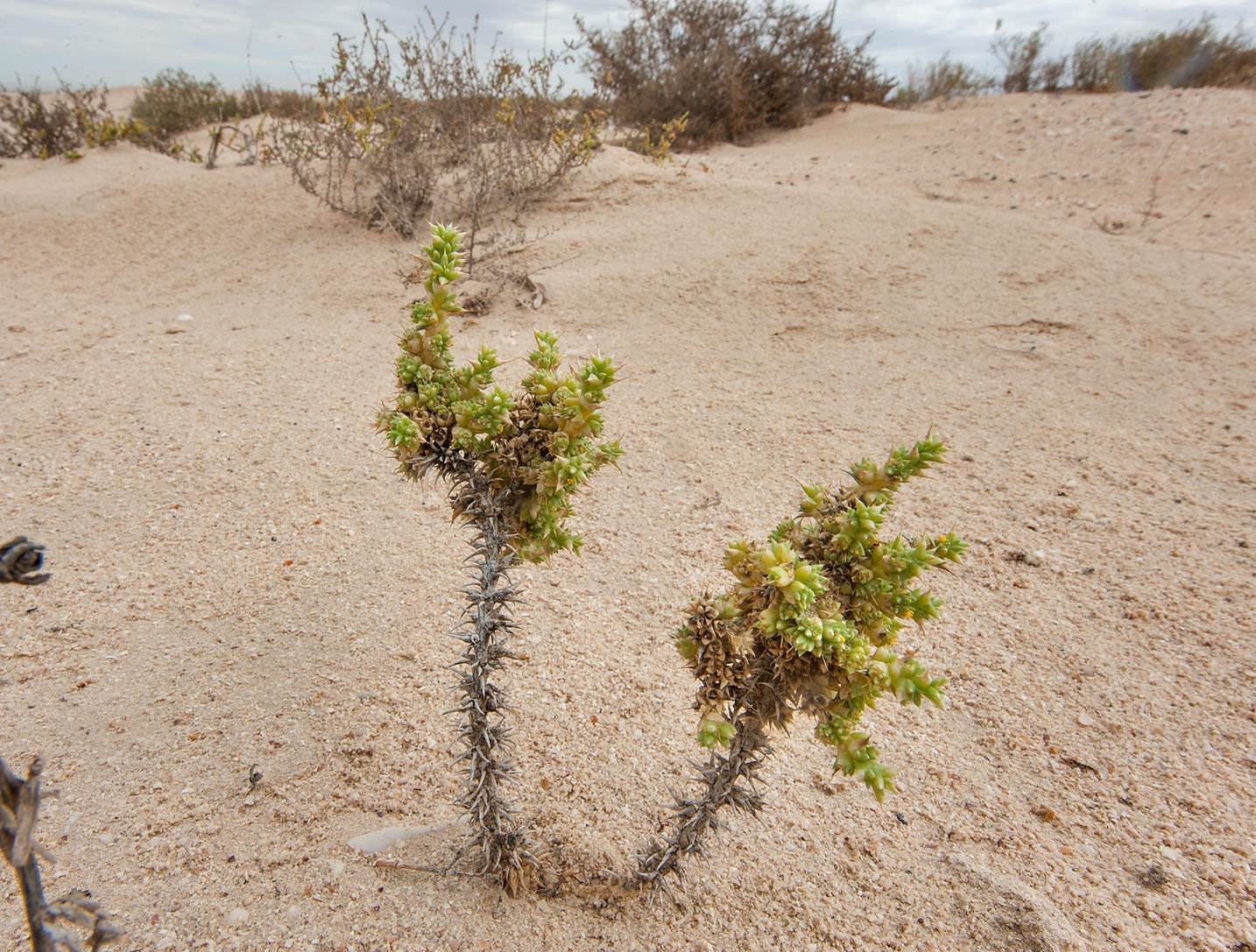
- Cornulaca aucheri on a beach in Qatar

Scientific classification
- Kingdom: Plantae
- Clade: Tracheophytes
- Clade: Angiosperms
- Clade: Eudicots
- Order: Caryophyllales
- Family: Amaranthaceae
- Genus: Cornulaca
- Species: C. aucheri

Binomial name
- Cornulaca aucheri Moq.

= Cornulaca aucheri =

Species of plant

Cornulaca aucheri is a native spiny undershrub of the family Amaranthaceae, naturally found in arid and semi-arid environments, especially across the Arabian Peninsula and North Africa.

== Description ==
This species is a low spiny undershrub with a thick, non‑succulent stem and rigid, deflexed leaves. Its stems branch from the base, attaining heights of 15–30 cm in Qatar. The plant’s foliage bears small, sharp leaves, and its flowers appear in clusters of 2–3 in upper axils. The fruiting perianth segments often taper into spines.

== Habitat ==
The species thrives in sandy soils, particularly along coastal dunes and sabkha margins. It occupies semi-stabilized sands and sandy flats.

== Distribution ==
Cornulaca aucheri ranges from North Africa to Pakistan, including the Arabian Peninsula.

== Ecological and local significance ==
The plant is traditionally used as fodder for camels, despite its spines.
