= Sympegma =

Scientific classification
- Kingdom: Plantae
- Clade: Tracheophytes
- Clade: Angiosperms
- Clade: Eudicots
- Order: Caryophyllales
- Family: Amaranthaceae
- Subfamily: Salsoloideae
- Tribe: Salsoleae
- Genus: Sympegma; Bunge

Species
- See text

Genus of plants in the amaranth family

Sympegma are a genus of flowering plants in the amaranth family Amaranthaceae, native to temperate Asia. Woody subshrubs, they are often the dominant species in the high (1,800 to 2,200 m) alkaline deserts in which they live.

== Species ==
Currently accepted species include:

- Sympegma elegans G.L.Chu
- Sympegma regelii Bunge
