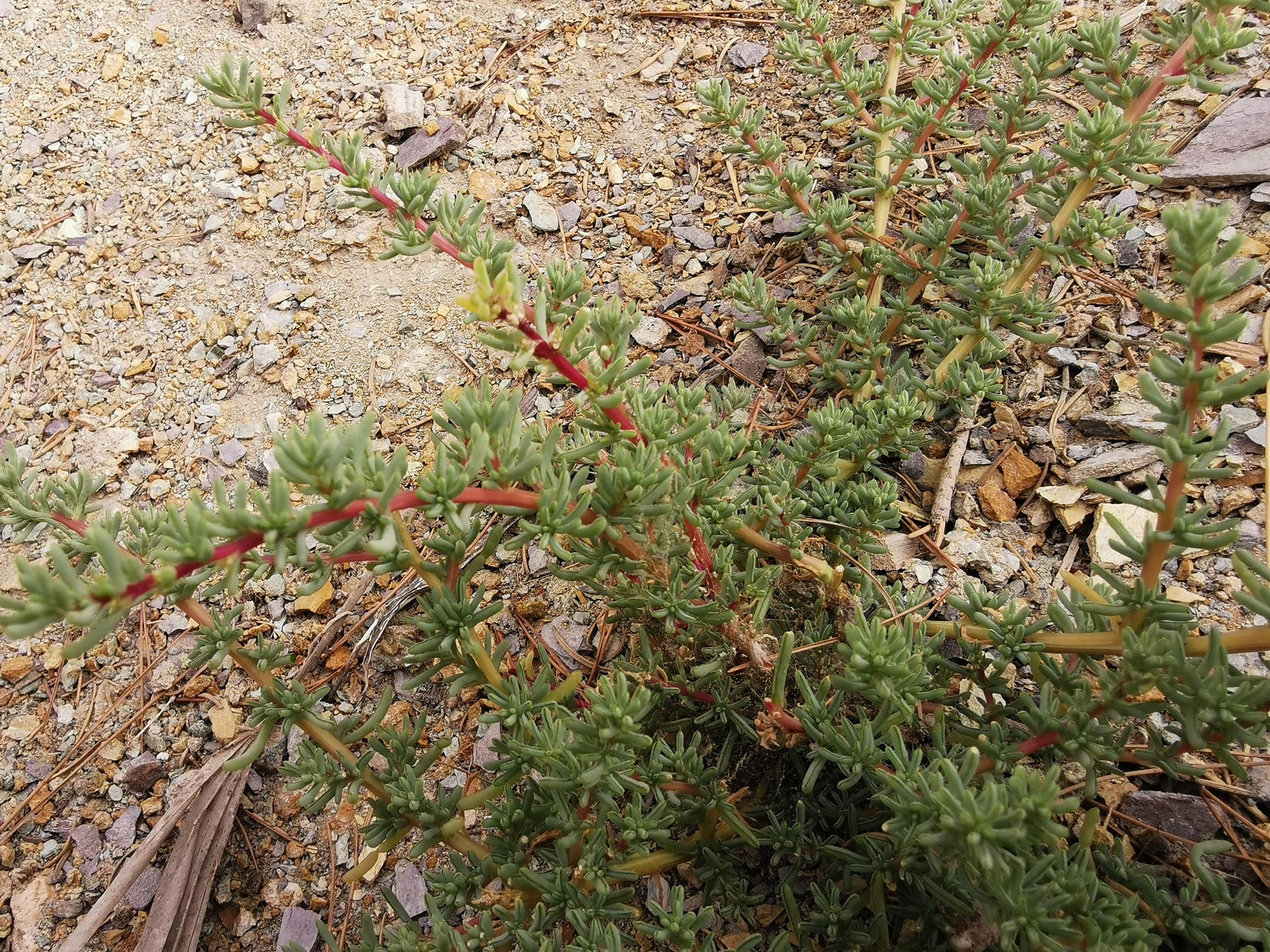
- Halogetun sativus in Cartagena (Spain).

Scientific classification
- Kingdom: Plantae
- Clade: Tracheophytes
- Clade: Angiosperms
- Clade: Eudicots
- Order: Caryophyllales
- Family: Amaranthaceae
- Genus: Halogeton
- Species: H. sativus

Binomial name
- Halogeton sativus (L.) Moq.

= Halogeton sativus =

Species of plant in the amaranth family

Halogeton sativus is a species of flowering plant in the family Amaranthaceae. It is native to Spain, Morocco and Algeria. Rich in salt, in the past it was cultivated to produce soda ash for glass-makers.
