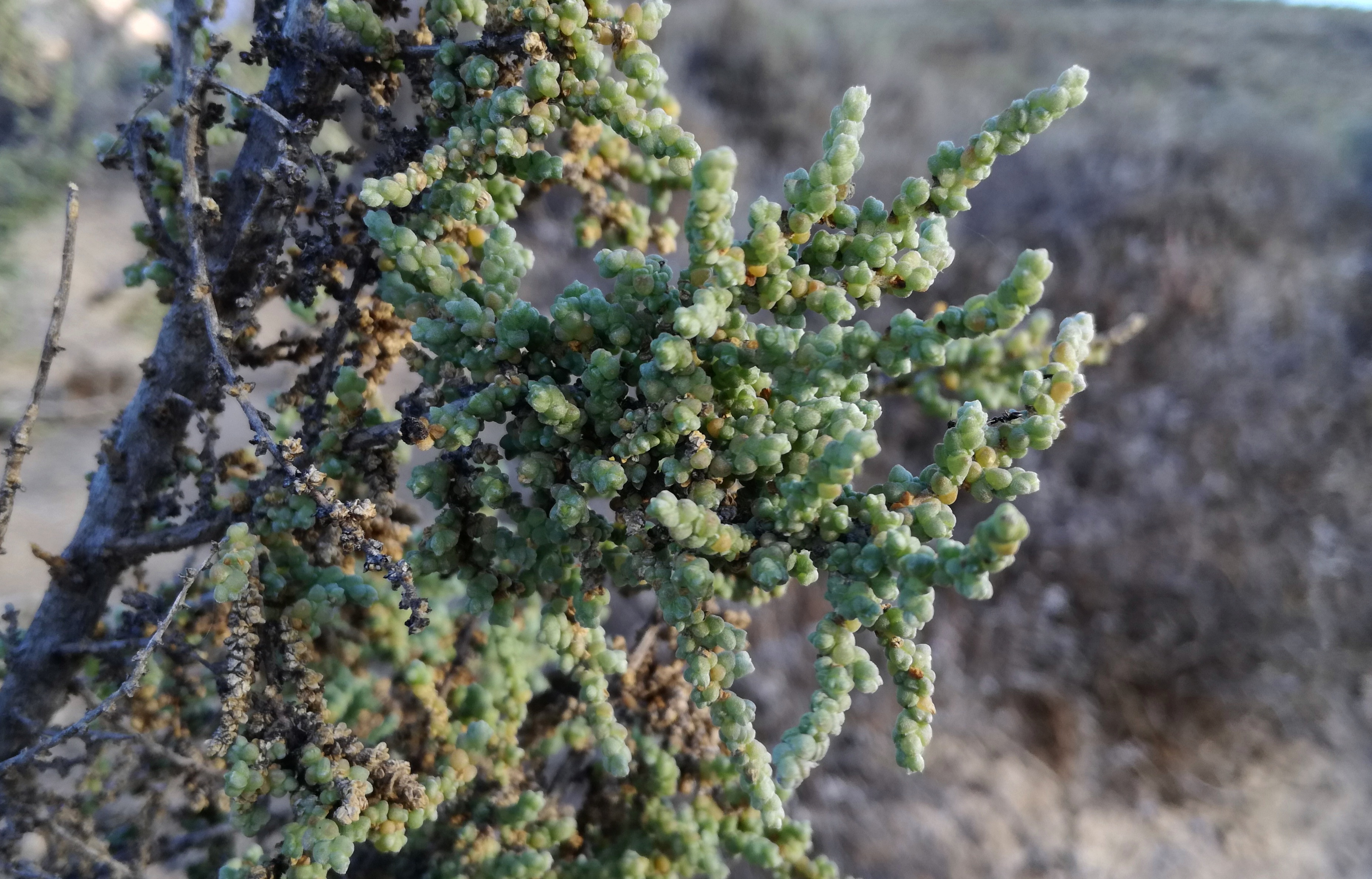
- Caroxylon aphyllum here given as Salsola aphylla

Scientific classification
- Kingdom: Plantae
- Clade: Embryophytes
- Clade: Tracheophytes
- Clade: Spermatophytes
- Clade: Angiosperms
- Clade: Eudicots
- Order: Caryophyllales
- Family: Amaranthaceae
- Subfamily: Salsoloideae
- Tribe: Caroxyleae
- Genus: Caroxylon; Thunb.

Species
- See text

Synonyms
- Muratina Maire; Nitrosalsola Tzvelev; Sarcomorphis Bojer ex Moq.

= Caroxylon =

Genus of plants in the amaranth family

Caroxylon is a genus of shrubby flowering plants in the family Amaranthaceae, found in drier areas of the Old World, including southern Africa, Madagascar, northern Africa, Mediterranean islands of Europe, the Canary Islands, Socotra, Ukraine, Russia, western Asia, Central Asia, India, western and northern China, and Mongolia.

== Species ==
Plants of the World Online currently (March 2024) includes:

1. Caroxylon abarghuense (Assadi) Akhani & Roalson
2. Caroxylon acocksii (Botsch.) Mucina
3. Caroxylon adiscum (Botsch.) Mucina
4. Caroxylon adversariifolium (Botsch.) Mucina
5. Caroxylon aegaeum (Rech.f.) Akhani & Roalson
6. Caroxylon aellenii (Botsch.) Mucina
7. Caroxylon agrigentinum (Guss.) C.Brullo, Brullo, Giusso, Guarino & Iamonico
8. Caroxylon albidum (Botsch.) Theodorova
9. Caroxylon albisepalum (Aellen) Mucina
10. Caroxylon aphyllum (L.f.) Tzvelev
11. Caroxylon apiciflorum (Botsch.) Mucina
12. Caroxylon apterygeum (Botsch.) Mucina
13. Caroxylon arabicum (Botsch.) Akhani & Roalson
14. Caroxylon araneosum (Botsch.) Akhani & Roalson
15. Caroxylon arboreum (C.A.Sm. ex Aellen) Mucina
16. Caroxylon armatum (C.A.Sm. ex Aellen) Mucina
17. Caroxylon aroabicum (Botsch.) Mucina
18. Caroxylon atratum (Botsch.) Mucina
19. Caroxylon barbatum (Aellen) Mucina
20. Caroxylon caffrum (Sparrm.) Mucina
21. Caroxylon calluna (Drège ex C.H.Wright) Theodorova ex Mucina
22. Caroxylon camphorosma (Iljin) Mosyakin
23. Caroxylon campylopterum (Botsch.) Mucina
24. Caroxylon cauliflorum (Botsch.) Mucina
25. Caroxylon ceresicum (Botsch.) Mucina
26. Caroxylon chorassanicum (Botsch.) Akhani & Roalson
27. Caroxylon columnare (Botsch.) Theodorova
28. Caroxylon contrariifolium (Botsch.) Mucina
29. Caroxylon cryptopterum (Aellen) Mucina
30. Caroxylon cyclophyllum (Baker) Akhani & Roalson
31. Caroxylon dealatum (Botsch.) Mucina
32. Caroxylon decussatum (C.A.Sm. ex Botsch.) Mucina
33. Caroxylon dendroides (Pall.) Tzvelev
34. Caroxylon denudatum (Botsch.) Mucina
35. Caroxylon dinteri (Botsch.) Mucina
36. Caroxylon divaricatum Moq.
37. Caroxylon dolichostigmum (Botsch.) Mucina
38. Caroxylon dzhungaricum (Iljin) Akhani & Roalson
39. Caroxylon ericoides (M.Bieb.) Akhani & Roalson
40. Caroxylon esterhuyseniae (Botsch.) Mucina
41. Caroxylon etoshense (Botsch.) Mucina
42. Caroxylon exalatum (Botsch.) Mucina
43. Caroxylon forcipitatum (Iljin) Akhani & Roalson
44. Caroxylon gaetulum (Maire) Akhani & Roalson
45. Caroxylon garubicum (Botsch.) Mucina
46. Caroxylon geminiflorum (Fenzl ex C.H.Wright) Mucina
47. Caroxylon gemmascens (Pall.) Tzvelev
48. Caroxylon gemmatum (Botsch.) Mucina
49. Caroxylon gemmiferum (Botsch.) Mucina
50. Caroxylon gemmiparum (Botsch.) Mucina
51. Caroxylon genistoides (Juss. ex Poir.) Pau
52. Caroxylon giessii (Botsch.) Mucina
53. Caroxylon glabrescens (Burtt Davy) Akhani & Roalson
54. Caroxylon glabrum (Botsch.) Mucina
55. Caroxylon henriciae (I.Verd.) Mucina
56. Caroxylon hoanibicum (Botsch.) Mucina
57. Caroxylon hottentotticum (Botsch.) Mucina
58. Caroxylon huabicum (Botsch.) Mucina
59. Caroxylon humifusum (C.A.Sm. ex A.E.Brueckner) Theodorova
60. Caroxylon iljinii (Botsch.) Akhani
61. Caroxylon imbricatum (Forssk.) Moq.
62. Caroxylon inapertum (Botsch.) Mucina
63. Caroxylon incanescens (C.A.Mey.) Akhani & Roalson
64. Caroxylon inerme (Forssk.) Akhani & Roalson
65. Caroxylon jordanicola (Eig) Akhani & Roalson
66. Caroxylon kalaharicum (Botsch.) Mucina
67. Caroxylon kleinfonteini (Botsch.) Mucina
68. Caroxylon koichabicum (Botsch.) Mucina
69. Caroxylon laricinum (Pall.) Tzvelev
70. Caroxylon littoralis (Moq.) Akhani & Roalson
71. Caroxylon marginatum (Botsch.) Mucina
72. Caroxylon melananthum (Botsch.) Mucina
73. Caroxylon merxmuelleri (Aellen) Mucina
74. Caroxylon micrantherum (Botsch.) Sukhor.
75. Caroxylon microtrichum (Botsch.) Mucina
76. Caroxylon minutifolium (Botsch.) Mucina
77. Caroxylon mirabile (Botsch.) Mucina
78. Caroxylon namaqualandicum (Botsch.) Mucina
79. Caroxylon namibicum (Botsch.) Mucina
80. Caroxylon nigrescens (C.A.Sm. ex I.Verd.) Mucina
81. Caroxylon nitrarium (Pall.) Akhani & Roalson
82. Caroxylon nodulosum Moq.
83. Caroxylon nollothense (Aellen) Mucina
84. Caroxylon okaukuejense (Botsch.) Mucina
85. Caroxylon omanense (Boulos) Freitag & G.Kadereit
86. Caroxylon omaruruense (Botsch.) Mucina
87. Caroxylon orientale (S.G.Gmel.) Tzvelev
88. Caroxylon parviflorum (Botsch.) Mucina
89. Caroxylon passerinum (Bunge) Akhani & Roalson
90. Caroxylon patentipilosum (Botsch.) Mucina
91. Caroxylon pearsonii (Botsch.) Mucina
92. Caroxylon persicum (Bunge ex Boiss.) Akhani & Roalson
93. Caroxylon phillipsii (Botsch.) Mucina
94. Caroxylon pillansii (Botsch.) Mucina
95. Caroxylon procerum (Botsch.) Mucina
96. Caroxylon ptilopterum (Botsch.) Mucina
97. Caroxylon pulvinatum (Botsch.) Akhani & Roalson
98. Caroxylon rabieanum (C.A.Sm. ex I.Verd.) Mucina
99. Caroxylon robinsonii (Botsch.) Mucina
100. Caroxylon roshevitzii (Iljin) Akhani & Roalson
101. Caroxylon ruschii (Aellen) Mucina
102. Caroxylon schreiberae (Botsch.) Mucina
103. Caroxylon scleranthum (C.A.Mey.) Akhani & Roalson
104. Caroxylon scopiforme (Botsch.) Mucina
105. Caroxylon seminudum (Botsch.) Mucina
106. Caroxylon sericatum (Botsch.) Mucina
107. Caroxylon seydelii (Botsch.) Mucina
108. Caroxylon smithii (Botsch.) Mucina
109. Caroxylon spenceri (Botsch.) Mucina
110. Caroxylon spinescens (Moq.) Akhani & Roalson
111. Caroxylon squarrosulum (Botsch.) Mucina
112. Caroxylon stenopterum (Wagenitz) Akhani & Roalson
113. Caroxylon swakopmundi (Botsch.) Mucina
114. Caroxylon tetragonum (Delile) Moq.
115. Caroxylon tetramerum (Botsch.) Mucina
116. Caroxylon tetrandrum (Forssk.) Akhani & Roalson
117. Caroxylon tuberculatiforme (Botsch.) Mucina
118. Caroxylon tuberculatum Moq.
119. Caroxylon turkestanicum (Litv.) Akhani & Roalson
120. Caroxylon ugabicum (Botsch.) Mucina
121. Caroxylon unjabicum (Botsch.) Mucina
122. Caroxylon verdoorniae (Toelken) Mucina
123. Caroxylon vermiculatum (L.) Akhani & Roalson
124. Caroxylon villosum (Schult.) Akhani & Roalson
125. Caroxylon volkensii (Schweinf. & Asch.) Akhani & Roalson
126. Caroxylon warmbadicum (Botsch.) Mucina
127. Caroxylon yazdianum (Assadi) Akhani & Roalson
128. Caroxylon zeyheri Moq.
