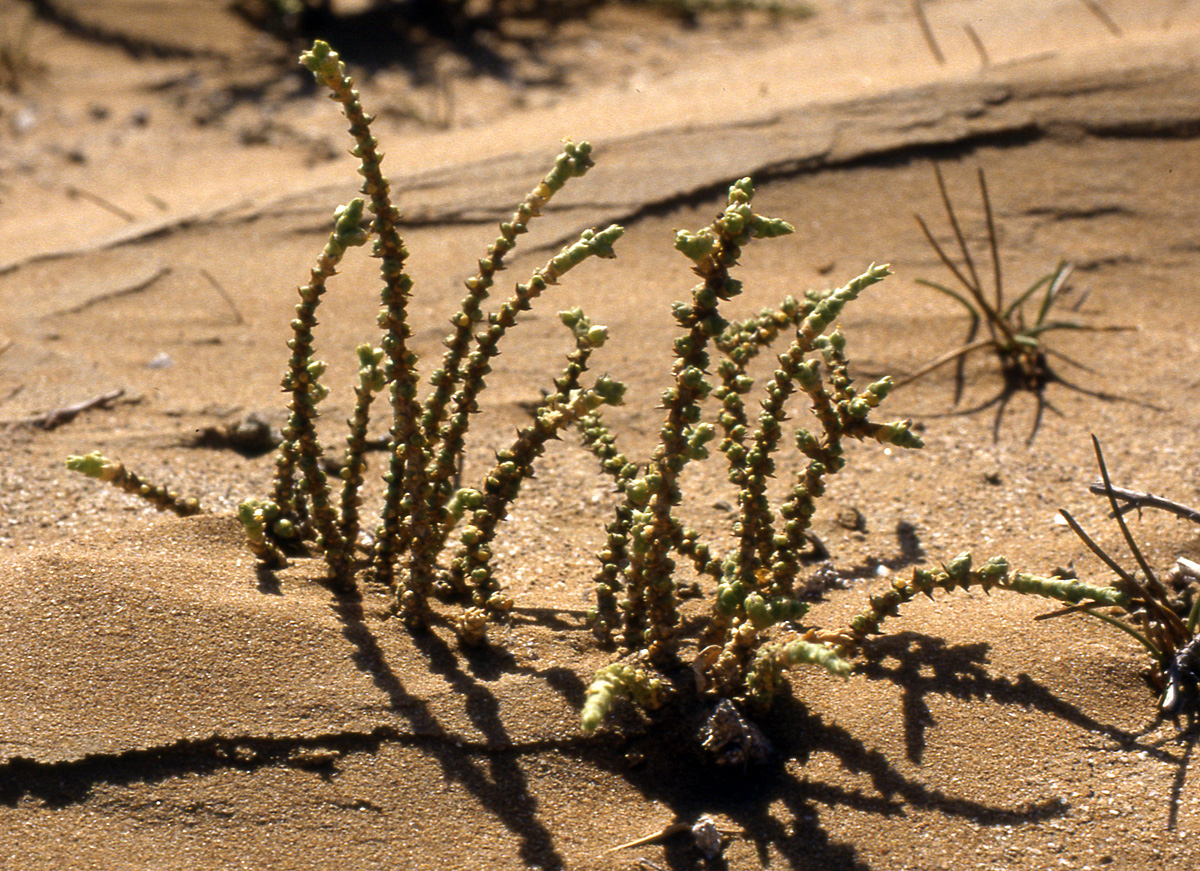

Scientific classification
- Kingdom: Plantae
- Clade: Tracheophytes
- Clade: Angiosperms
- Clade: Eudicots
- Order: Caryophyllales
- Family: Amaranthaceae
- Genus: Cornulaca
- Species: C. monacantha

Binomial name
- Cornulaca monacantha Delile 1813

= Cornulaca monacantha =

Species of flowering plant

Cornulaca monacantha is a species of flowering plant in the genus Cornulaca, that is now included in the family Amaranthaceae, (formerly Chenopodiaceae). It is a desert plant found in the Middle East and the Sahara, and the southern end of its range is considered to delineate the edge of the desert. In Arabic it is known as had and djouri, and the Tuareg people call it tahara. It was first described in 1813 by the French botanist Alire Raffeneau Delile.

== Description ==
Cornulaca monacantha is a straggling, branched, woody shrub growing to a height of 60 centimetres (24 in). The stubby bluish-green leaves are scale-like and clasp the greyish, wiry stems. They each have a single stiff spine at the tip, hence the specific name monacantha. The leaves turn yellow or white when the plant is dead. The orange-brown flowers appear singly in the woolly leaf axils between August and November. The calyx and petals are spiny, the perianth lobes being linear and leathery, with jagged tips. One petal in each flower extends downwards in a long spine. The seeds are held vertically in an erect, flattened seed pod. The plant is wind resistant and has a long taproot.

== Distribution and ecology ==
Cornulaca monacantha is native to North Africa, Arabia, the Middle East, Iran and Baluchistan. It is a desert plant and grows in arid conditions on sandy and stony ground. In Egypt, along the Mediterranean coast and in the western desert near oases it grows on sand dunes and in sandy depressions but not saline locations. Along with a low, cushion-shaped shrub, Zygophyllum album, it is the dominant plant in its community. Other plants found growing nearby were mostly grasses and members of the goosefoot family. The southern boundary of the range of Cornulaca monacantha in Africa is used to define the southern limit of the Sahara Desert.

== Uses ==
A decoction of the leaves of Cornulaca monacantha is used as a traditional medicine for jaundice and liver problems and as a purgative. Externally it is used to treat scabies. Despite its spiny leaves, it provides good grazing for camels and is said to increase the supply of milk produced by lactating females.
