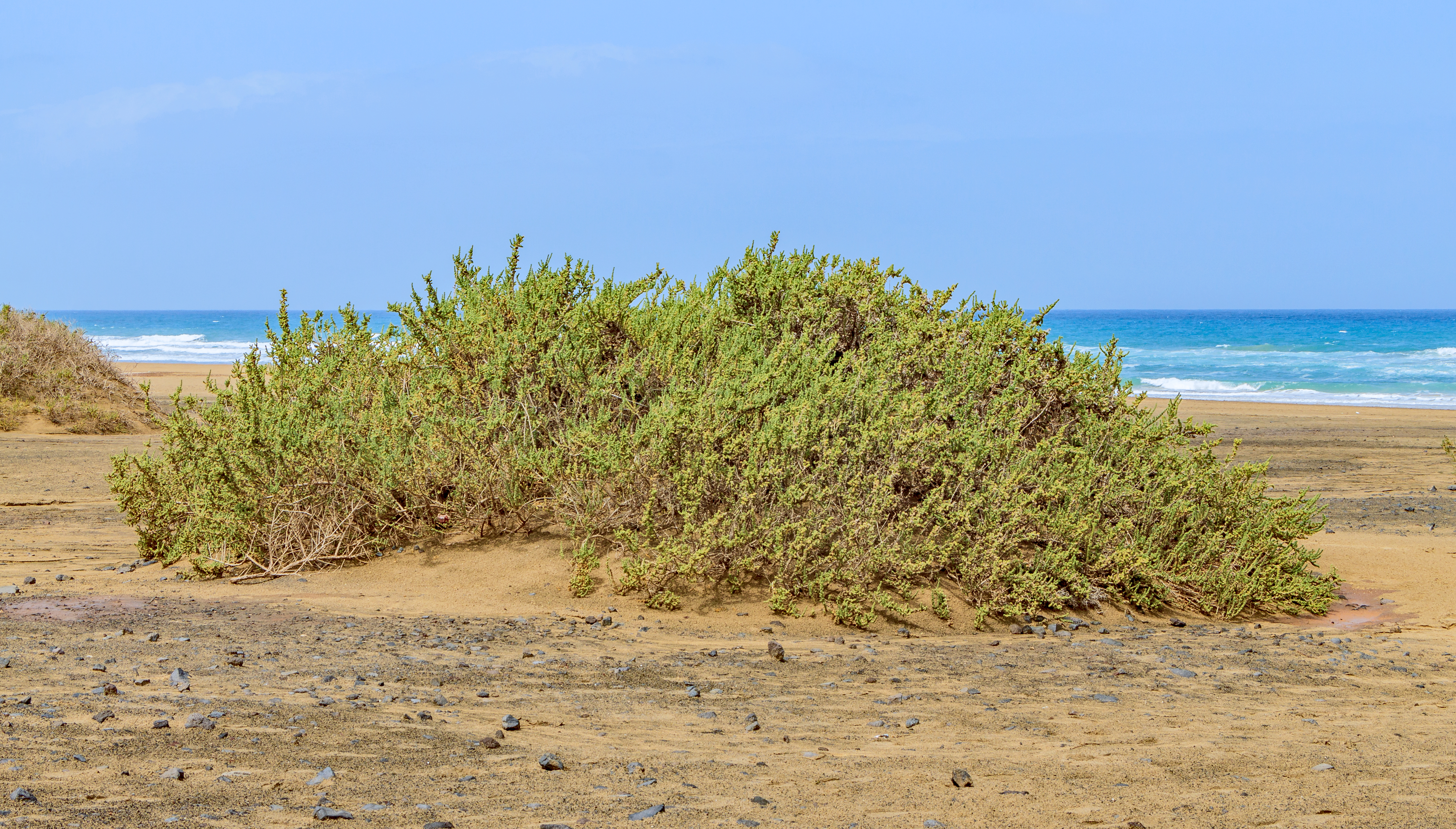
- Traganum moquinii in the Canary Islands

Scientific classification
- Kingdom: Plantae
- Clade: Tracheophytes
- Clade: Angiosperms
- Clade: Eudicots
- Order: Caryophyllales
- Family: Amaranthaceae
- Subfamily: Salsoloideae
- Tribe: Salsoleae
- Genus: Traganum; Delile

= Traganum =

Genus of flowering plants

Traganum is a genus of flowering plants belonging to the family Amaranthaceae.

Its native range is Macaronesia to Arabian Peninsula and Iraq.

Species:

- Traganum moquinii Webb ex Moq.
- Traganum nudatum Delile
