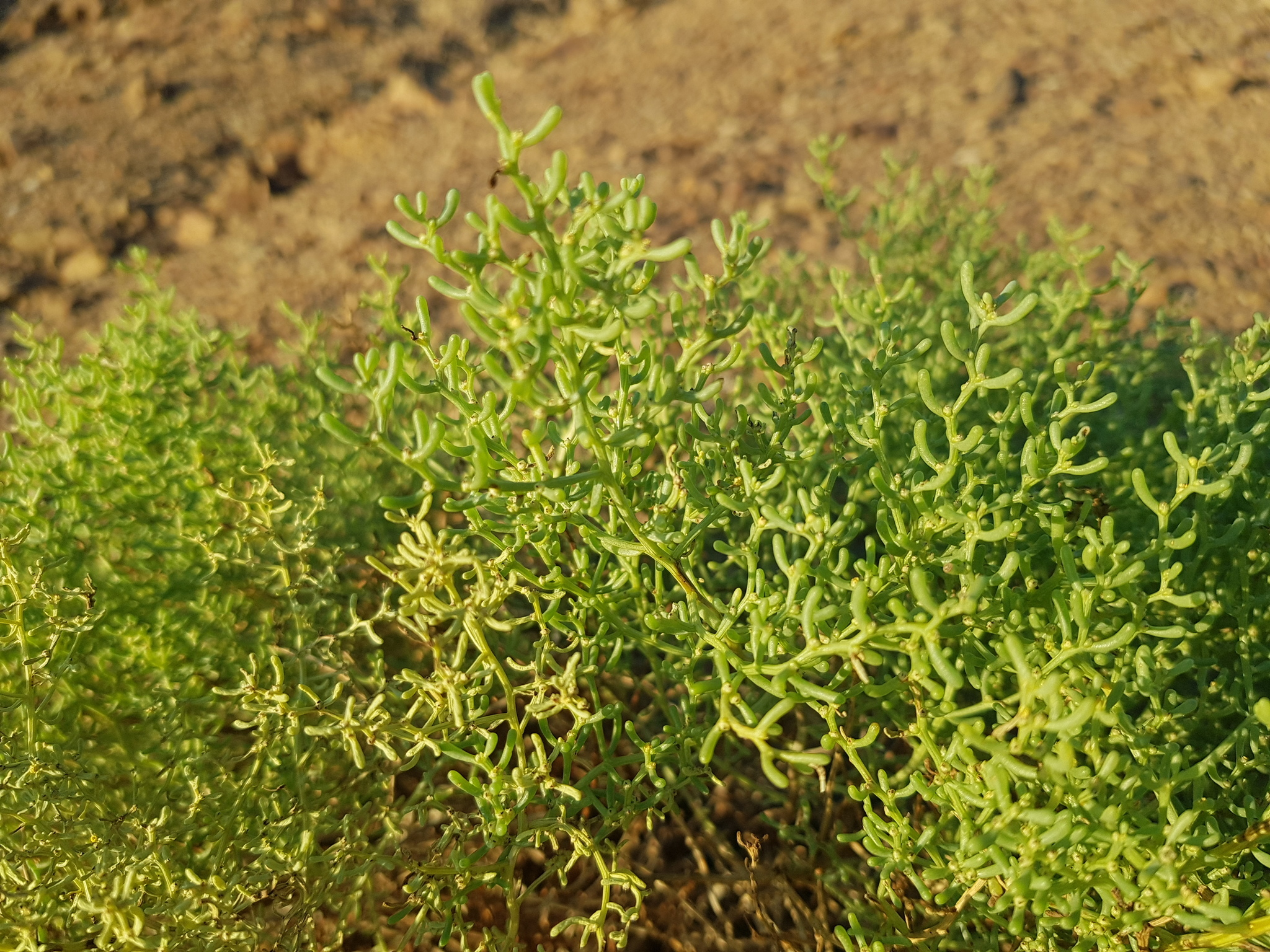

Scientific classification
- Kingdom: Plantae
- Clade: Tracheophytes
- Clade: Angiosperms
- Clade: Eudicots
- Order: Caryophyllales
- Family: Amaranthaceae
- Genus: Iljinia; Korovin ex Iljin (1936)
- Species: I. regelii

Binomial name
- Iljinia regelii (Bunge) Korovin ex Iljin (1936)

Synonyms
- Arthrophytum regelii (Bunge) Litv. (1912); Haloxylon regelii Bunge (1879); Salsola regelii Litv. ex Popov (1922)

= Iljinia =

Genus of plants

Iljinia is a monotypic genus of flowering plants belonging to the family Amaranthaceae. It only contains one species, Iljinia regelii (Bunge) Korovin ex Iljin

Its native range is from Central Asia to Mongolia and northern China. It is found in the countries of China (within Xinjiang), Kazakhstan, Kyrgyzstan, Mongolia, Tajikistan, Turkmenistan and Uzbekistan.

The genus name of Iljinia is in honour of Modest Ilín (1889–1967), Russian botanist and naturalist, who taught at the university and botanical garden in Saint Petersburg and was a specialist in Chenopodiaceae and Asteraceae. The Latin specific epithet of regelii refers to botanist Eduard August von Regel. Both genus and species were first described and published in V. L. Komarov (ed.), Fl. URSS Vol.6 on pages 877-878 in 1936.
