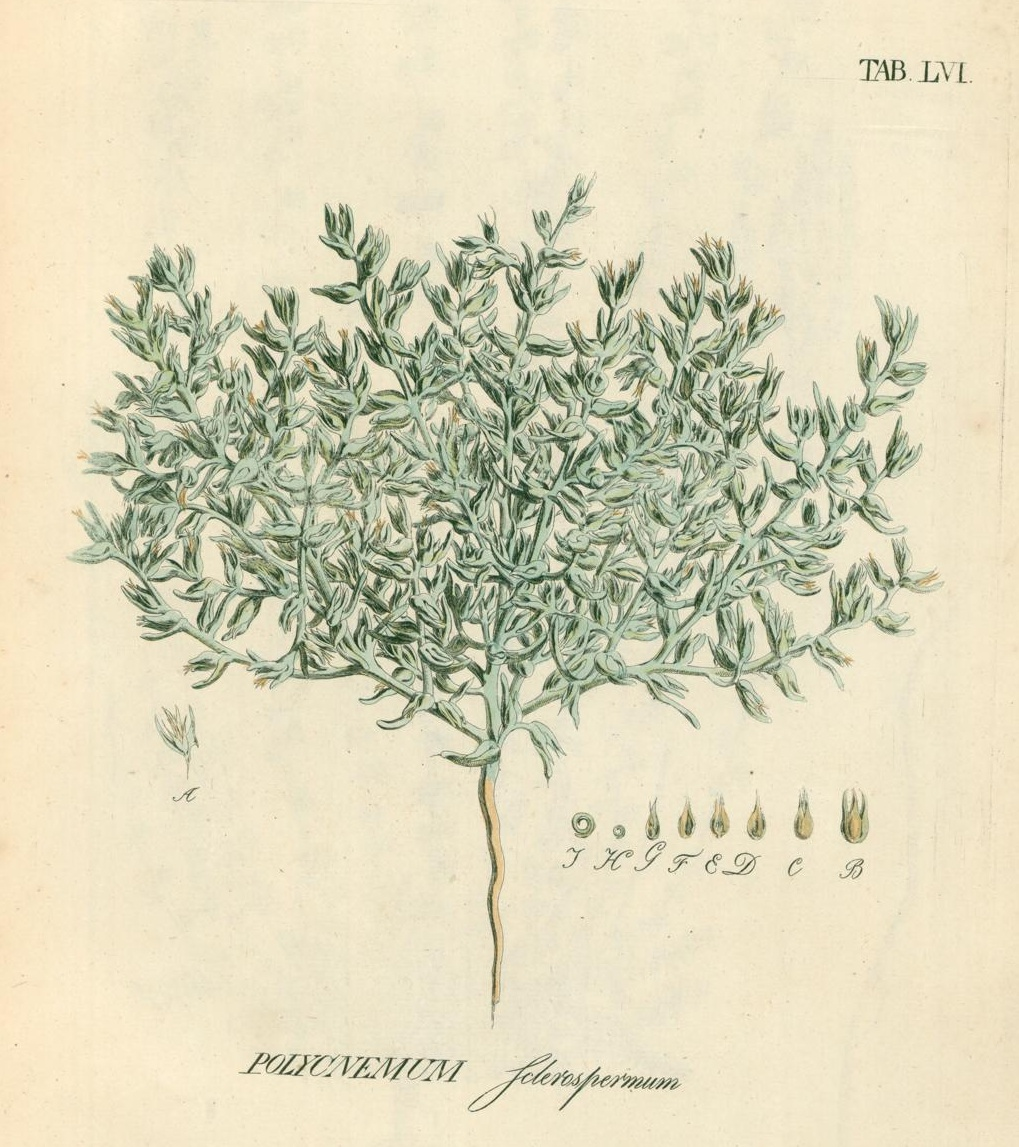

Scientific classification
- Kingdom: Plantae
- Clade: Tracheophytes
- Clade: Angiosperms
- Clade: Eudicots
- Order: Caryophyllales
- Family: Amaranthaceae
- Genus: Halimocnemis; C.A.Mey. (1829)

Synonyms
- Gamanthus Bunge (1862); Halotis Bunge (1862)

= Halimocnemis =

Genus of plants

Halimocnemis is a genus of flowering plants belonging to the family Amaranthaceae.

Its native range is Eastern Mediterranean to Xinjiang and Afghanistan.

Species:

- Halimocnemis azarbaijanensis Assadi
- Halimocnemis beresinii Iljin
- Halimocnemis commixtus (Bunge) Akhani
- Halimocnemis ferganica (Iljin) Akhani ex Sennikov
- Halimocnemis gamocarpa Moq.
- Halimocnemis glaberrima Iljin
- Halimocnemis karelinii Moq.
- Halimocnemis lasiantha Iljin
- Halimocnemis latifolia Iljin
- Halimocnemis leucophysa (Botsch.) Akhani
- Halimocnemis longifolia Bunge
- Halimocnemis macrantha Bunge
- Halimocnemis malacophylla (M.Bieb.) C.A.Mey.
- Halimocnemis mironovii Botsch.
- Halimocnemis mollissima Bunge
- Halimocnemis occulta (Bunge) Hedge
- Halimocnemis pedunculata (Assadi) Akhani
- Halimocnemis pilifera Moq.
- Halimocnemis sclerosperma (Pall.) C.A.Mey.
- Halimocnemis smirnowii Bunge
- Halimocnemis villosa Kar. & Kir.
