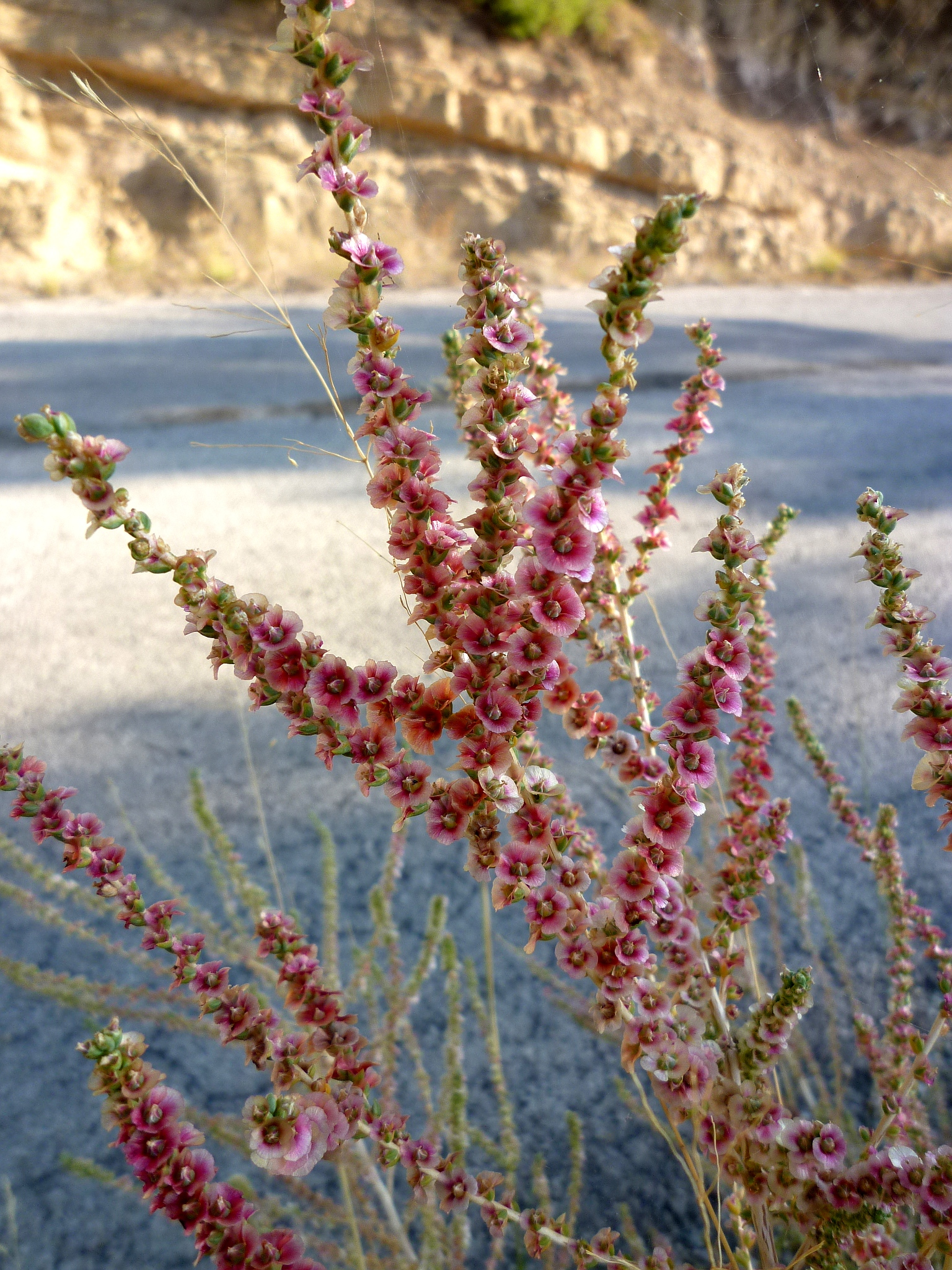

Scientific classification
- Kingdom: Plantae
- Clade: Embryophytes
- Clade: Tracheophytes
- Clade: Spermatophytes
- Clade: Angiosperms
- Clade: Eudicots
- Order: Caryophyllales
- Family: Amaranthaceae
- Genus: Caroxylon
- Species: C. vermiculatum

Binomial name
- Caroxylon vermiculatum (L.) Akhani & Roalson

Synonyms
- Chenopodium flavescens (Cav.) Schult.; Nitrosalsola hispanica (Botsch.) Theodorova; Nitrosalsola portilloi (Caball.) Theodorova; Nitrosalsola rodinii (Botsch.) Theodorova; Nitrosalsola vermiculata (L.) Theodorova; Salsola buxifolia Dum.Cours.; Salsola ericifolia Masson ex Link; Salsola flavescens Cav.; Salsola frankenioides (Caball.) Botsch.; Salsola hispanica Botsch.; Salsola microphylla Cav.; Salsola portilloi Caball.; Salsola rodinii Botsch.; Salsola tamariscifolia Lag.; Salsola vermiculata L.

= Caroxylon vermiculatum =

Species of flowering plant

Caroxylon vermiculatum, commonly known as Mediterranean saltwort, is a perennial plant in the family Amaranthaceae. It has many synonyms, including Salsola vermiculata and Nitrosalsola vermiculata. It is native to arid and semi-arid regions of the Middle East, North Africa and southern Europe where it is used as a fodder plant for livestock.

== Description ==
Caroxylon vermiculatum is a small, greyish, much-branched shrub ranging in height from 25 to 100 cm (10 to 40 in). The branches themselves branch repeatedly and are wiry and woody at the base. The leaves are tiny and scale-like, clasping the stem and covered with minute hairs. The inflorescence is a leafy spike with solitary flowers in the axils of the leaves. The flowers have persistent, pinkish, winged sepals and no petals and are about 10 mm (0.4 in) in diameter.

== Taxonomy ==
The species was first described, as Salsola vermiculata, in 1753 by Carl Linnaeus in Species Plantarum. Phylogenetic research led to the re-circumscription of the genus Salsola, and in 2007, the species was transferred to Caroxylon vermiculatum (L.) Akhani & Roalson. In 2015, it was transferred to Nitrosalsola vermiculata (L.) Theodorova. As of April 2022, the accepted name in Plants of the World Online is Caroxylon vermiculatum.

== Distribution and habitat ==
This plant is native to Syria, Lebanon, Israel, Jordan and Saudi Arabia, as well as Egypt and Morocco. It is also native to southern Europe, including Italy, Spain and Portugal. Its natural habitat is semi-arid and arid grassland, and it has been introduced to Pakistan and to California to provide forage in arid locations. In California it has become a weed and is regarded as an invasive species.

== Ecology ==
Caroxylon vermiculatum is part of the climax community in the Syrian steppe where it grows alongside Artemisia herba-alba, Atriplex leucoclada and Stipa barbata. It also grows on the Jordanian steppe along with Artemisia herba-alba and Achillea fragrantissima, but all three of these useful fodder species are becoming increasingly rare because of overgrazing. Exclusion of livestock from an area produces a large increase in the biomass of these species. It has a high protein content and is of high value as a forage crop in arid areas. It is planted in the Middle East for grazing by cattle, sheep, goats and camels.

Natural regeneration occurs in both spring and autumn, but plants germinating in autumn are more drought tolerant and more likely to become established. Rainwater harvesting, in the form of contouring furrows that prevent run-off, increases the successful establishment and growth of C. vermiculatum. Planting this and other native species, such as Atriplex halimus, shows high potential for the improvement of the Badia rangelands in Syria. Prolonged drought sometimes caused the plants to shed their leaves.

In California, C. vermiculatum has been shown to be an alternate host for the plant viruses that cause curly top, a disease of sugar beet, tomatoes and cucurbits.
