= Kali (plant) =

Former genus of flowering plants

Kali was a genus of plants in the subfamily Salsoloideae in the family Amaranthaceae, that has now been subsumed into the genus Salsola.

Common names of various members of this genus include buckbush, rolypoly, tumbleweed for its wind-blown seed dispersal habit, and Tartar thistle and Russian thistle for its origins.

== Taxonomy ==
The type species of the genus was Kali turgidum (now Salsola kali). The genus consisted of ca. 23 species, including:

- Kali australe (R.Br.) Akhani & E.H.Roalson = Salsola kali R.Br.
- Kali basalticum C.Brullo, Brullo, Gaskin, Giusso, Hrusa & Salmeri = Salsola basaltica (C.Brullo, Brullo, Gaskin, Giusso, Hrusa & Salmeri) C.Brullo & Brullo
- Kali collinum (Pall.) Akhani & E.H.Roalson = Salsola collina Pall.
- Kali dodecanesicum C.Brullo, Brullo, Giusso, Ilardi = Salsola squarrosa Steven ex Moq.
- Kali gobicola (Iljin) Brullo & Hrusa (2015) = Salsola × gobicola Iljin
- Kali griffithii (Bunge) Akhani & E.H.Roalson = Salsola griffithii (Bunge) Freitag & Khani
- Kali jacquemontii (Moq.) Akhani & E.H.Roalson = Salsola jacquemontii Moq.
- Kali ikonnikovii (Iljin) Akhani & E.H.Roalson = Salsola ikonnikovii Iljin
- Kali komarovii (Iljin) Akhani & E.H.Roalson = Salsola komarovii Iljin
- Kali macrophyllum (R.Br.) Galasso & Bartolucci = Salsola australis R.Br.
- Kali monopterum (Bunge) Lomon. = Salsola monoptera Bunge
- Kali nepalensis (Grubov) Brullo, Giusso & Hrusa (2015) = Salsola jacquemontii Moq.
- Kali paulsenii (Litv.) Akhani & E.H.Roalson = Salsola paulsenii Litv.
- Kali pellucidum (Litv.) Brullo, Giusso & Hrusa = Salsola paulsenii Litv.
- Kali praecox (Litv.) Sukhor. = Salsola praecox (Litv.) Litv.
- Kali rosaceum (L.) Moench = Noaea rosacea (L.) Sennikov
- Kali sinkiangense (A.J.Li) Brullo, Giusso & Hrusa = Salsola sinkiangensis A.J.Li
- Kali ryanii (Hrusa & Gaskin) Brullo & Hrusa = Salsola ryanii Hrusa & Gaskin
- Kali tamamschjanae (Iljin) Akhani & E.H.Roalson = Salsola tamamschjanae Iljin
- Kali tamariscinum (Pall.) Akhani & E.H.Roalson = Salsola tamariscina Pall.
- Kali turgidum (Dumort.) Guterm. = Salsola kali L.
- Kali zaidamicum (Iljin) Akhani & E.H.Roalson = Salsola zaidamica Iljin

In 2014, Mosyakin et al. proposed to conserve Salsola kali (= Kali turgidum) as nomenclatoral type for the genus Salsola. If the proposal will be accepted, all species of genus Kali would belong to Salsola again. The General Committee of the XIX International Botanical Congress approved Mosyakin et al.'s proposal, rendering the species related to Salsola kali as constituting the genus Salsola, while those related to Salsola soda should be transferred to another genus.
