= Russian thistle =

Russian thistle is a common name that can refer to:

- Echinops exaltatus, also known as Russian globe thistle, is a globe thistle native to Eurasia and an invasive species in Eastern Canada and Northern United States.
- Salsola tragus, formerly called Kali tragus or Salsola kali subsp. tragus: a common weed of disturbed habitats, commonly known as prickly Russian thistle. In the United States, it is the most common and most conspicuous species colloquially called "tumbleweed". It is an invasive species that is widespread throughout North America and many other continents.
- Salsola soda, also known as oppositeleaf Russian thistle.

== See also ==
- Tumbleweed, a diaspore formed by several Salsola species
