= Kali soda =

Kali soda may refer to:

- Kali soda (L.) Scop., a synonym of Soda inermis
- Kali soda Moench, an invalid name and synonym of Salsola kali
