= Coleophora pagodella =

Scientific classification
- Kingdom: Animalia
- Phylum: Arthropoda
- Class: Insecta
- Order: Lepidoptera
- Family: Coleophoridae
- Genus: Coleophora
- Species: C. pagodella

Binomial name
- Coleophora pagodella Falkovitsh, 1973

Species of insect

Coleophora pagodella is a moth of the family Coleophoridae. It is found in Turkestan and Uzbekistan.

The wingspan is about 12 mm.

The larvae feed on the fruit of Salsola species, including Salsola orientalis.
