= Coleophora psamata =

Scientific classification
- Kingdom: Animalia
- Phylum: Arthropoda
- Class: Insecta
- Order: Lepidoptera
- Family: Coleophoridae
- Genus: Coleophora
- Species: C. psamata

Binomial name
- Coleophora psamata Falkovitsh, 1973

Species of moth

Coleophora psamata is a moth of the family Coleophoridae. It is found in Turkestan and Uzbekistan.

The wingspan is 18–20 mm.

The larvae feed on Salsola species, including Salsola orientalis. The length of the case is 11–13 mm and it is yellowish-gray in color. Larvae can be found from the end of September to October.
