= Euxoa pleuritica =

Scientific classification
- Kingdom: Animalia
- Phylum: Arthropoda
- Class: Insecta
- Order: Lepidoptera
- Superfamily: Noctuoidea
- Family: Noctuidae
- Genus: Euxoa
- Species: E. pleuritica

Binomial name
- Euxoa pleuritica (Grote, 1876)

Synonyms
- Agrotis pleuritica Grote, 1876; Carneades messoria var. confracta Smith, 1890; Carneades confracta (Smith, 1890)

Species of moth

Euxoa pleuritica, the fawn brown dart, is a moth of the family Noctuidae. It is found in southern Canada and the northern United States from southern Quebec and eastern Massachusetts west to British Columbia and southern Washington. In the Rocky Mountain region it occurs as far south as northern New Mexico, north-eastern Arizona and central Idaho. It is listed as a species of special concern in Connecticut.

The wingspan is 34–38 mm. Adults are on wing from June to August. There is one generation per year.

The larvae have been reared on Salsola kali.
