= Afrosalsola =

Scientific classification
- Kingdom: Plantae
- Clade: Tracheophytes
- Clade: Angiosperms
- Clade: Eudicots
- Order: Caryophyllales
- Family: Amaranthaceae
- Subfamily: Salsoloideae
- Tribe: Salsoleae
- Genus: Afrosalsola; Akhani

Genus of flowering plants

Afrosalsola is a genus of flowering plants in the family Amaranthaceae. It includes two species of subshrubs or shrubs native to the Canary Islands, Morocco, Mauritania, and Western Sahara.

- Afrosalsola deschaseauxiana (Litard. & Maire) Akhani
- Afrosalsola divaricata (Masson ex Link) Akhani

They are shrubby halophytic plants with opposite and alternate branches and leaves. They have a distinct leaf anatomy with a hypodermis and kranz-like cells that perform C_{2} photosynthesis, a C_{3}-C_{4} intermediate photosynthetic pathway. The species were formerly included in the genus Salsola, which was found to be polyphyletic. In 2024 Hossein Akhani et al. described the new genus Afrosalsola to include the two species.
