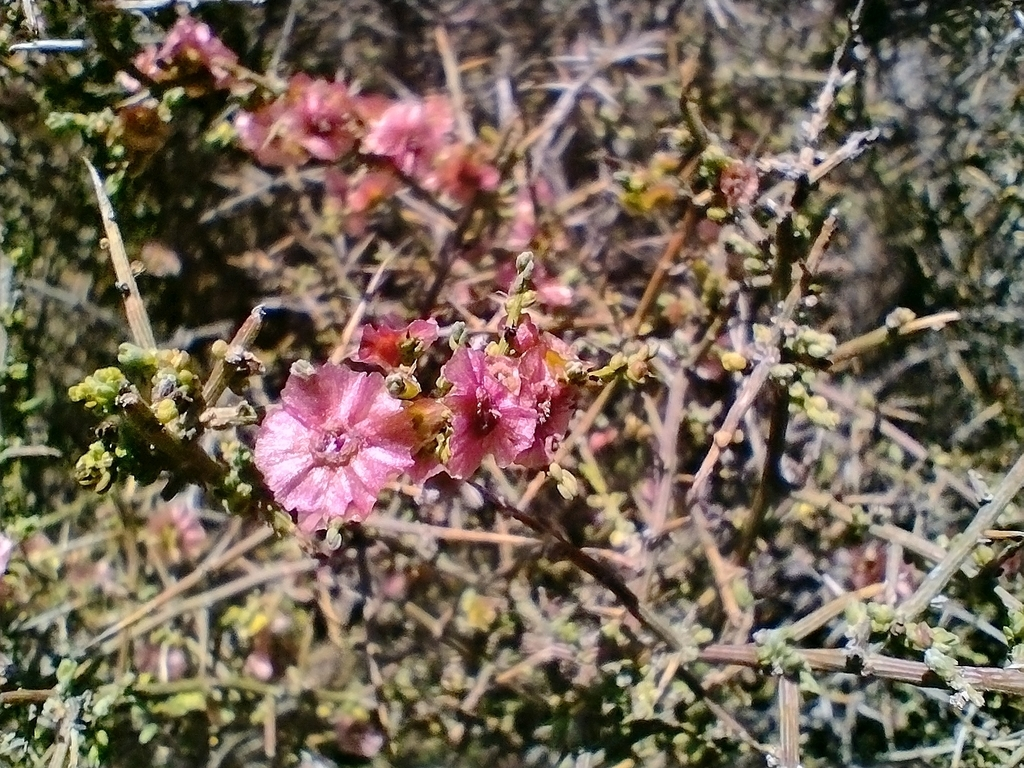

Scientific classification
- Kingdom: Plantae
- Clade: Embryophytes
- Clade: Tracheophytes
- Clade: Spermatophytes
- Clade: Angiosperms
- Clade: Eudicots
- Order: Caryophyllales
- Family: Amaranthaceae
- Genus: Salsola
- Species: S. australis

Binomial name
- Salsola australis R.Br.

Synonyms
- Kali australe (R.Br.) Akhani & Roalson; Kali macrophyllum (R.Br.) Galasso & Bartolucci; Salsola kali subsp. marginata (L.) Čelak.; Salsola macrophylla R.Br.; Salsola tragus var. australis (R.Br.) Bég.

= Salsola australis =

Species of flowering plant

Salsola australis, commonly known as the buckbush, rolypoly, soft rolypoly, or prickly saltwort, and has the Pitjantjatjara Yankunytjatjara name Tjilkala is a species of flowering plant in the genus Salsola. And is found in all regions of Australia.

== Description ==
Salsola australis is a small annual spiky plant that grows tall or as a hemisphere from 60 to 100 cm (24 to 39 in) tall. Leaves are 10-30mm long begin cylindrical and bent downwards, becoming hastate with age. Flowers occur singly or in small spikes and are small with free perianth-segments 3-4mm long, and are at first membranous but become cartilaginous. 3-10mm fruit (including 2-5mm horizontal wings) are present from May to October. After seeds ripen plants yellow and seeds are distributed after stem is broken by insect action and the plant can blow in the wind as a Tumbleweed.

== Taxonomy ==
Salsola plants found in Australia were believed to belong to cosmopolitan Salsola kali Mill. (syn. Salsola sect. Kali Dum.), but revision has now placed it as a separate species endemic to Australia.

=== Potential subspecies ===
Potential multiple subspecies exist in Australia but status is undetermined at this time. S. australis subsp. Coastal (R.J.Chinnock 10246) is a dense shrub found on Australian coastsInland potential subspecies described by Chinnock include S. australis subsp. Glaucous (R.J.Chinnock 10206),S. australis subsp. Compact (R.J.Chinnock 10176), S. australis subsp. Strobilifera (R.J.Chinnock 10177), S. australis subsp. Pubescent (R.J.Chinnock 10207), and Salsola australis subsp. Lucid (R.J.Chinnock 10212)

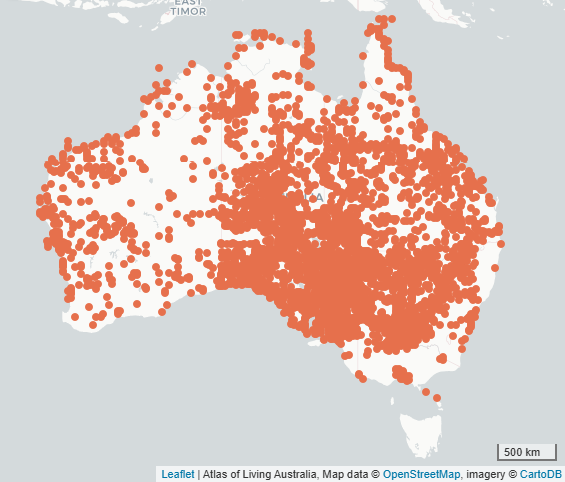
Atlas of Living Australia occurrence records of Salsola australis

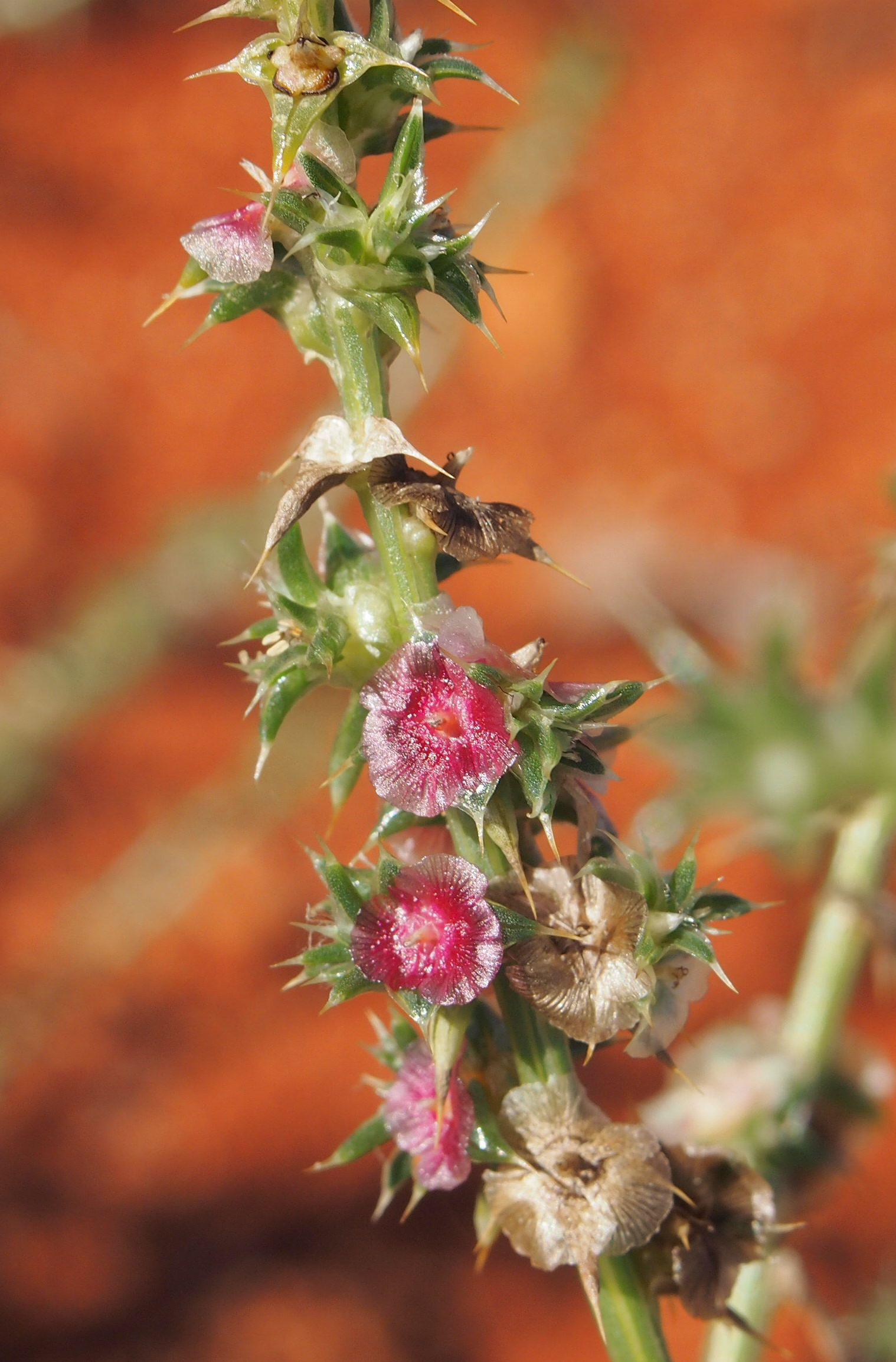
Kali australis fruit

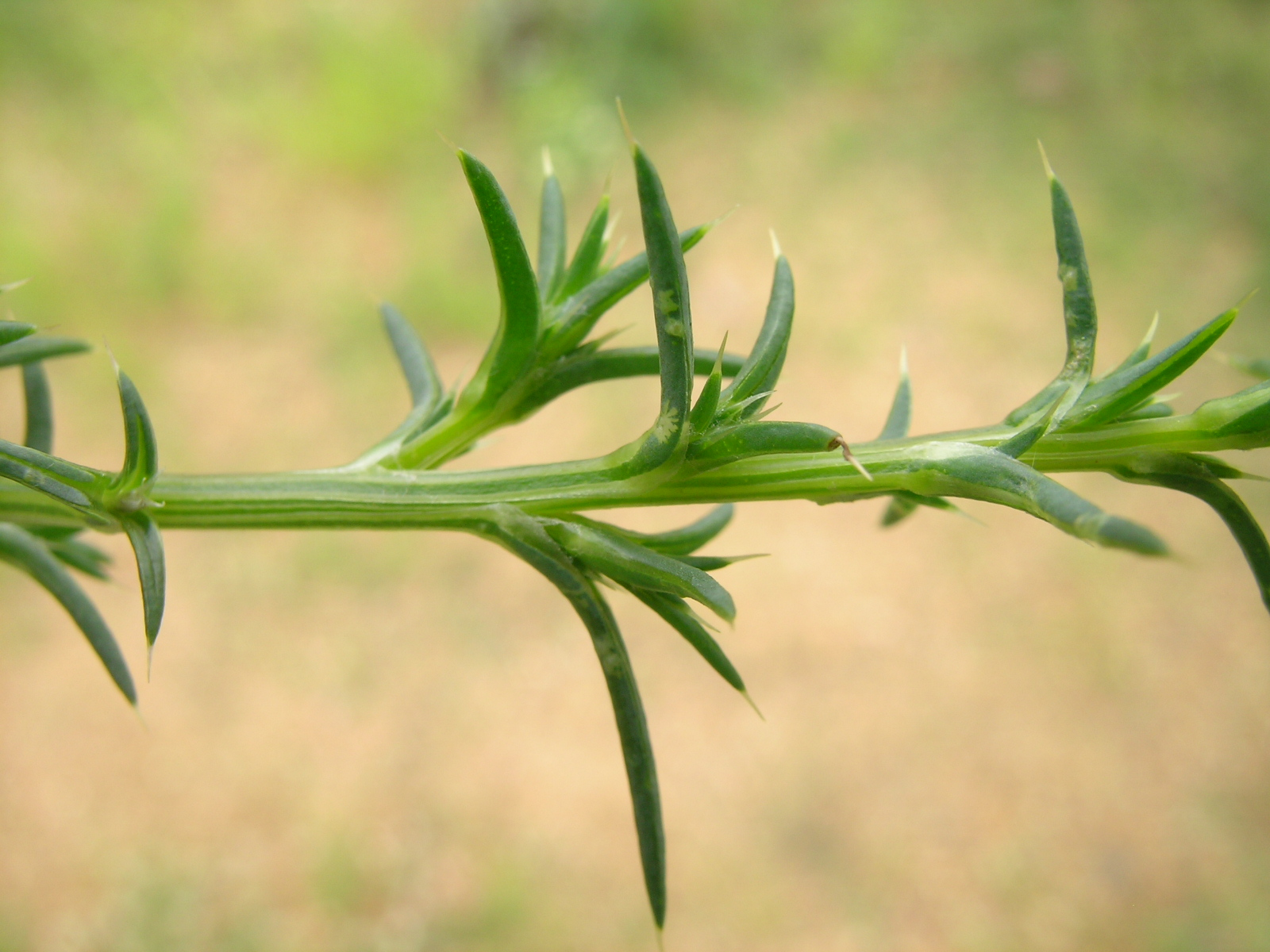
Salsola australis leaf NWP1

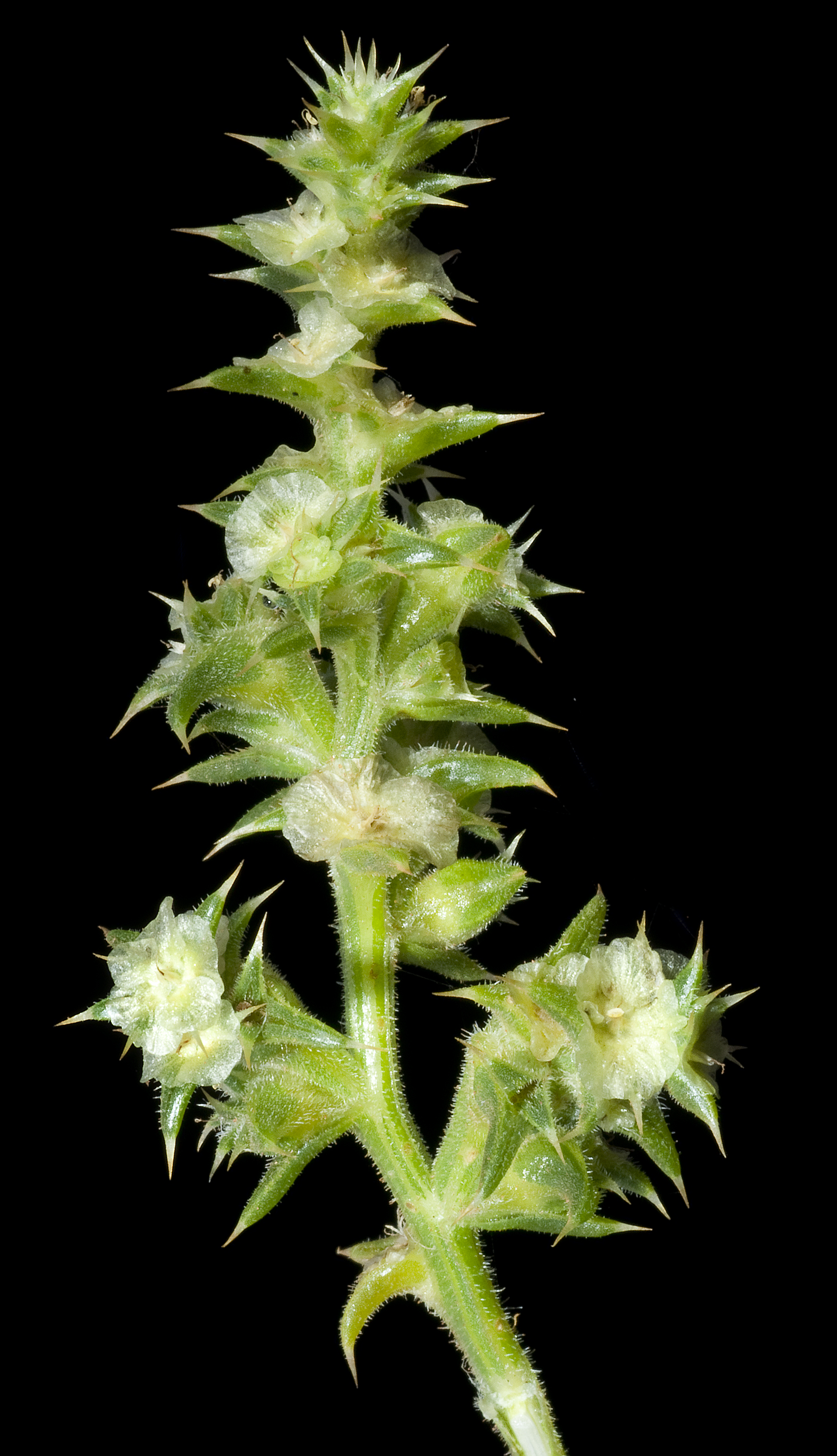
Salsola australis - Flickr - Kevin Thiele
