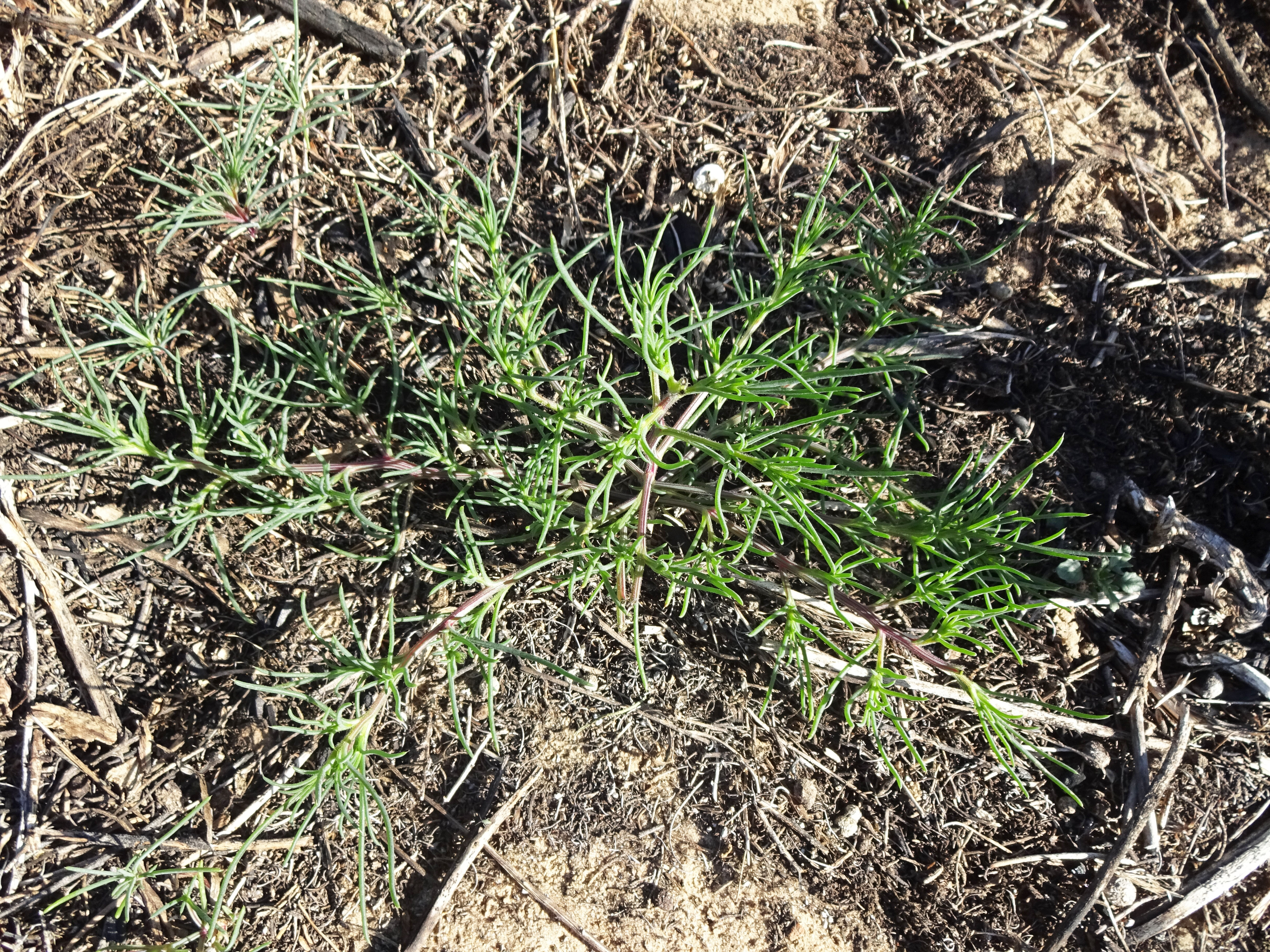

Scientific classification
- Kingdom: Plantae
- Clade: Embryophytes
- Clade: Tracheophytes
- Clade: Spermatophytes
- Clade: Angiosperms
- Clade: Eudicots
- Order: Caryophyllales
- Family: Amaranthaceae
- Genus: Salsola
- Species: S. paulsenii

Binomial name
- Salsola paulsenii Litv.

Synonyms
- Kali paulsenii (Litv.) Akhani & Roalson; Kali pellucidum (Litv.) Brullo, Giusso & Hrusa; Salsola pellucida Litv.

= Salsola paulsenii =

Species of flowering plant

Salsola paulsenii, synonym Kali paulsenii, is a species of flowering plant in the amaranth family known by the common name barbwire Russian thistle. It is native to Eurasia and it is present in the American southwest as an introduced species and sometimes a weed in sandy, disturbed habitat types. It is an annual herb forming a brambly clump of intricately branched, prostrate to erect stems growing up to a meter long. The reddish stems are lined with yellow-green, thready, fleshy, or needlelike, spine-tipped leaves a few millimeters to three centimeters long. The inflorescence is an interrupted series of flowers, with one flower per leaf axil. The flower is surrounded by a disclike array of wide, winged sepals which are whitish at the tips and pinkish at the bases.

Salsola paulsenii is named for the Danish botanist and explorer Ove Paulsen.

This plant is similar to Salsola tragus (syn. Kali tragus) and sometimes forms hybrids with it.
