= Salsola strobilifera =

Scientific classification
- Kingdom: Plantae
- Clade: Tracheophytes
- Clade: Angiosperms
- Clade: Eudicots
- Order: Caryophyllales
- Family: Amaranthaceae
- Genus: Salsola
- Species: S. strobilifera

Binomial name
- Salsola strobilifera (Benth.) Mosyakin

Synonyms
- Salsola australis var. strobilifera (Benth.) Domin; Salsola kali var. strobilifera Benth.

Species of plant

Salsola strobilifera (Benth.) Mosyakin is a species of flowering plant in the family Amaranthaceae, native to New South Wales, Australia. It was first described by George Bentham in 1870 as Salsola kali var. strobilifera. Salsola strobilifera Moq. is a synonym of Suaeda maritima.
