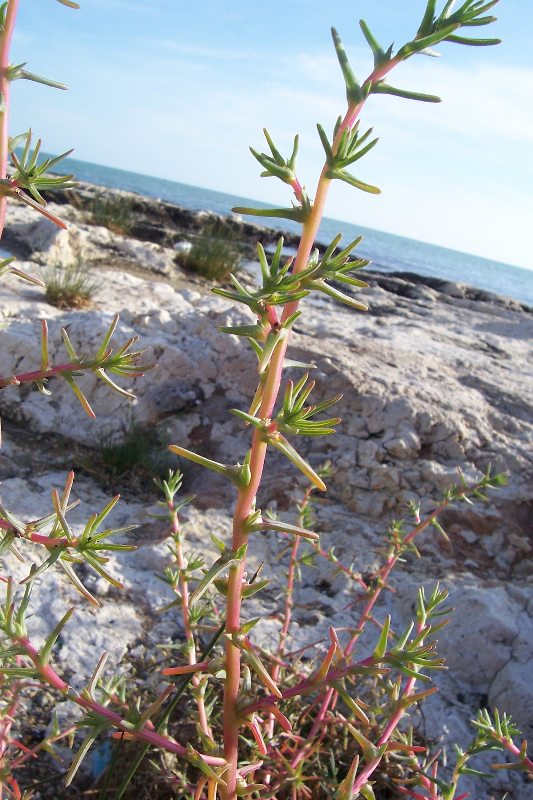

Scientific classification
- Kingdom: Plantae
- Clade: Tracheophytes
- Clade: Angiosperms
- Clade: Eudicots
- Order: Caryophyllales
- Family: Amaranthaceae
- Subfamily: Salsoloideae
- Genus: Soda
- Species: S. inermis

Binomial name
- Soda inermis Fourr., 1869

Synonyms
- Salsola soda L.

= Soda inermis =

Species of plant

Soda inermis, the opposite-leaved saltwort, oppositeleaf Russian thistle, or barilla plant, is a small (to 0.7 m tall), annual, succulent shrub that is native to the Mediterranean Basin. It is a halophyte (a salt-tolerant plant) that typically grows in coastal regions and can be irrigated with salt water. The plant was previously classified as Salsola soda, now regarded as a synonym.

The plant has great historical importance as a source of soda ash, which was extracted from the ashes of Salsola soda and other saltwort plants. Soda ash is one of the alkali substances that are crucial in glassmaking and soapmaking. The famed clarity of 16th-century cristallo glass from Murano and Venice depended upon the purity of "Levantine soda ash", and the nature of this ingredient was kept secret. Spain had an enormous 18th-century industry that produced soda ash from the saltworts (barrilla in Spanish). Soda ash is now known to be predominantly sodium carbonate. In 1807, Sir Humphry Davy isolated a metallic element from caustic soda; he named the new element "sodium" to indicate its relationship to "soda". Before "soda" was somewhat synonymous (in U.S. English) with soft drinks, the word referred to Salsola soda and other saltwort plants, and to soda ash.

While the era of farming for soda ash is long past, S. soda is still cultivated as a vegetable that enjoys considerable popularity in Greece, Italy and with gourmets around the world. In Greek it is called almyra, while in Italian its common names include barba di frate, agretti, and liscari sativa (short: lischi or lischeri). Of its culinary value, Frances Mayes has written that "Spinach is the closest taste, but while agretti has the mineral sharpness of spinach, it tastes livelier, full of the energy of spring."

== Description ==
This annual, succulent plant can grow into small shrubs up to 0.7 m tall (sometimes called subshrubs). It has fleshy green leaves with either green or red stems. The tiny flowers develop from inflorescences that grow out of the base of the leaves near the stem.

== Distribution ==
Salsola soda is native in Eurasia and North Africa. Historically, it was well known in Italy, Sicily, and Spain. In modern Europe, it is also found on the Atlantic coasts of France and Portugal and on the Black Sea coast. It has become naturalized along the Pacific coast of North America, and there is concern about its invasiveness in California's salt marshes. It is also reported to be naturalized in South America.

== Soda ash and the biology of sodium accumulation ==
The ashes obtained by the burning of S. soda can be refined to make a product called soda ash, which is one of the alkali materials essential to making soda-lime glass, soap, and many other products. The principal active ingredient is sodium carbonate, with which the term "soda ash" is now nearly synonymous. The processed ashes of S. soda contain as much as 30% sodium carbonate.

A high concentration of sodium carbonate in the ashes of S. soda occurs if the plant is grown in highly saline soils (i.e. in soils with a high concentration of sodium chloride), so that the plant's tissues contain a fairly high concentration of sodium ions. S. soda can be irrigated with sea water, which contains about 40 g/L of dissolved sodium chloride and other salts. When these sodium-rich plants are burned, the carbon dioxide that is produced presumably reacts with this sodium to form sodium carbonate.

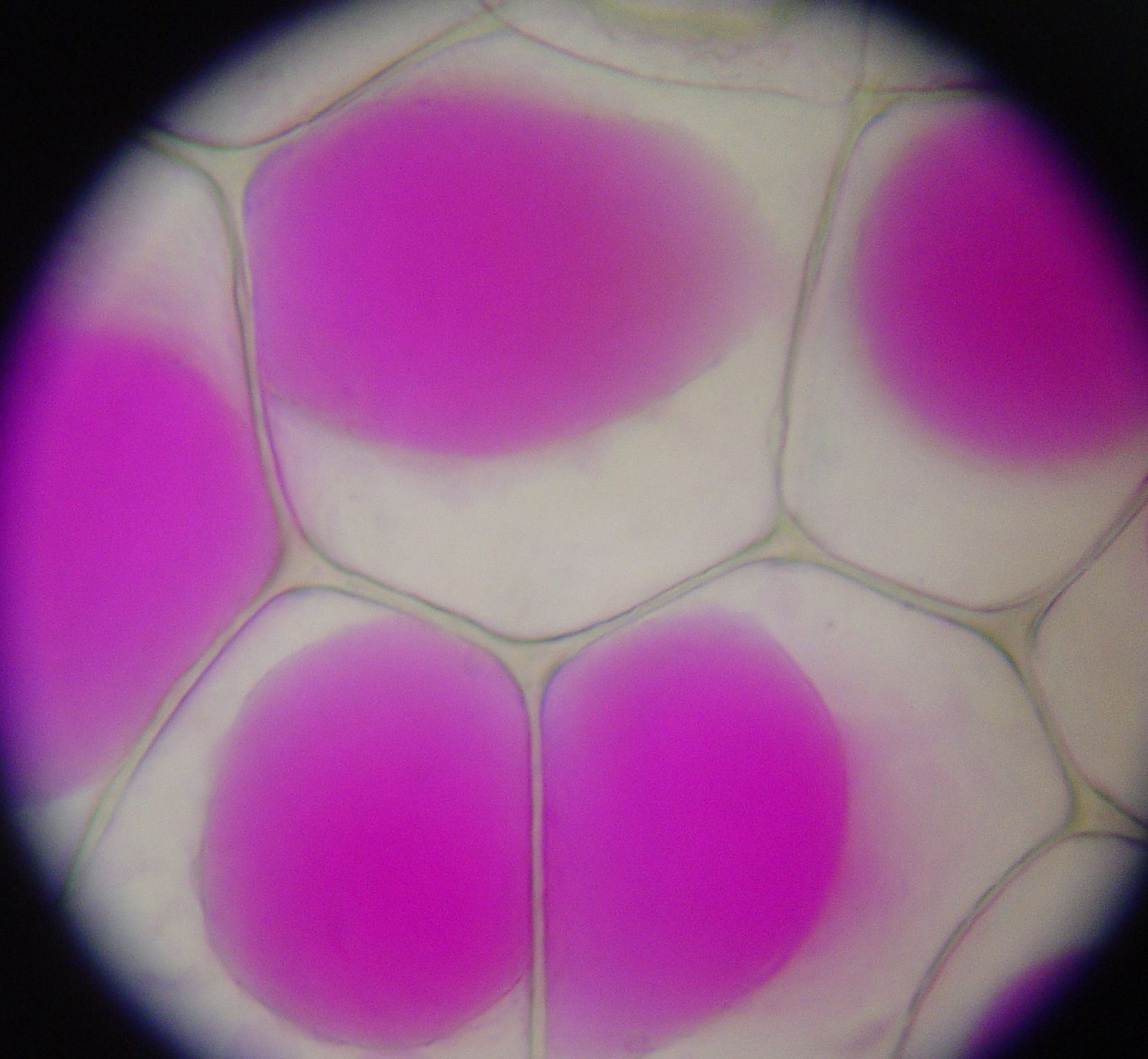
Cells of the boatlily plant Rhoeo discolor. The large pink region in each cell is a vacuole. Sodium is sequestered in vacuoles by halophyte cells.

It is surprising to find a higher concentration of sodium than of potassium in plant tissues; the former element is usually toxic, and the latter element is essential, to the metabolic processes of plants. Thus, most plants, and especially most crop plants, are "glycophytes", and suffer damage when planted in saline soils. S. soda, and the other plants that were cultivated for soda ash, are "halophytes" that tolerate much more saline soils than do glycophytes, and that can thrive with much larger densities of sodium in their tissues than can glycophytes.

The biochemical processes within the cells of halophytes are typically as sensitive to sodium as are the processes in glycophytes. Sodium ions from a plant's soil or irrigation water are toxic primarily because they interfere with biochemical processes within a plant's cells that require potassium, which is a chemically similar alkali metal element. The cell of a halophyte such as S. soda has a molecular transport mechanism that sequesters sodium ions into a compartment within the plant cell called a "vacuole". The vacuole of a plant cell can occupy 80% of the cell's volume; most of a halophyte plant cell's sodium can be sequestered in the vacuole, leaving the rest of the cell with a tolerable ratio of sodium to potassium ions.

In addition to S. soda, soda ash has also been produced from the ashes of S. kali (another saltwort plant), of glasswort plants, and of kelp, a type of seaweed. The sodium carbonate, which is water-soluble, is "lixiviated" from the ashes (extracted with water), and the resulting solution is boiled dry to obtain the finished soda ash product. A very similar process is used to obtain potash (mainly potassium carbonate) from the ashes of hardwood trees. Because halophytes must also have potassium ions in their tissues, even the best soda ash derived from them also contains some potash (potassium carbonate), as was known by the 19th century.

Plants were a very important source of soda ash until the early 19th century. In the 18th century, Spain had an enormous industry producing barilla (one type of plant-derived soda ash) from saltwort plants. Similarly, Scotland had a large 18th-century industry producing soda ash from kelp; this industry was so lucrative that it led to overpopulation in the Western Isles of Scotland, and one estimate is that 100,000 people were occupied with "kelping" during the summer months. The commercialization of the Leblanc process for synthesizing sodium carbonate (from salt, limestone, and sulfuric acid) brought an end to the era of farming for soda ash in the first half of the 19th century.

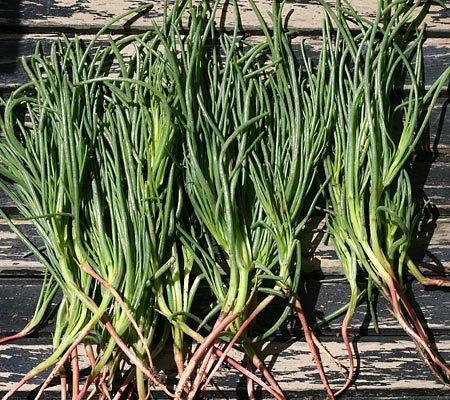
Freshly harvested agretti (S. soda)

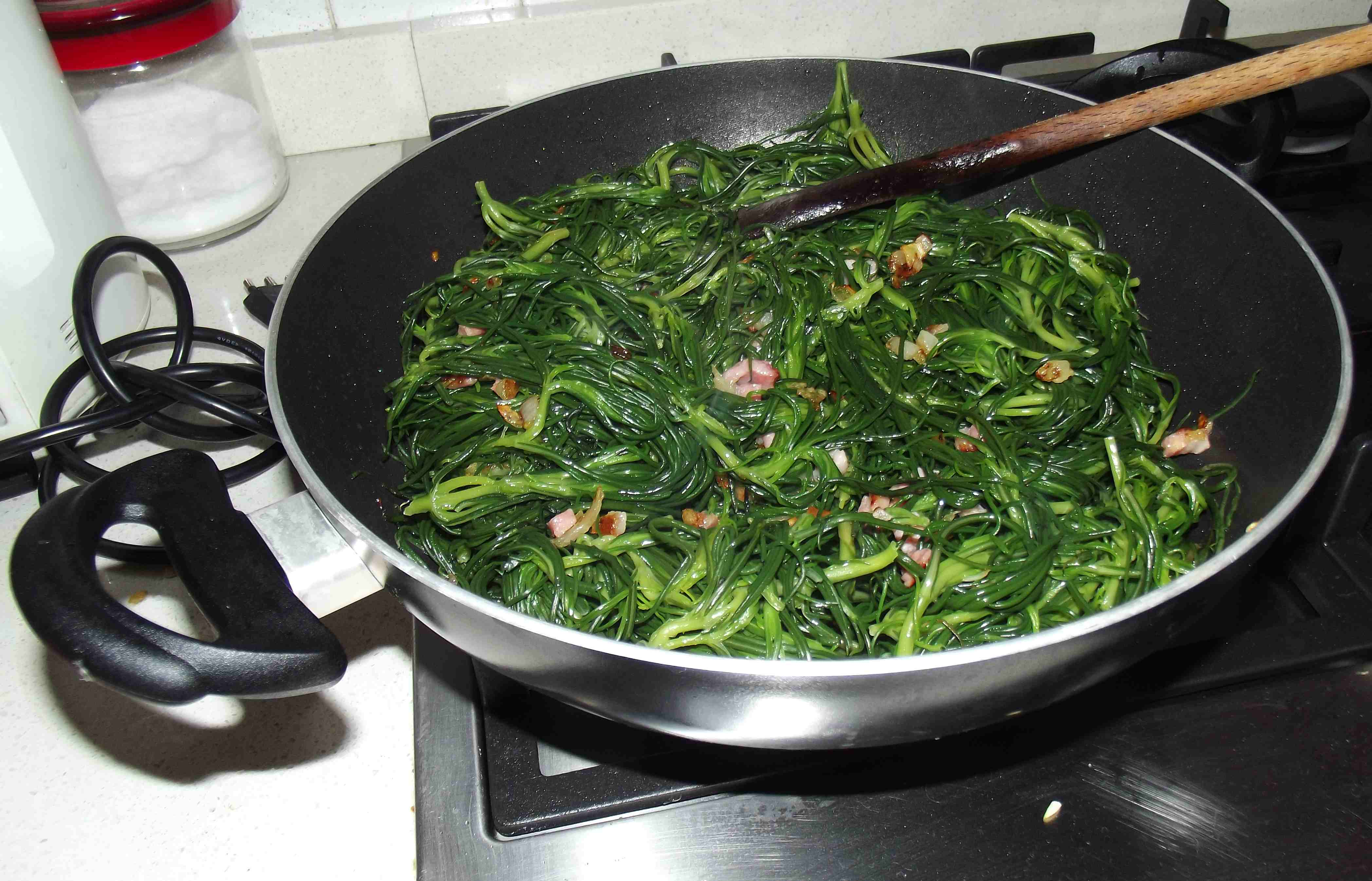
Agretti cooked with onions and bacon

== Cultivation and culinary uses ==
The Italian name agretti is commonly used in English to refer to the edible leaves of S. soda; barba di frate (or friar's beard) is the most common of the Italian names. This plant is not a summer green and should be started early indoors or in autumn. The seed is notorious for poor germination at about 30 to 40% standard, much like rosemary. Though the plant is often grown in saltwater-irrigated land in the Mediterranean Basin, it will grow without salt water. S. soda is harvested in bunches when small, or cropped regularly to encourage new growth when mature. It is most commonly boiled and eaten as a leafy vegetable; the recommendation is to cook it in boiling water until the leaves soften, and to serve while some bite (crunch) remains (much like samphire). It can also be eaten raw; it is said to taste "grassy and slightly salty with a pleasant, crunchy texture".

Salsola soda is sometimes confused with a plant known in Japan as okahijiki (land seaweed), which is actually the species S. komarovii. The harvested leaves of the two species have a similar appearance.

== Phytoremediation ==
Salsola soda has also been studied as a bioremediation "biodesalinating companion plant" for crops such as tomatoes and peppers when they are grown in saline soils. The Salsola soda extracts enough sodium from the soil to improve the growth of the crop plant, and better crop yields result despite the competition of the two plants for the remaining minerals from the soil.

== See also ==
- Phytoremediation plants
- Hyperaccumulators table – 3
