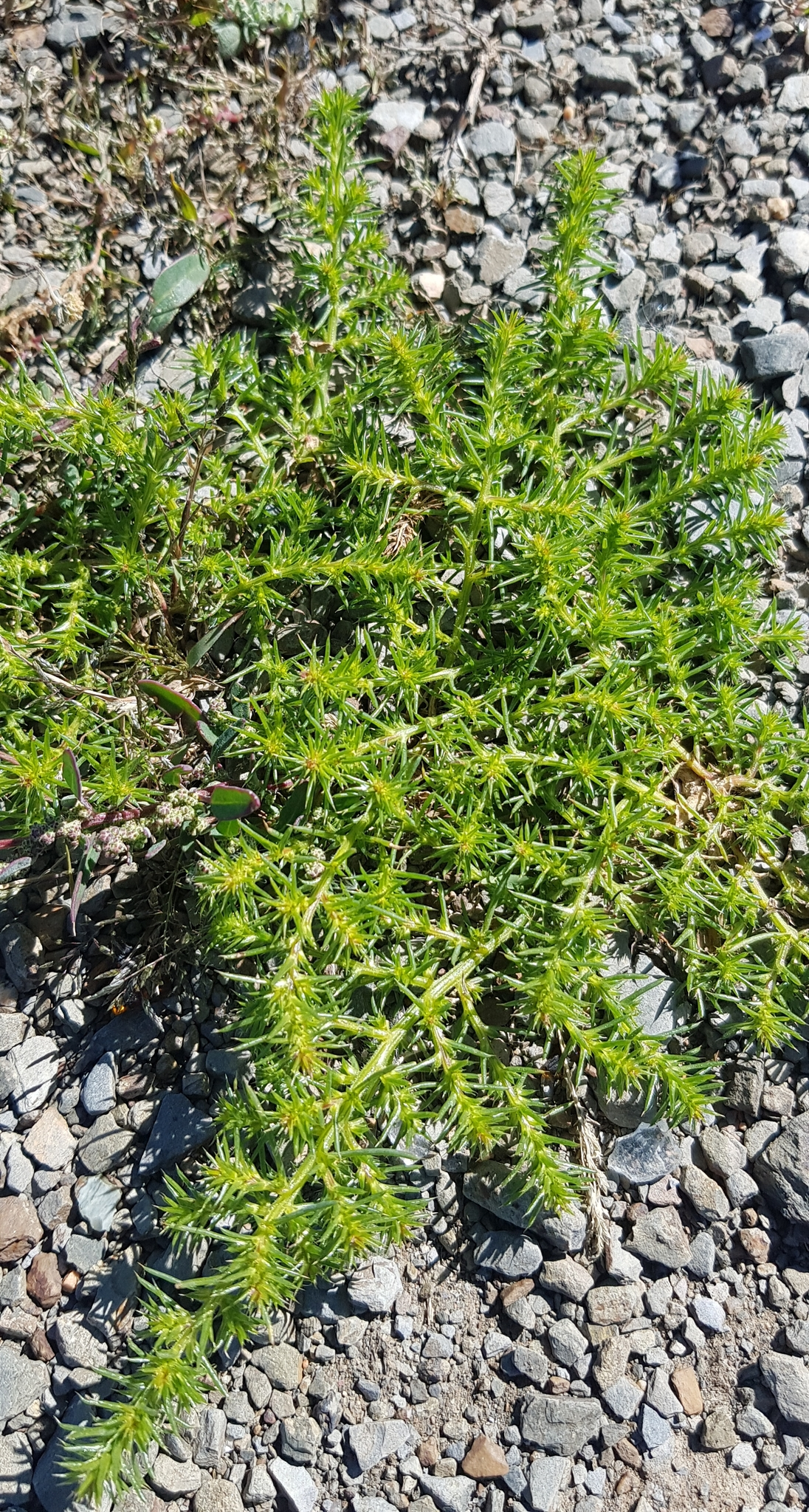

Scientific classification
- Kingdom: Plantae
- Clade: Tracheophytes
- Clade: Angiosperms
- Clade: Eudicots
- Order: Caryophyllales
- Family: Amaranthaceae
- Genus: Salsola
- Species: S. collina

Binomial name
- Salsola collina Pall.

= Salsola collina =

Species of tumbleweed

Salsola collina, commonly known as the slender Russian thistle, tumbleweed, or Russian thistle, is a species of flowering plant in the genus Salsola.

== Description ==
Salsola Collina is a round, bush-like annual forb that grows from 1 to 3.5 feet (30 to 107 cm) high. While soft when young, as they mature the plants become woody. They are called Tumbleweeds due to their habit of breaking off when mature and tumbling when the wind blows. That behaviour helps spread its seeds, but can also be a hazard when blowing across roadways or accumulating along fence lines, hedges, or other obstructions.

== Range ==
Salsola collina is native from Eastern Europe to Eastern Asia. It was introduced to the United States from Russia.

== Habitat ==
Prefers sandy, dry soils such as found on plains, roadsides, cultivated fields, disturbed areas. It grows best in full sun and cannot grow in the shade.

== Ecology ==
Salsola collina can be invasive and threaten native plants systems.
