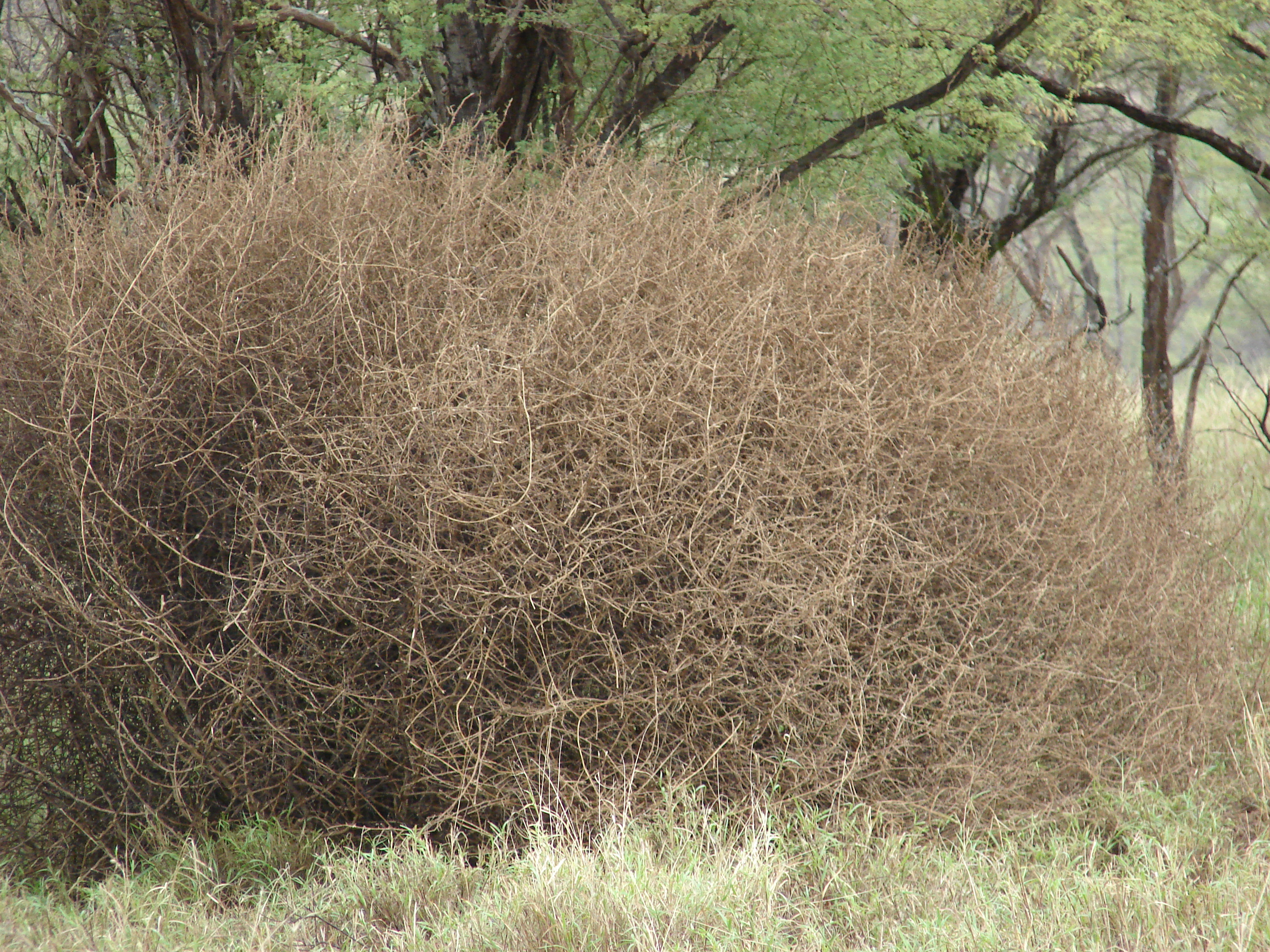
- S. tragus in tumbleweed form

Scientific classification
- Kingdom: Plantae
- Clade: Embryophytes
- Clade: Tracheophytes
- Clade: Spermatophytes
- Clade: Angiosperms
- Clade: Eudicots
- Order: Caryophyllales
- Family: Amaranthaceae
- Genus: Salsola
- Species: S. tragus

Binomial name
- Salsola tragus L.

Synonyms
- Kali tragus (L.) Scop.; Salsola kali var. brevimarginata W.D.J.Koch; Salsola kali var. glabra Ten.; Salsola kali L. subsp. tragus DC.; Salsola ruthenica var. tragus (L.) Morariu; many heterotypic synonyms

= Salsola tragus =

Species of flowering plant

Salsola tragus, often known by its synonym Kali tragus, is a species of flowering plant in the family Amaranthaceae. It is known by various common names such as prickly Russian thistle, windwitch, or common saltwort. It is widely known simply as tumbleweed because, in many regions of the United States, it is the most common and most conspicuous plant species that produces tumbleweeds. Informally, it may be known as Kali or Salsola: the latter being its restored genus, containing 54 other species, into which the obsolete genus Kali has been subsumed.

For a brief period during its youth, it may be grazed, but afterward it becomes too spiny and woody to be edible for most wildlife and livestock (unless processed first). Mature specimens are often more than a meter in diameter. As its fruits mature, the diaspore of the plant dies, dries, hardens, and detaches from its root. This detached anatomical part of Salsola tragus is colloquially called "tumbleweed" (although there are many other plant species that also produce tumbleweeds). Once mature, dry, and detached from the plant, this tumbleweed will tumble (i.e., roll) due to the force of the wind. As this dead structure tumbles in the wind, it gradually degrades and falls apart, thereby spreading possibly as many as 200,000 seeds. If it comes to rest in a wet area, it can germinate rapidly, even with very little moisture. It has a high salinity tolerance. It can successfully compete with many native plants in certain environments, such as along seashores and especially in grasslands, deserts, or semiarid regions. Consequently, it now occupies a wide variety of habitats.

Native to Eurasia, Salsola tragus has proven to be highly invasive as an introduced species and rapidly became a common ruderal weed of disturbed habitats throughout the world. The tumbleweed's tumbling is known to damage non-native plants and environments, and its highly flammable nature also sometimes helps wildfires spread, especially during windy conditions. An ignited tumbleweed may spread a fire across firebreaks and may even ignite buildings or structures that it stops against.

== Taxonomy ==
Linnaeus originally described the species as Salsola tragus; it is native to Eurasia, but in the 1870s, it appeared in South Dakota when flaxseed from Russia turned out to be contaminated with Salsola seeds. Although it is the best-known of this group of weeds and was once thought to be a single, well-defined species, it is now known to include more than one species and some hybrids. This has led to taxonomic confusion in dealing with species in the genera Salsola and Kali in America. Recent studies show that the population once assigned to Salsola tragus comprises three or more morphologically similar species that differ in flower size and shape. The group was widely assigned to the family Chenopodiaceae, but the Chenopodiaceae – including the genera Kali and Salsola – have since been included in the Amaranthaceae. They now are allocated to the Salsoloideae, a subfamily of the Amaranthaceae.

== Description ==
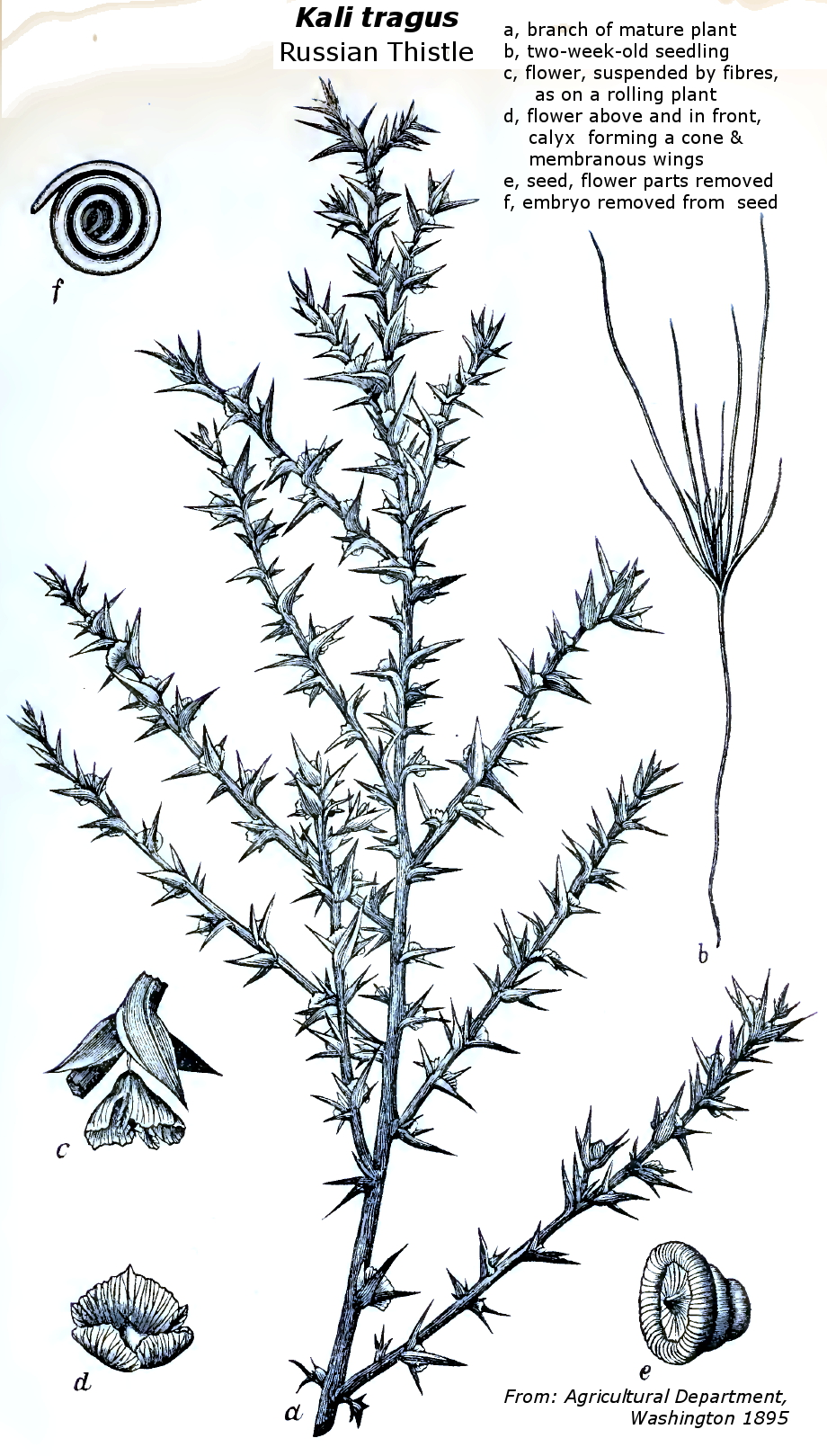
Salsola tragus, the Russian thistle

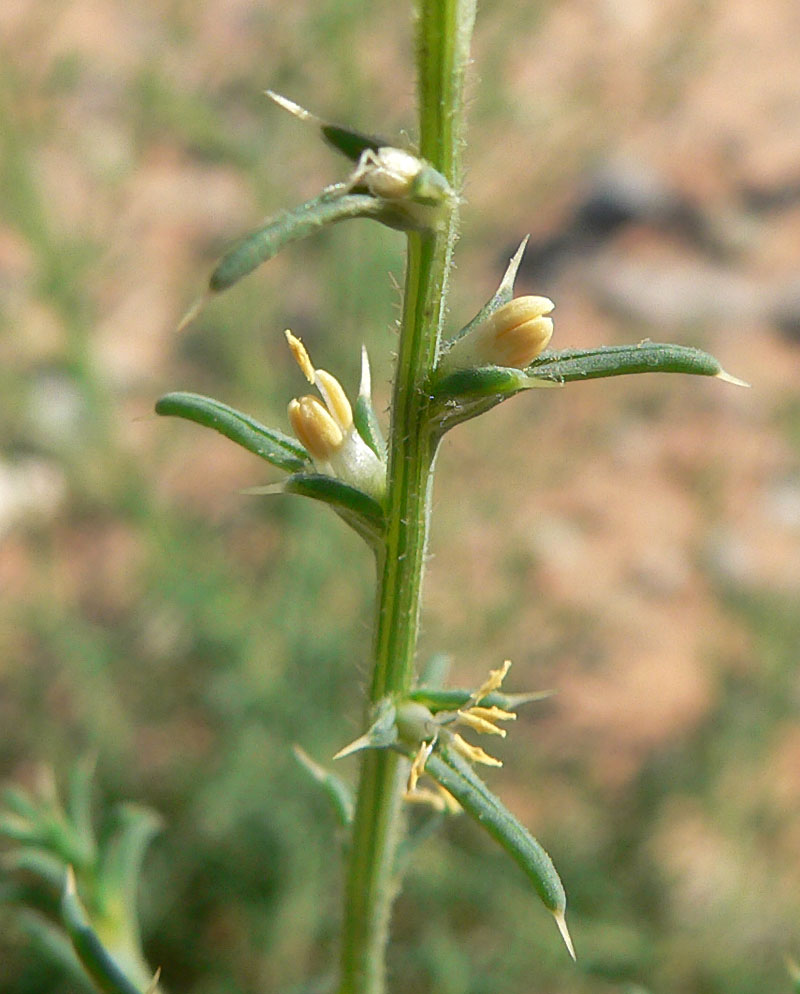
Leaves of a mature plant coming into flower, each leaf with one flower and two bracts in its axil

Salsola tragus is an annual forb. In habit, the young plant is erect, but it grows into a rounded clump of branched, tangled stems, each one up to about a metre long. Depending on the plant's genetics and condition, the leaves and stems may be green, red, or striped, and they may be hairless or pubescent. The leaves are tipped with spines that in most varieties are so sharp that the plants are best handled with gloves and other suitably protective clothing, though some genetic variants have only a hair at the tip. On the young plant, leaves may be more than 5 cm long, succulent and more or less cylindrical; these juvenile leaves are deciduous and drop off as the plant matures. The leaves of the mature plant are persistent, leathery, broader and shorter than the young leaves (seldom more than 1 cm in length), rigid and spine-tipped. They remain on the stem till the plant dies at the end of the season. In the axil of the mature leaf, there are two leaf-like bracts with a flower between them. The flower lacks petals but is surrounded by a disk of wide, winged sepals, whitish to pink.

== Ecology ==
=== Reproduction and dispersal ===
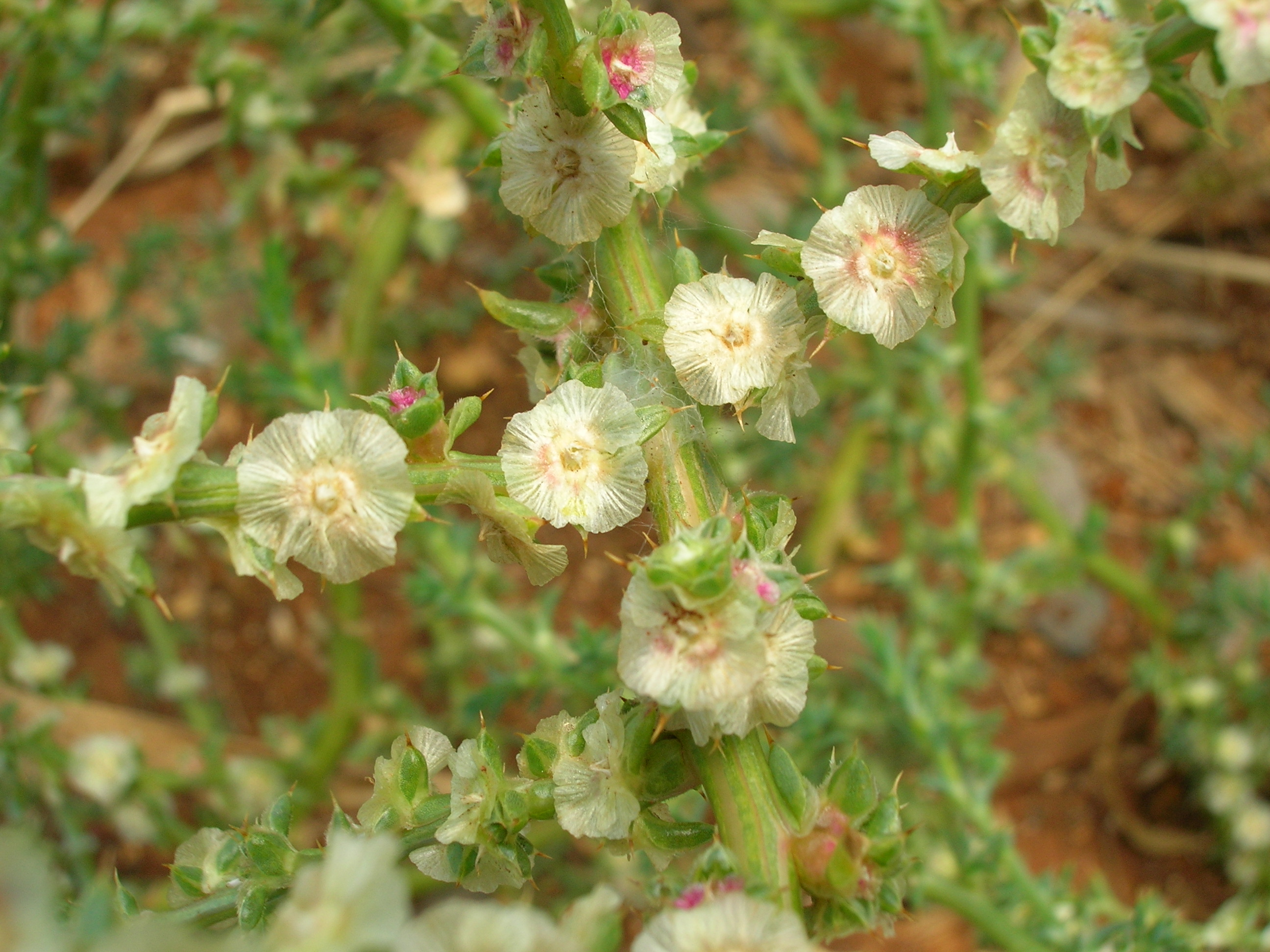
Largely ripe fruit of Salsola tragus.

Salsola tragus rolling in the wind in Hockenheim, Germany (November 2015).

The plant becomes woody as the fruits develop. As they ripen, the plant begins to die, dry out, and become brittle. In that state, the base of the stem breaks off easily, particularly in high winds. The plant then rolls readily before the wind and disperses its seeds as a tumbleweed.

A large specimen of Salsola tragus may produce some 200,000 seeds.

=== Invasive potential ===
Salsola tragus has proven to be highly invasive as an introduced species and rapidly became a common ruderal weed of disturbed habitats in many regions of North America, particularly in the Midwest. The species has also become naturalized in various regions of Central and South America and in parts of Southern Africa and Australia. It now occupies a wide variety of habitat types in those regions. It often is the first or even the only colonizer in conditions where no local species can compete successfully. Because it prefers sand and its tolerance of salinity, it commonly grows along sea beaches as well as in disturbed grassland and desert communities, especially in semiarid regions.

== Edibility ==
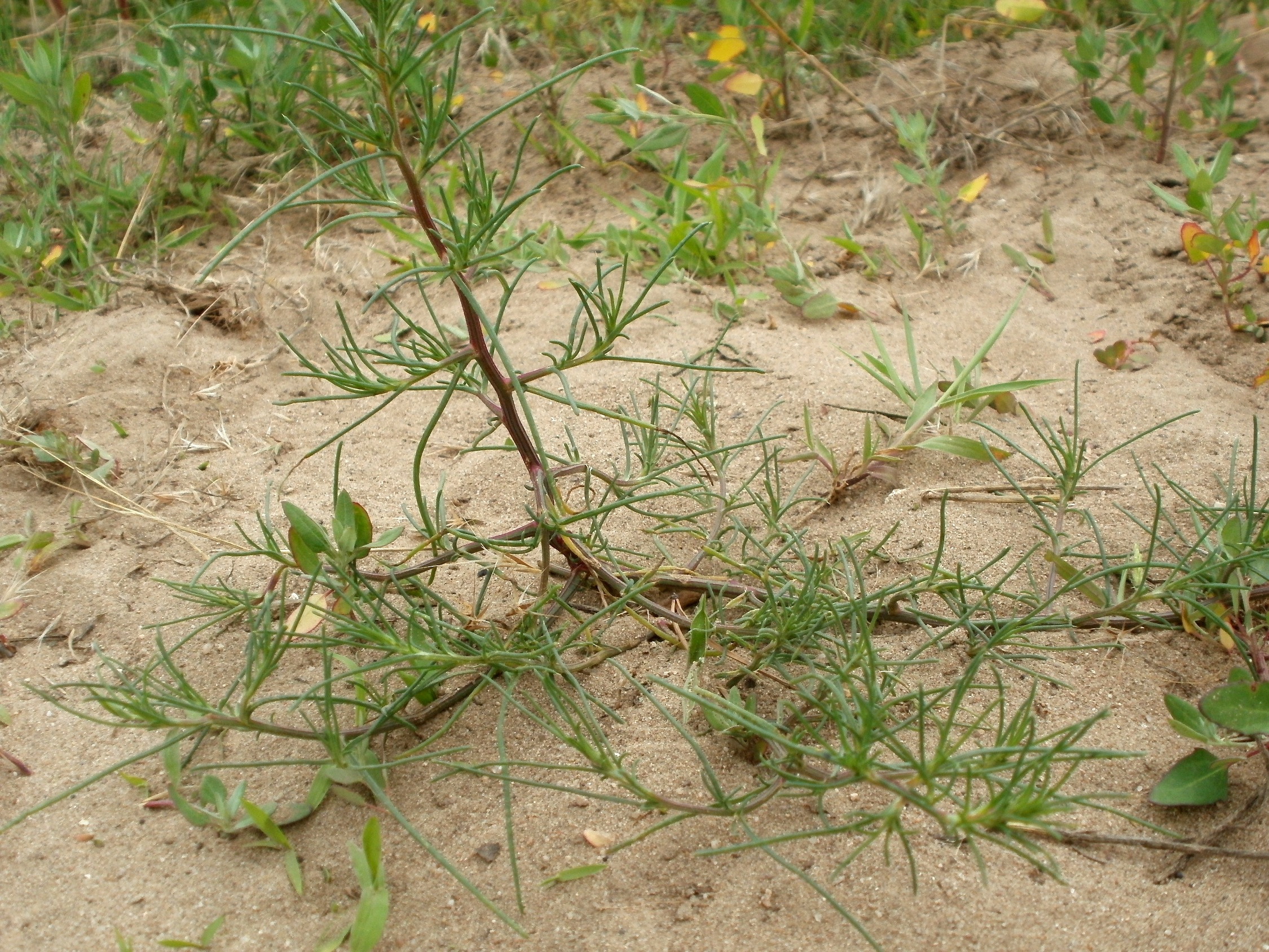
Immature specimen of Salsola tragus, with juvenile foliage. Young plants are edible.

The plant is edible when young, and its shoots can be harvested and eaten. As the plant matures, it becomes too woody, bitter, and spiny to be considered edible. The young shoots can be eaten raw in salads, and are reported to be even more flavorful when cooked as a pot herb. Young plants are also reported as good fodder for livestock. Some varieties of Russian thistle can contain above-average levels of oxalic acid, particularly in older plants, and people who are sensitive to oxalic acid should avoid the genus, as it is a severe allergen for some. Oxalates in certain vegetables contribute to gout and are a causative agent in certain types of kidney and bladder stones; therefore, K. tragus is not recommended for people with a history of such conditions or with diabetic kidney disease. People who have adverse reactions to eating spinach, which also can have high levels of oxalates, should avoid consumption of Russian thistle.

== Ecology and agricultural management ==
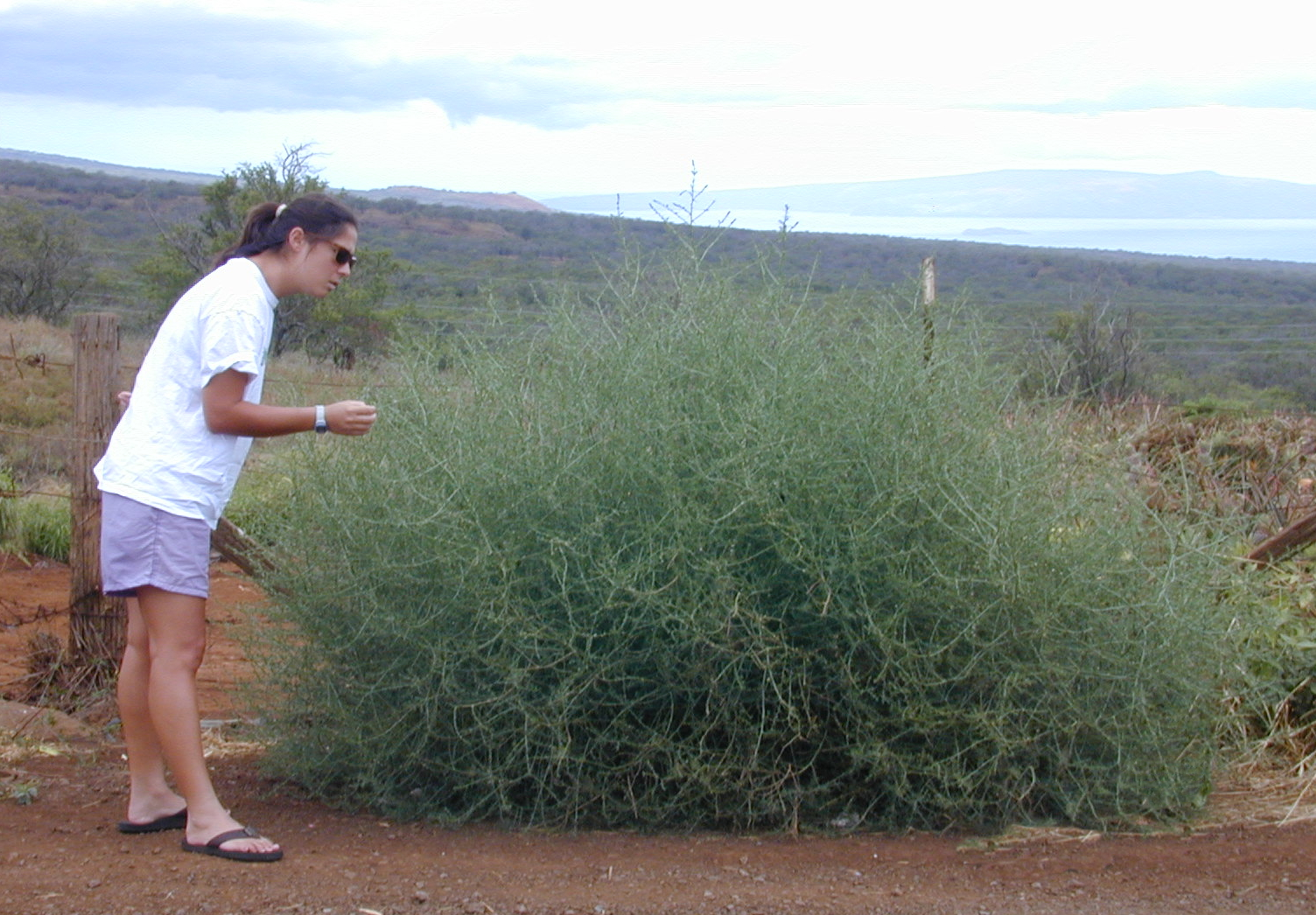
Salsola tragus is an unusually large species of tumbleweed. This specimen – although still green – is above average, but not exceptional. (August 2002)

Salsola tragus is a ruderal annual forb. It germinates rapidly even with very little moisture in arid conditions. When young, it may be grazed freely, but that phase lasts for only a brief period, and generally at a time when other forage is relatively plentiful. After this, it becomes a weed in most contexts. One reason is that as they mature, most varieties become too spiny and woody for most stock to browse. Moreover, older foliage develops higher levels of oxalates, bitter tannins, and alkaloids, making it unpalatable. As its fruits mature, the plant dies, dries, and becomes hard and brittle. In this state, it is likely to detach from its root and become a tumbleweed. As tumbleweeds go, it is very large, often a metre or more in diameter, spiny, largely inedible to most livestock if unprocessed, and a fire hazard. However, in regions where there is plentiful winter rain, the moisture softens both the twigs and the spines, after which hardy breeds of livestock and some wildlife species once again will eat it.

Salsola tragus has acquired a bad reputation for its spininess, its woodiness in maturity, and its general ecological competitiveness, augmented by its tumbleweed nature, which enables it to spread rapidly across open ground. Prince Gallitzin reported that on the journey out of his native Russia, he passed through southwest Siberia and found the Imperial government's irrigation project abandoned and the farms deserted, on account of K. tragus. Furthermore, Oryol Oblast and Kyiv Oblast were also especially infested. During the past century or more, the majority of the publications that dealt with the topic have discussed its pernicious nature, the increasing threats that the species poses, and how to combat its invasiveness; they largely have ignored its other attributes.

However, even early publications conceded that the plant is of value as forage in severely arid conditions where few other forage species are viable. As for its harmful competitiveness, most authors emphasised its invasiveness, though some did mention its value in regenerating overgrazed or otherwise abused land.

Apart from its value to domestic cattle and sheep in some regions, Salsola tragus provides food and shelter for several wildlife species. Its nutritional value is high; it is rich in various minerals, Vitamin A, and phosphorus. It is a minor forage component for bison, mule deer, and wapiti. Pronghorn eat it with reluctance in drought conditions, but feed on it avidly under rainy conditions, especially in wet years. Prairie dogs consume it as a major food wherever they encounter it. Seed-eating birds and small mammals, such as rodents, feed on seeds.

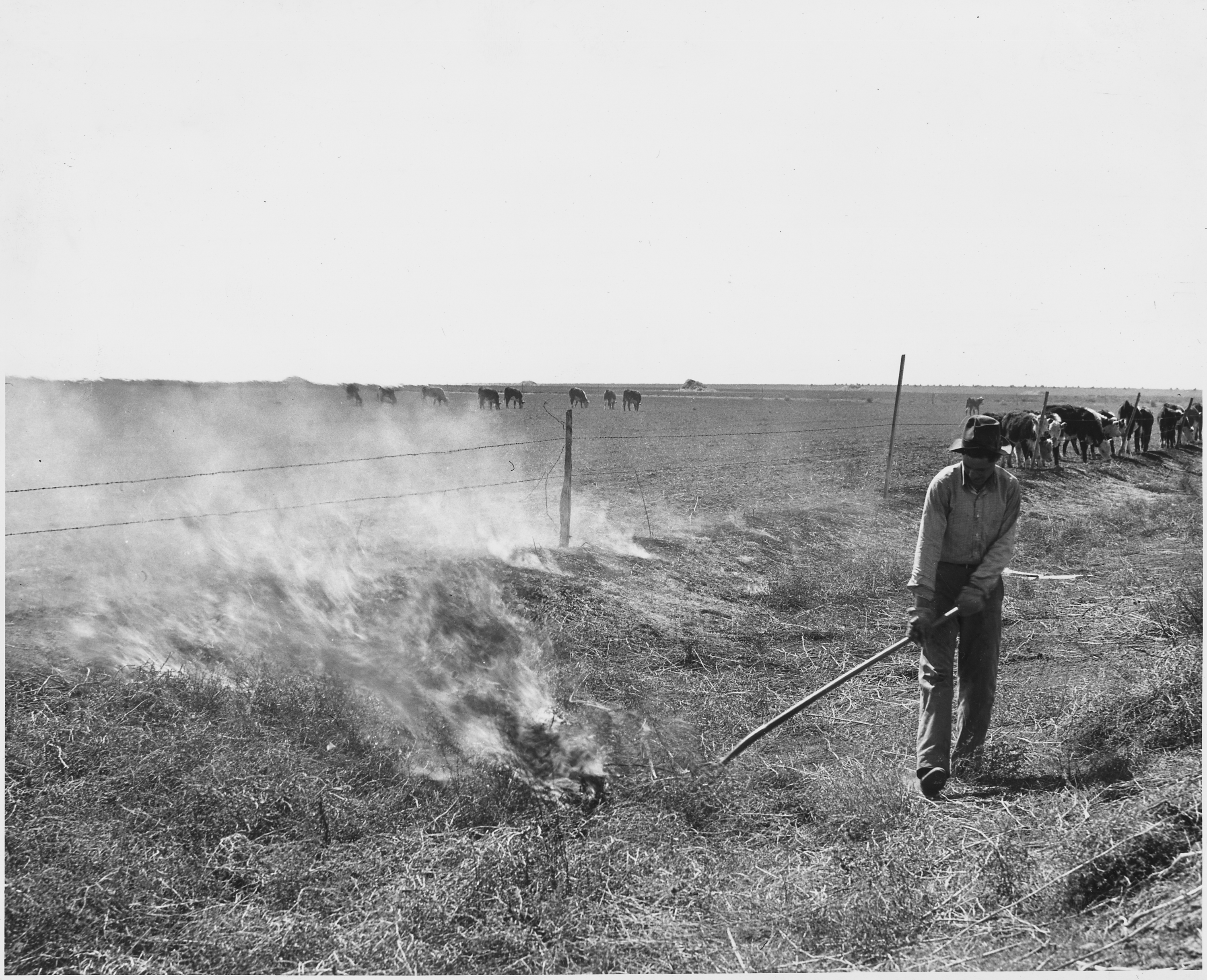
Farmer in Haskell County, Kansas burning tumbleweeds in a roadside ditch (April 1941).

Salsola tragus offers shelter for some wildlife. Medium-sized deer species make some use of it, but it is mainly of value to small mammals and bird species that normally live close to the ground and shelter under bushes.

Some livestock species, such as camels and some breeds of stock that are adapted to semi-desert conditions, will brave the spines when forage becomes scarce. Many goats and some breeds of sheep such as karakul browse the bushes. The plant, like many members of the Amaranthaceae, is rich in high-quality proteins with a good balance of essential amino acids, the seed even more so.

Oxalic acid occurs in a wide range of plants, including S. tragus, as an adaptation to alkaline, relatively drier soils rich in calcite, gypsum, alumina, and/or other metal ions. Oxalic acid forms highly insoluble salts with calcium, aluminum, chromium, copper, lead, and many other transition metals. Oxalic acid is produced in specialized parenchyma cells called idioblasts. There it binds with excess calcium from plant tissue, forming needle-like crystals of calcium oxalate monohydrate inside such cells, called raphides. Calcium, along with other metal ions, is sequestered in idioblast cells, reducing its impact on the rest of the plant's tissues. Rhaphides also serve as a deterrent against insect predators, as the sharp crystals injure an insect's digestive tract.

Salsola tragus and many related species, including some that are widely regarded as invasive weeds in other countries, are valued in their regions of origin. They are adapted to inhospitable environments that do not support many other forage species. In Uzbekistan, for example, stems, fruits, and leaves are nutritious year-round camel feed; sheep and goats prefer it in summer, but also to some extent in autumn and winter. The fruits are important for fattening camels, goats, and karakul sheep; the fruit may partially substitute for concentrates, especially in autumn and winter. In those regions, annual Salsola species are known as "solyanki"; they are important as drought- and salt-tolerant forage and form a dominant group in the flora and vegetation of the most challenging environments. Some are useful for stabilising shifting sands and for the rehabilitation of degraded rangelands, such as the saline soils of the red desert of Kyzyl Kum. Some of the species also invade ruderal sites or occur as weeds in cultivated fields.

Although Salsola has not yet received much recognition in contemporary first-world livestock nutrition, this might reflect short memories rather than a lack of evidence for its merits; during the Dust Bowl era, it was credited with rescuing beef cattle husbandry in North America. The usual hay crops had failed, and when all other sources failed, farmers fed their cattle on tumbleweed.

=== Salsola management and soil rehabilitation ===
Despite the reigning conception that its presence is harmful, Salsola tragus is of particular value in rehabilitating certain classes of disturbed land. Often its presence is beneficial, especially when the original topsoil is still present; the species happens not to be host to any mycorrhizal fungi, whereas many or most common plants in fact are so adapted. As a result, when mycorrhizae surviving in the topsoil invade Salsola roots, they tend to kill the tissue, commonly stunting or even killing the plant. When the plant is dead, and the mycorrhizae have consumed what they can of its remains, they spread out and infect more plants, beneficially to most desirable grasses and forbs, but to the disadvantage of most of the Salsola that had been occupying the soil. They only remain to enrich, mulch, and aerate it. This promotes reinvasion of the soil by other plants adapted to forming advantageous symbiotic associations with mycorrhizae. Above the ground, any dead Salsola plants that remain standing provide shade that favours other plants' seedlings; the plants themselves, on the other hand, are highly intolerant of shade, being very much adapted to open, barren soil. This apparently complex process tends to repopulate the soil more effectively and faster than killing the Salsola with herbicides and waiting for apparently more desirable plants to make good on the original damage to the soil.

In disturbed sites with no topsoil and therefore few or no mycorrhizae, the Salsola population may remain dominant for over a decade. To speed the recovery, it is better to add rich topsoil with plenty of organic material and mycorrhizae than to attack the Salsola population. However, it is important not to regard the ecological interrelationships too simplistically; in some cases, the presence of the healthy weed plants on a harsh site without mycorrhizae actually seems to facilitate the succession of grass better than where a mycorrhizal inoculum had reduced the population of the Salsola. The assumed competitive effect of the Salsola should be assessed and monitored in each case. Furthermore, of course, where degraded soil is effectively barren, Salsola is better as a pioneer population than simply leaving the soil completely barren. Salsola grows best on sandy or at least loose-surfaced soil, so it might pay better to rake the soil to encourage plant growth for a few years until its presence has mitigated the conditions.

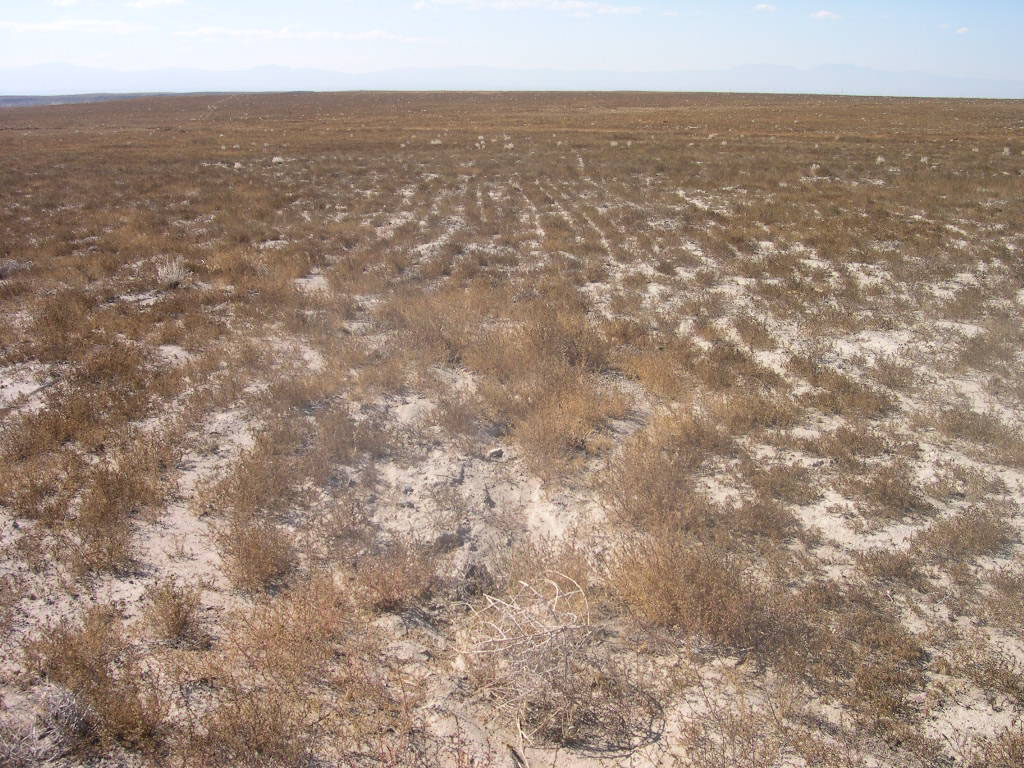
A counterproductive attempt at rangeland restoration in Idaho. After a wildfire, only Salsola tragus grew in the arid, saline clay soil, providing minimal forage for livestock and wildlife.

Another factor to bear in mind in dealing with Salsola is grazing or, more particularly, overgrazing. In regions where competitive vegetation is present together with the Salsola, overgrazing may favour the weed, while managing the grazing intensity to favour the desired plants may be the most economical, and in the long term, the most effective way of dealing with its overgrowth. A good example was in controlling troublesome Salsola on Bighorn Sheep Winter Ranges in Jasper National Park by proper management of grazing intensity.

=== Salsola and phytoremediation ===
A special class of soil mitigation is phytoremediation, in which the removal and accumulation of toxic elements from soils by suitable management of plant growth is a major component. Because such soil situations as mine dumps tend to be extreme examples of disturbed sites, and often are of fine texture, Salsola species show promise for certain classes of such work. Simply by growing there in high density, they can play a valuable role in phytostabilization by reducing wind erosion and similar processes that promote the spread of pollution. The dry tumbleweed material has also been used as mulch on replanted coal mine spoils in Arizona.

However, these plants also show promise as hyperaccumulators for phytoremediation by phytoextraction, the absorption of certain classes of toxic or at least undesirable chemicals from the soil. Commonly these are ions of heavy metals, such as cadmium (Cd(II)), chromium (both Cr(III) and Cr(VI)), lead (Pb(II)), arsenic (both As(III) and As(V)), copper (Cu(II)), nickel (Ni(II)), and zinc (Zn(II)). Such processes have been studied in Salsola for all of those ions, and others such as iron and cobalt. Salsola proved to be an active absorber of all those ions, plus some others, and it may well be a hyperaccumulator of both copper and cadmium. It certainly accumulated lead and arsenic very actively, and also chromium in the most toxic hexavalent form.

It is not yet clear that Salsola would be a useful species for commercial phytoextraction, either for phytoremediation or for phytomining. Still, there are genetic variables that could, in principle, be selected for. For instance, the ions the plant species absorb are variously bound or chelated by organic acid groups such as oxalate, or by thiol groups, among others. Some, such as arsenate, pass through phosphate metabolic processes before being bound by sulfur groups.

However, a plant that has absorbed some of the levels of toxic substances (e.g., arsenic, lead, or cadmium) that the Salsola species can accumulate probably would not be suitable for food or fodder. Thus, phytoextraction sites would have to be protected from livestock.

== Prospects for genetic improvement ==
Such considerations have led some workers to recommend that the plant be actively exploited for its very attractive merits. Frustratingly, however, the plant in the wild is highly variable; apart from its intrinsic genetic variability, invasive populations have hybridised extensively with other species of Salsola that were apparently imported at the same time. To some extent, the genus hybridises in its countries of origin as well. Apart from such sources of variability, there are considerable variations in ploidy. The unpredictability of the merits of wild strains may frustrate farmers who have tried the species and found that seeds from wild plants do not produce Salsola crops that meet their expectations, leading them to abandon their attempts.

However, despite the associated difficulties, the plants' genetic variability does imply opportunities for genetic improvement. The presence of tetraploids and hexaploids improves the prospects for new variants to be established in the population. The species, along with its hybrids and variants, has attracted attention as a valuable prospect for selective breeding for various agricultural purposes. The most desirable and the most undesirable genetically determined attributes have turned out to assort independently, which is a necessary condition for efficient selection of independent characters, so that, for example, one can select breeding stock with desirable attributes, without being unable to select for the absence of undesirable attributes. One could select, say, lines rich in protein, but without spines.

To appreciate the implications of the variability, consider the following isolated examples of variability in key attributes of dry matter, as found in some 70 samples collected from the south-western United States:

- crude protein: 5.4–22.3%
- acid-detergent fiber: 20.1–48.8%
- acid-detergent lignin: 3.1–10.4%
- nitrate: 0.1–6.2%
- water-soluble oxalate: 0.2–9.1%

These figures are not the only important genetically determined variables, but they are illustrative. Note that the high values in the list differ from the corresponding low values by factors ranging from just over 2 for acid-detergent fibre to more than 60 for nitrate content. Other physical variables, such as size and spininess, also diverge markedly. As already noted, in many regions, the plant passes through its most palatable and vulnerable phase before the need for forage becomes more pressing. However, some strains are not spiny, so there is scope for breeding lines that are useful throughout most of the season. Note, too, that while some variables, such as protein content, should preferably be as high as possible, others, though harmless or even beneficial at low levels, may be undesirable or even dangerous at the highest recorded levels. For example, rumen flora in ruminants metabolise nitrate and oxalate profitably at modest concentrations, but if the concentration overwhelms their metabolic capacity, the unprocessed ions may poison livestock. Strains of plants selected for modest levels of such content can therefore be fed without strict precautions. Still, the toxic components of other strains would be best diluted by mixing Salsola fodder with other, safer forage or by treating it with mitigating agents. For example, excess soluble oxalate can be precipitated by adding lime to the fodder; precipitated oxalate is harmless. Digestibility also varied in this study, but the digestibility of Salsola was, in general, greater than the digestibility of grasses.

Another desirable trait of Salsola tragus and several related species is their salt-tolerance in arid, sandy environments. In fact, it seems to do best at salt levels that, though modest, are far too high for most crops to tolerate. Growing the plant in environments too saline for most other forage species, even high enough to stress the Salsola, actually increases some of its merits as a forage. In particular, it increases total nitrogen content but reduces levels of some (possibly harmless) potentially toxic substances, such as soluble oxalate and nitrate.

== Other problems and products ==
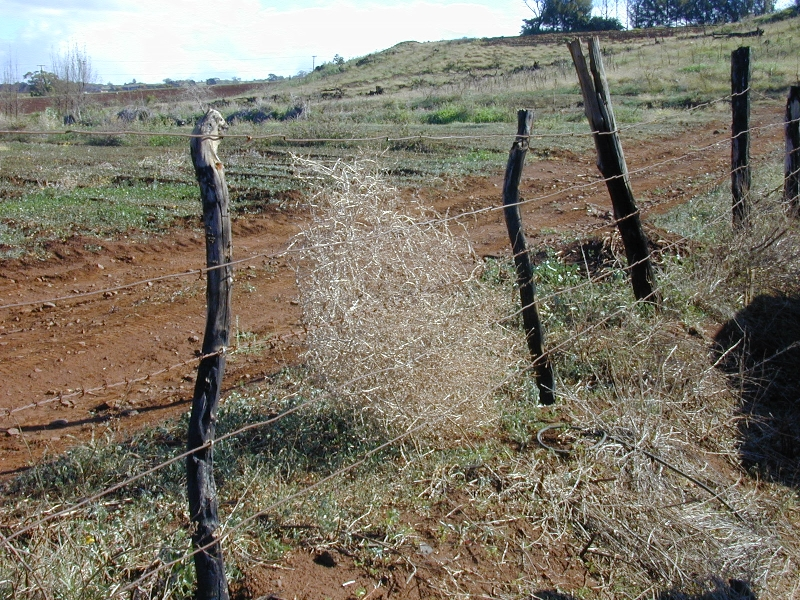
Salsola tragus caught against a fence in Omaopio, on the Hawaiian Island of Maui (December 2000).

One of the unwelcome attributes of Salsola tragus is that it commonly presents a fire hazard, firstly because it is flammable once it is thoroughly dry, partly as a result of its nitrate content, which may be very high, sometimes over 6% dry weight. Secondly, in a season in which the Salsola growth has been heavy, high winds often accumulate shocking tangles of the tumbleweeds, covering entire buildings or trapping vehicles so completely as to prevent unaided escape, particularly if the dry material ignites. When they bank up against wire fences, the force of the wind against the mass is likely to damage the fence, and so will the fire if the mass ignites. In wildfire conditions in open country, strong winds often blow burning tumbleweeds across firebreaks, frustrating standard fire control measures. When buildings or stacks stop the burning weeds, they ignite such objects more effectively than any other tumbleweed on the open plains, being compact and woody at maturity, as well as highly flammable.

The Salsola tragus complex has been associated with presumably allergic sensitivities to various parts of the plant. Many people develop skin rashes and assorted other reactions after exposure to the plant. Scratches and abrasions from the plant's spines or hard stems may cause itching or inflamed skin. Furthermore, fertilisation in this genus plus most species in the entire family is at least partly by wind pollination, and in some regions their pollen load may represent up to 5% of the total pollen load, causing many allergic sensitizations.

Some species are also harvested for the extraction of compounds such as the alkaloid "salsolin", used in the preparation of certain pharmaceuticals.

In its dried, tumbleweed form, the plant is generally difficult to work with, being springy, spiny, flammable and brittle, but like many other dried vegetable materials, primarily grass straw, it has been baled and used in building houses in regions such as parts of Nebraska, where not only timber, but even sod, often was in short supply.

Experimental work in Turkey suggests that chopped, milled, and briquetted, optionally with the addition of other organic wastes such as sawdust and nut shells, the woody tumbleweed waste makes a usable rural fuel.

In its freshly sprouted form, before it has developed spines or unpleasantly tough fibres, Salsola tragus has been recommended as a salad, stir-fry, or potherb for human consumption. Such dishes would be harmless in modest quantities or if the strain used has a low oxalate and nitrate content.

== Gallery ==
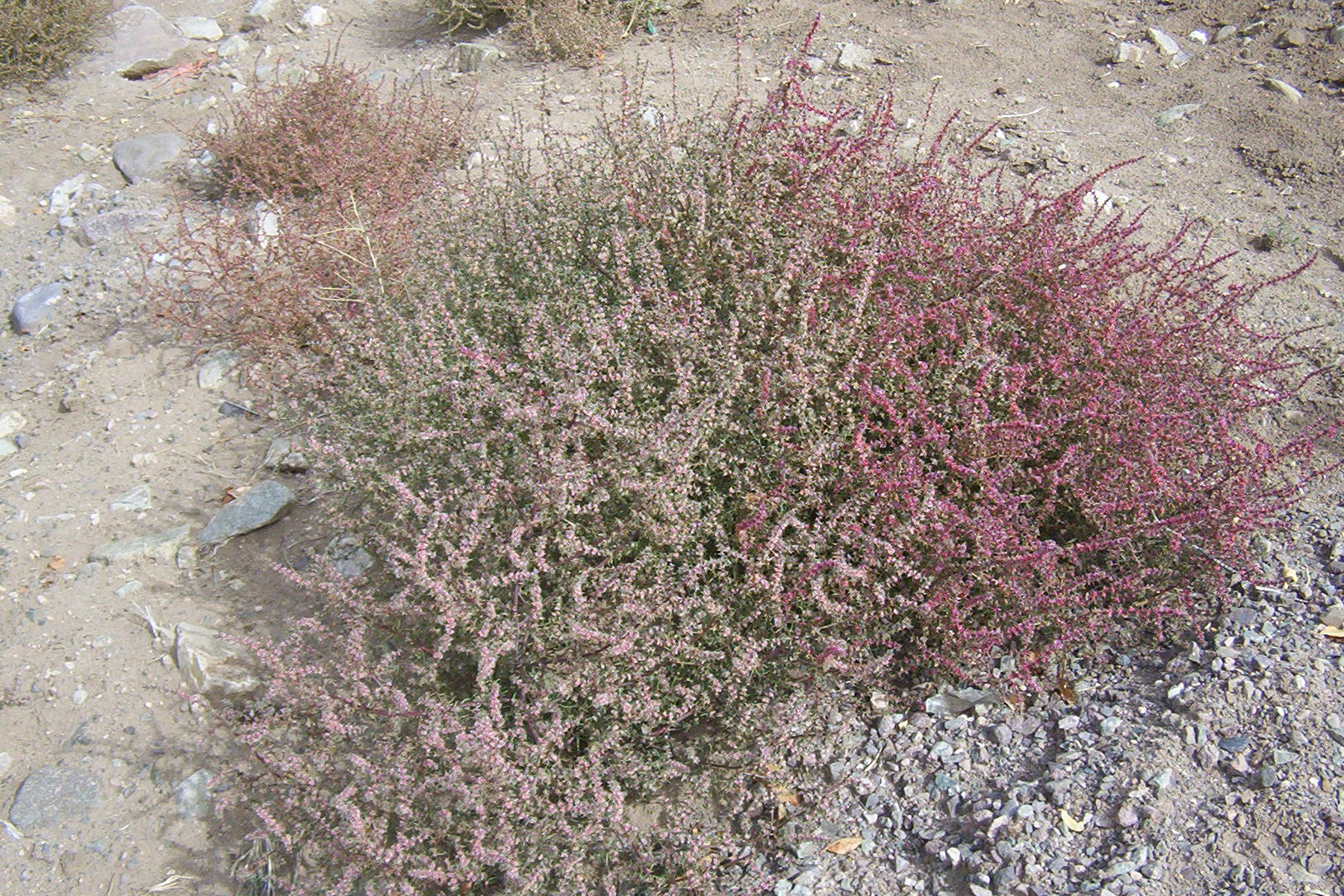
Two bushes, fruiting light pink and deep pink.

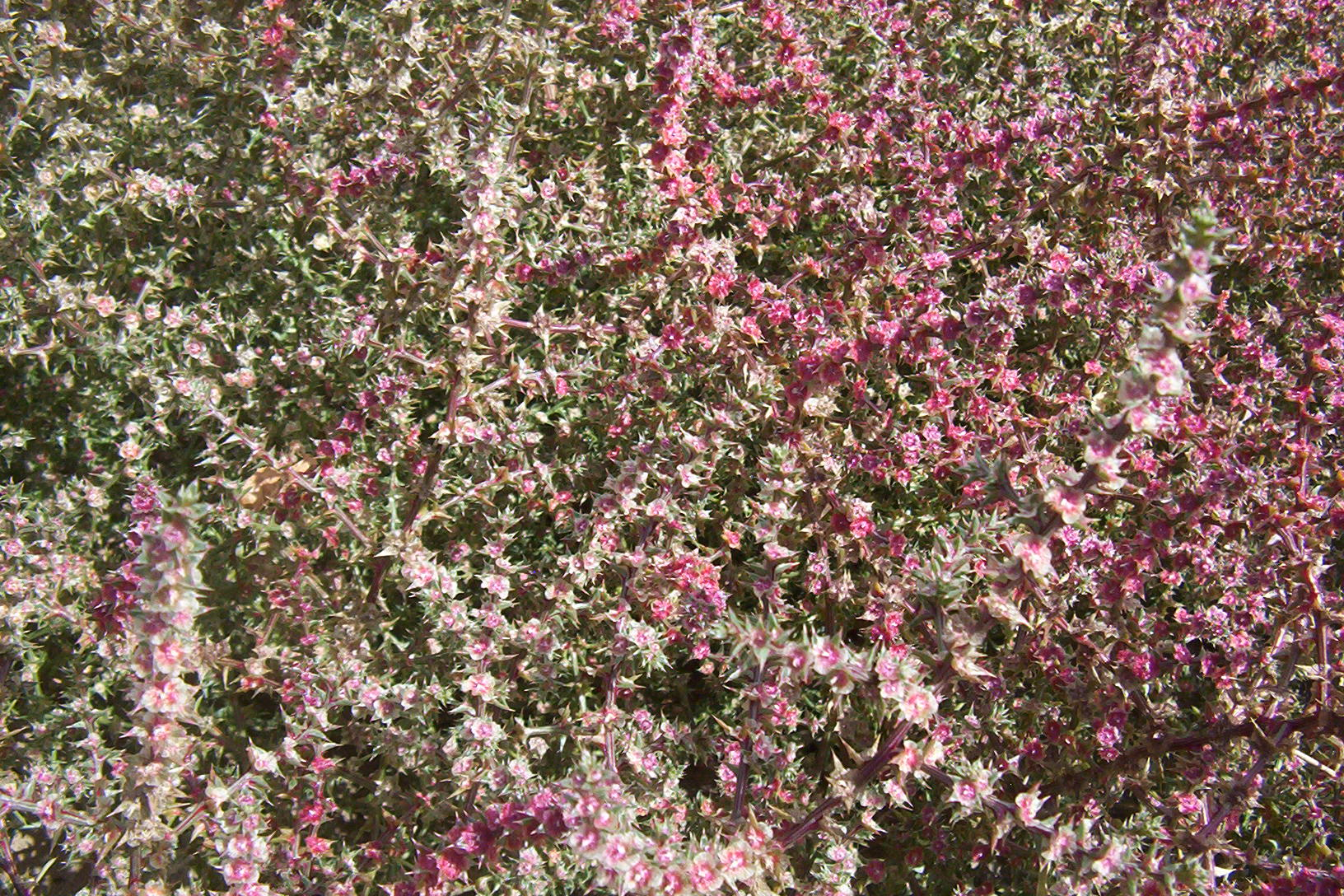
Close-up of fruiting bushes

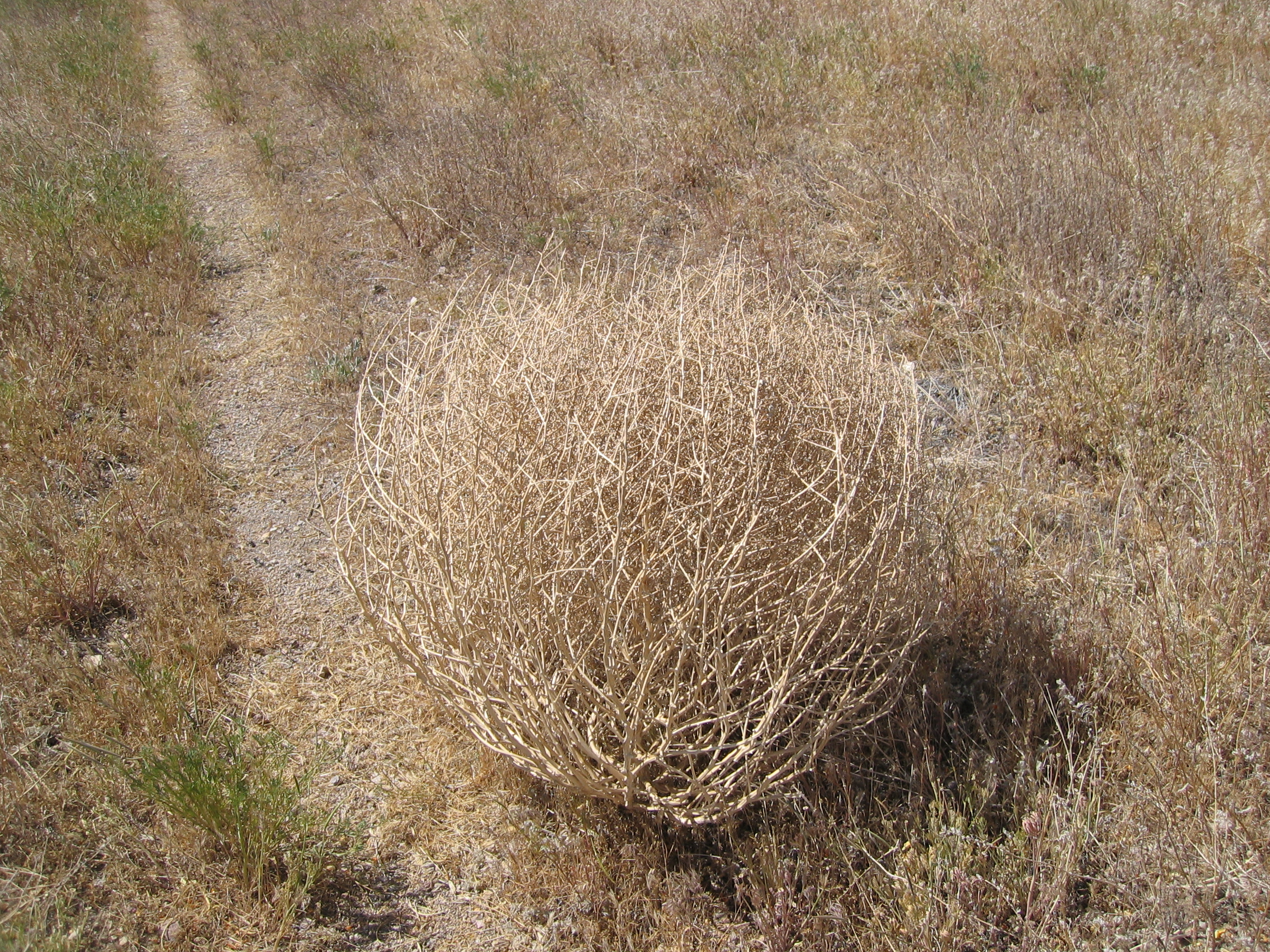
Salsola tragus in autumn.

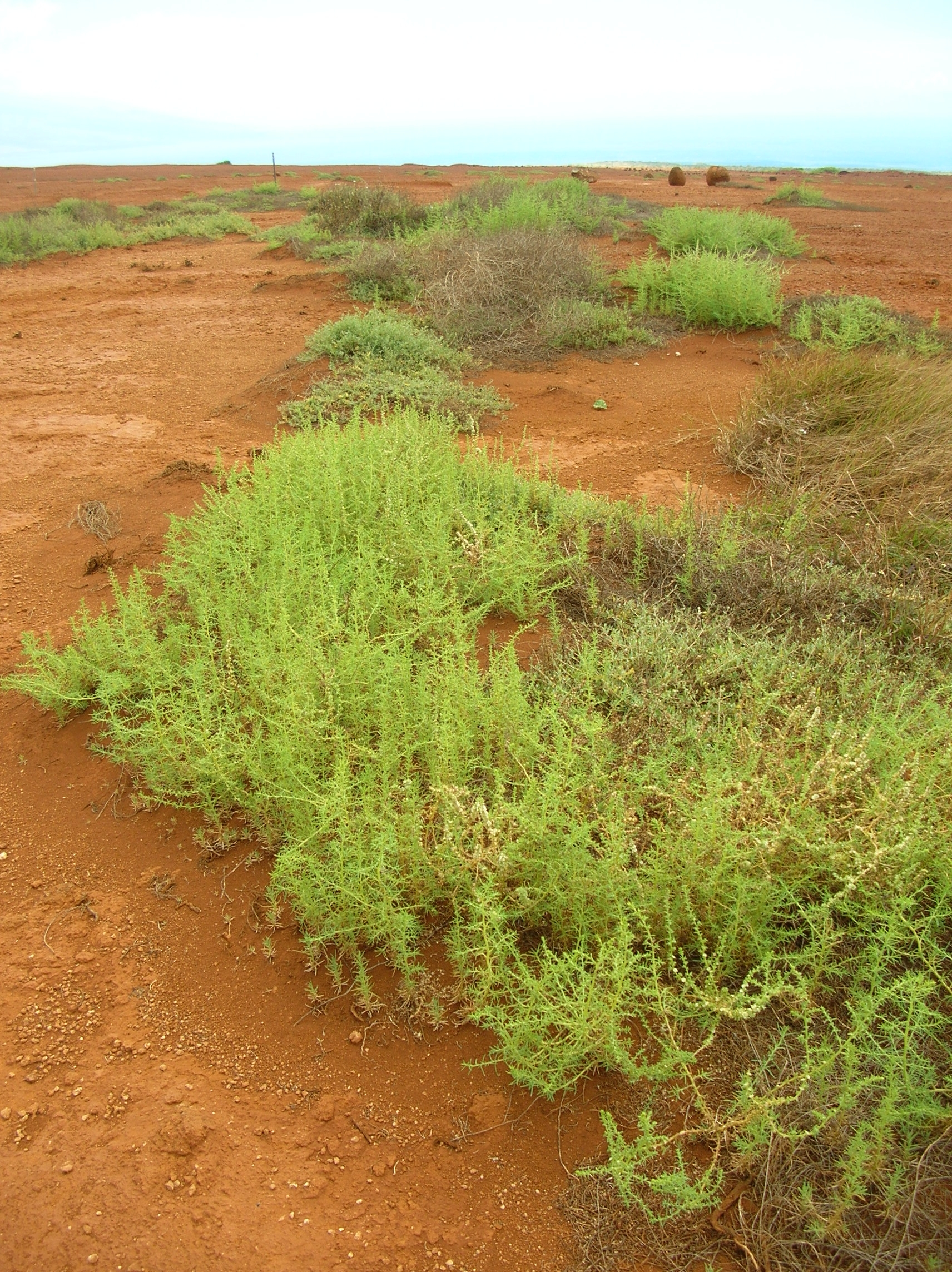
Salsola tragus on the Hawaiian Island of Kahoʻolawe.

== See also ==
- Oppositeleaf Russian thistle
- Russian globe thistle
- Salsola
- Tumbleweed
