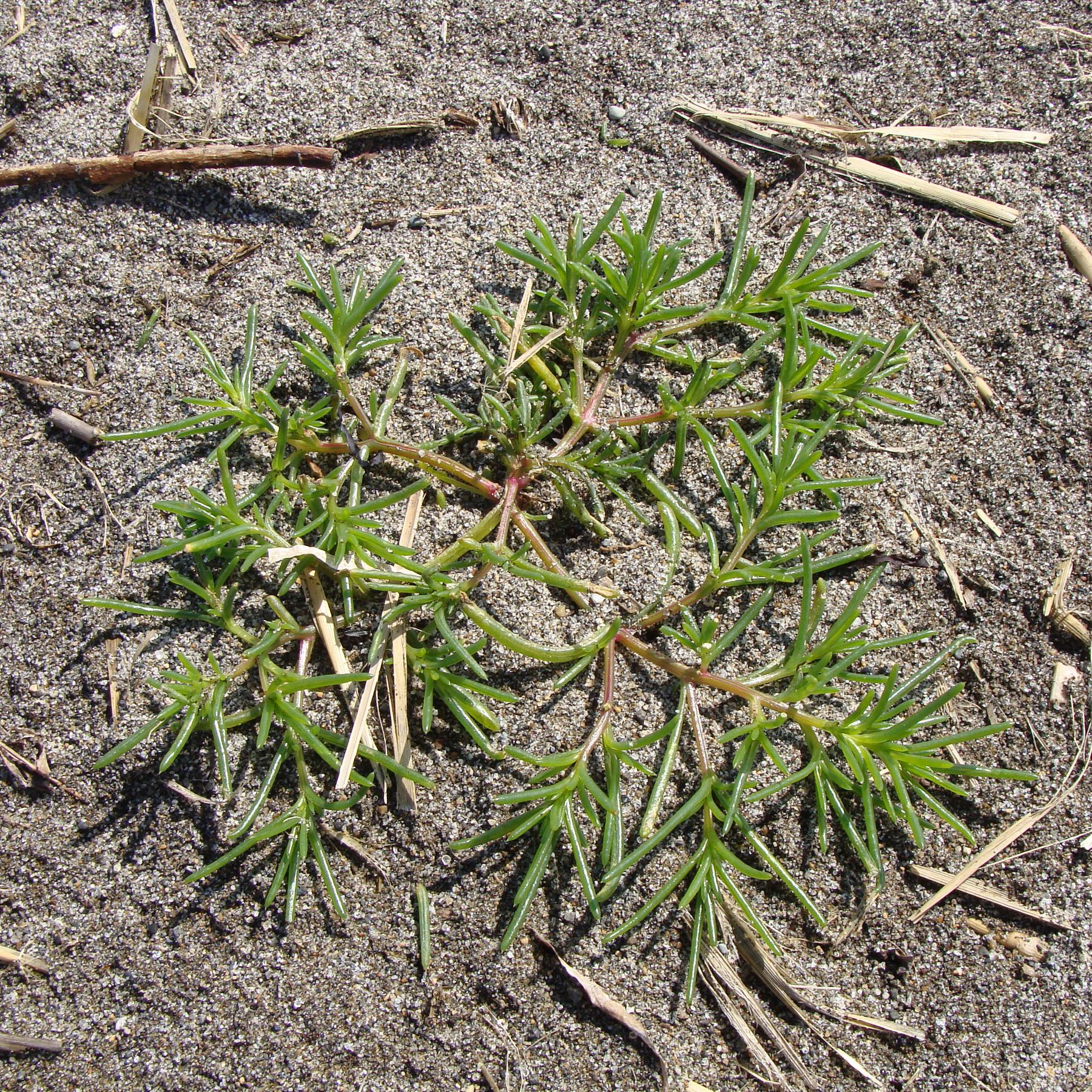
- In Aomori, Japan

Scientific classification
- Kingdom: Plantae
- Clade: Tracheophytes
- Clade: Angiosperms
- Clade: Eudicots
- Order: Caryophyllales
- Family: Amaranthaceae
- Genus: Salsola
- Species: S. komarovii

Binomial name
- Salsola komarovii Iljin

Synonyms
- Kali komarovii (Iljin) Akhani & Roalson

= Salsola komarovii =

Species of plant

Salsola komarovii is an annual plant native to China, Korea, Japan and eastern Russia. It grows to a height of 20 to 50 centimeters (8 to 20 in). It is cultivated as a vegetable; the leaves and young shoots are eaten. In Japanese it is known as okahijiki which translates as "land seaweed".
