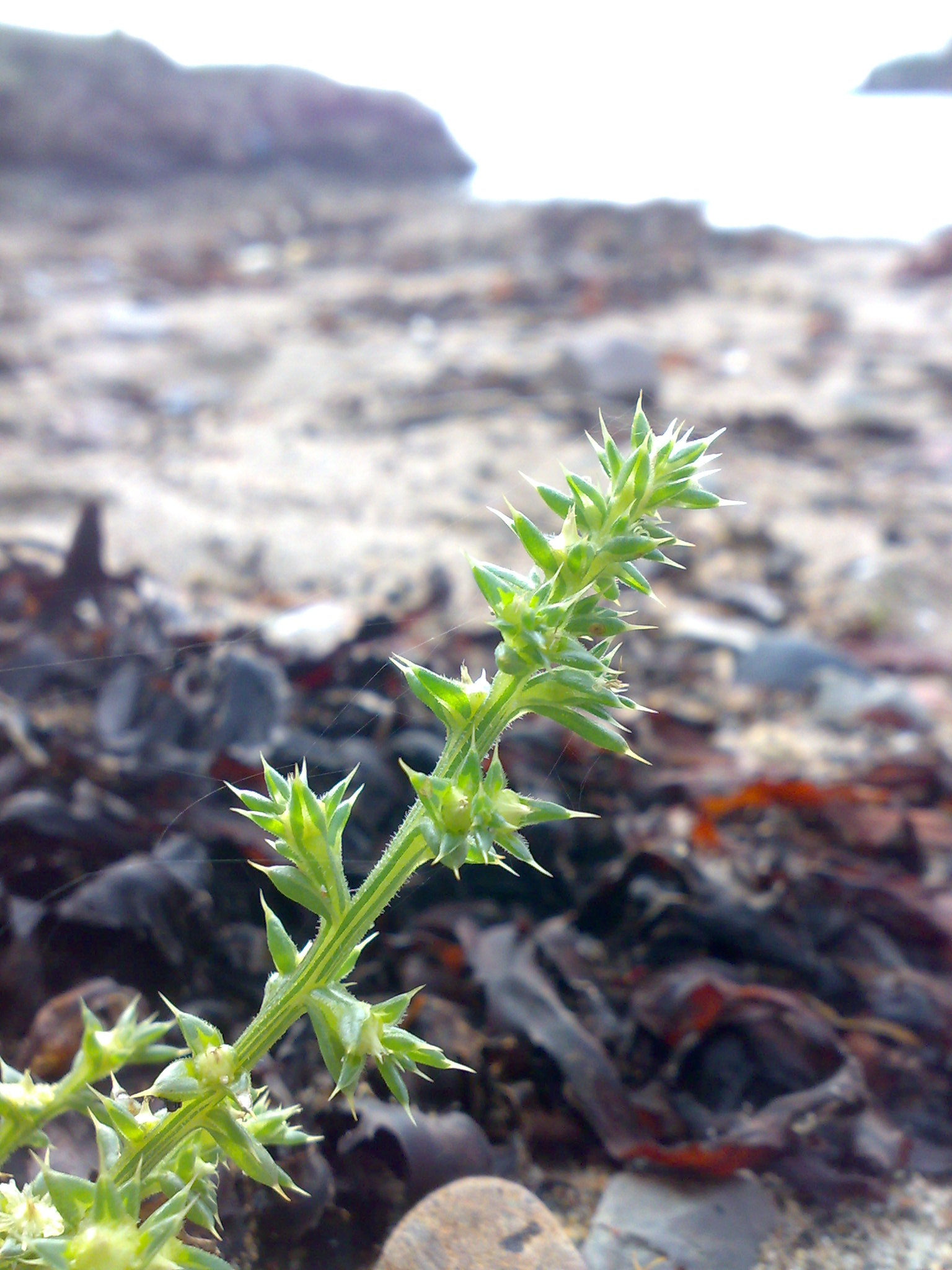

Scientific classification
- Kingdom: Plantae
- Clade: Tracheophytes
- Clade: Angiosperms
- Clade: Eudicots
- Order: Caryophyllales
- Family: Amaranthaceae
- Genus: Salsola
- Species: S. kali

Binomial name
- Salsola kali L.

Synonyms
- List: Corispermum pilosum Raf., nom. illeg.; Kali soda Moench, nom. illeg.; Kali turgidum (Dumort.) Gutermann; Salsola acicularis Salisb., nom. superfl.; Salsola aptera Iljin; Salsola decumbens Lam., nom. superfl.; Salsola gmelinii Rouy; Salsola kali subsp. austroafricana Aellen; Salsola kali subsp. gmelinii (Rouy) R.C.V.Douin; Salsola kali var. angustifolia Fenzl; Salsola kali var. apula Ten.; Salsola kali var. glabra Forssk.; Salsola kali var. hirta Ten., not validly publ.; Salsola kali var. hispida-polygama Forssk.; Salsola kali var. hispida Forssk.; Salsola kali var. mixta W.D.J.Koch; Salsola kali var. rosacea Moq., nom. illeg.; Salsola kali var. rosacea Pall.; Salsola kali var. rubella Moq.; Salsola kali var. spinosa (Lam.) Corb.; Salsola kali var. vulgaris W.D.J.Koch; Salsola scariosa Stokes; Salsola spinosa Lam.; Salsola turgida Dumort.

= Salsola kali =

Species of flowering plant in the amaranth family

Salsola kali is the restored botanical name for a species of flowering plants in the amaranth family that has been treated as Kali turgidum. It is native to Macaronesia, and from the Atlantic coasts of Europe to the Baltic Sea and the Mediterranean (although it has been introduced elsewhere). It is an annual plant which grows primarily in the temperate biome, in salty sandy coastal soils. It is commonly known as prickly saltwort or prickly glasswort.

In dry inland places it is replaced by Salsola tragus (syn. Kali tragus or Salsola kali subsp. tragus), which is less tolerant to salty soils, and has spread more widely from Eurasia to other continents. Salsola kali is less widespread as an introduced species in America.

== Taxonomy ==
The species was first described in 1753 as Salsola kali by Carl Linnaeus in Species Plantarum. Until 2007, it belonged to genus Salsola (sensu lato), but after molecular genetical research, it was proposed that the genus be split, and the species placed into the genus Kali Mill. (syn. Salsola sect. Kali Dum.). In the genus Kali, the valid name is Kali turgidum (Dumort.) Guterm. (incorrectly as "turgida", basionym: Salsola turgida Dumort.). The name Kali soda Moench used by Akhani et al. (2007) is invalid because of the older name Kali soda Scop. (a synonym of Salsola soda). As of March 2024, Plants of the World Online subsumed all Kali species into Salsola.

Salsola kali belongs to tribe Salsoleae s. str. Salsola kali and other closely related species form a species complex (Salsola kali-aggregate or formerly Kali tragus-aggregate). Some authors treat these species only on subspecies level. Then Salsola kali would be the valid name for the whole species complex, and the former Kali turgidum would be a subspecies of it.

It was previously thought that Salsola kali had two subspecies:

- Salsola kali subsp. tragus, syn. Kali tragus, now treated as Salsola tragus, a common weed of disturbed habitats, commonly known as prickly Russian thistle, windwitch, common saltwort, or tumbleweed.
- Salsola kali subsp. kali, syn. Kali turgidum, now simply treated as ''Salsola kali, a salt-resistant plant restricted to the shores of the Baltic Sea, North Sea and the Atlantic Ocean, commonly known as prickly saltwort.

As of March 2024, no subspecies were accepted by Plants of the World Online.

In 2014, Mosyakin et al. proposed to conserve Salsola kali (= Kali turgidum) as nomenclatoral type for the genus Salsola. This is now accepted, with many species of genus Kali restored to Salsola, with some Palaearctic species placed in the genus Soda.

== Alkali and soda ash ==
The plant is a halophyte, i.e. it grows where the water is salty, and the plant is a succulent, i.e. it holds much salty water. When the plant is burned, the sodium in the salt ends up in the chemical sodium carbonate. Sodium carbonate has a number of practical uses, including especially as an ingredient in making glass, and making soap. In the medieval and early modern centuries the Kali plant and others like it were collected at tidal marshes and seashores. The collected plants were burned. The resulting ashes were mixed with water. Sodium carbonate is soluble in water. Non-soluble components of the ashes sank to the bottom of the water container. The water with the sodium carbonate dissolved in it was then transferred to another container, and then the water was evaporated off, leaving behind the sodium carbonate. Another major component of the ashes that is soluble in water is potassium carbonate. The resulting product consisted mainly of a mixture of sodium carbonate and potassium carbonate. This product was called "soda ash" (was also called "alkali"). Soda ash extracted from the ashes of Salsola kali contains as much as 30% sodium carbonate. The soda ash was used primarily to make glass (secondarily used as a cleaning agent). Another notable halophilic plant that was collected for the purpose was Soda inermis (syn. Salsola soda). Another was Halogeton sativus. Historically in the late medieval and early post-medieval centuries the word "kali" could refer to any such plants. (The words "alkali" and "kali" come from the Arabic word for soda ash, al-qali, where al- is the definite article.) Today such plants are also called saltworts, referring to their relatively high salt content. Because of their use historically in making glass, they are also called glassworts. In Spain the saltwort plants were called barilla and were the basis of a large industry in Spain in the 18th century; see barilla. In the early 19th century, plant sources were supplanted by synthetic sodium carbonate produced using the Leblanc process.

== See also ==
- Prickly Russian thistle
- Russian globe thistle
- Tumbleweed
