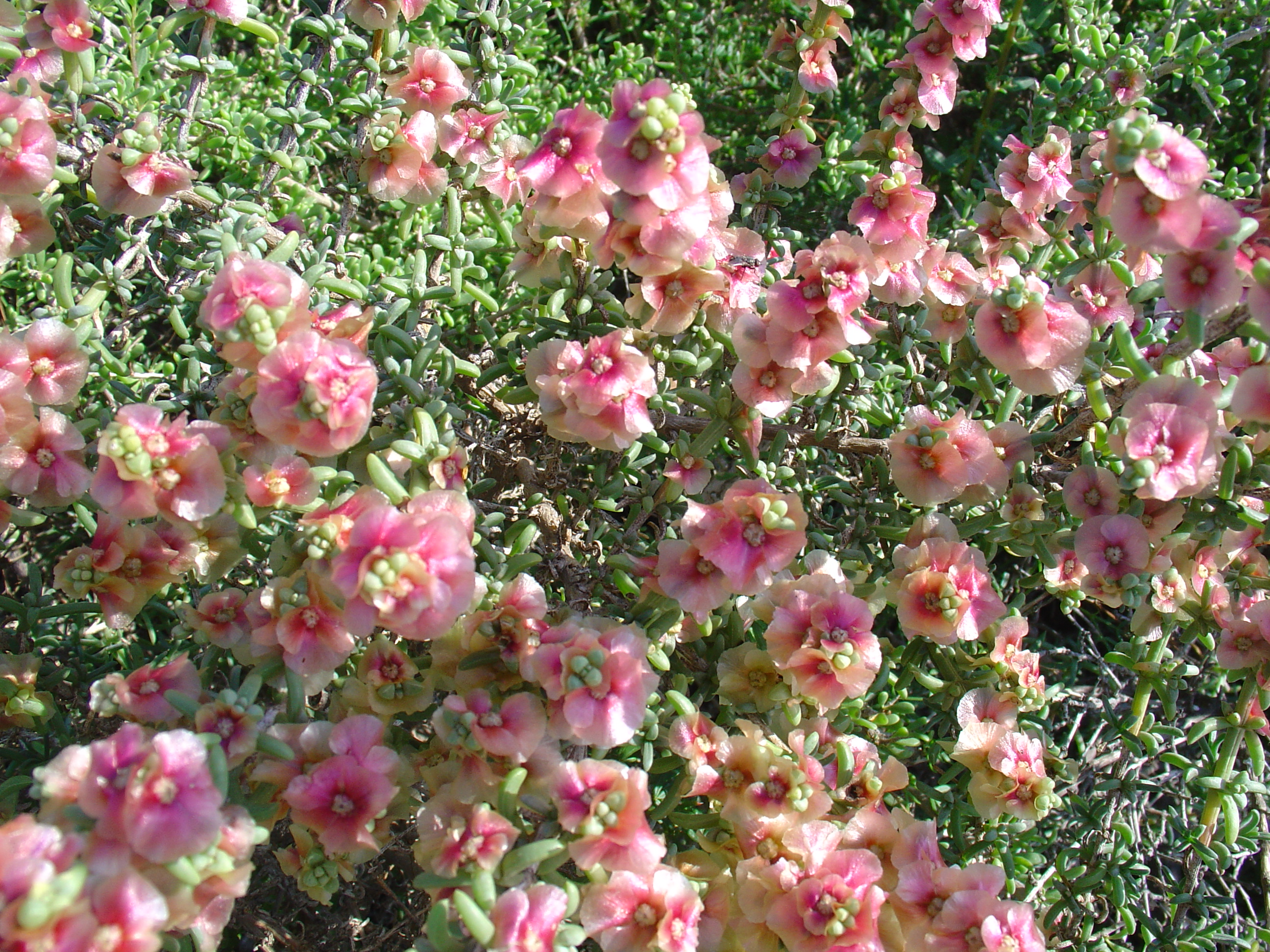
- Salsola oppositifolia

Scientific classification
- Kingdom: Plantae
- Clade: Tracheophytes
- Clade: Angiosperms
- Clade: Eudicots
- Order: Caryophyllales
- Family: Amaranthaceae
- Subfamily: Salsoloideae
- Tribe: Salsoleae
- Genus: Salsola; L.

Synonyms
- Caspia Galushko; Darniella Maire & Weiller; Eremochion Gilli; Hypocylix Woł.; Isgarum Raf.; Kali Mill.; Neocaspia Tzvelev; Physandra Botsch.

= Salsola =

Genus of plants

Salsola is a genus of the subfamily Salsoloideae in the family Amaranthaceae. The genus sensu stricto is distributed in Australia, central and southwestern Asia, North Africa, and the Mediterranean. Common names of various members of this genus and related genera are saltwort (for their salt tolerance) and tumbleweed or roly-poly. The genus name Salsola is from the Latin salsus, meaning 'salty'.

== Description ==
The species of Salsola are mostly subshrubs, shrubs, small trees, and rarely annuals. The leaves are mostly alternate, rarely opposite, simple, and entire. The bisexual flowers have five tepals and five stamens. The pistil ends in two stigmata. The fruit is spherical with a spiral embryo and no perisperm.

== Systematics ==
The genus name Salsola was first published in 1753 by Linnaeus in Species Plantarum. The type species is Salsola soda L.

The genus Salsola belongs to the tribe Salsoleae s.s. of the subfamily Salsoloideae in the family Amaranthaceae. The genus was recircumscribed in 2007 based on molecular phylogenetic research, greatly reducing the number of species. Synonyms of Salsola sensu stricto are: Darniella Maire & Weiller, Fadenia Aellen & Townsend, Neocaspia Tzvelev and Hypocylix Wol..

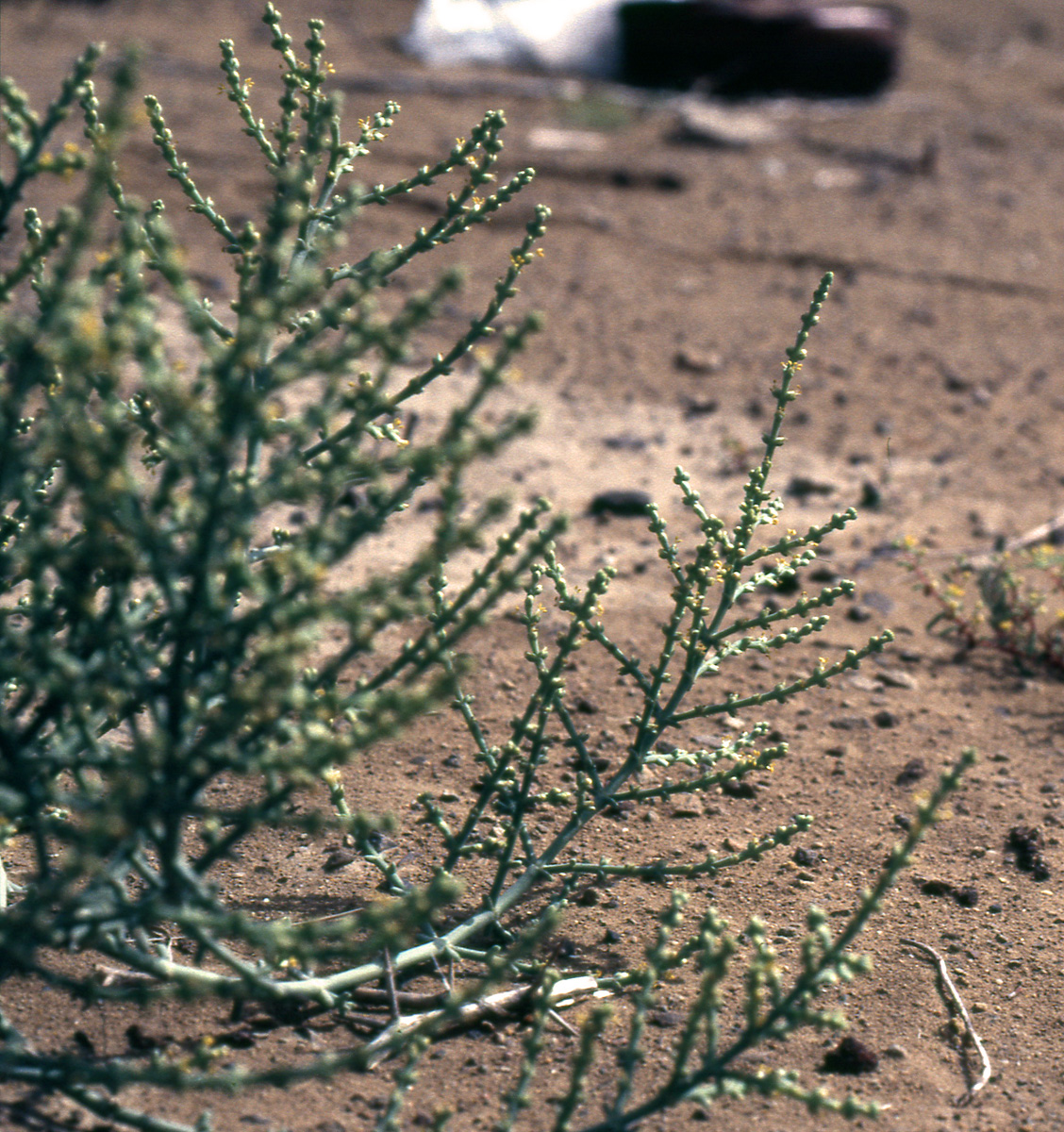
Salsola stocksii

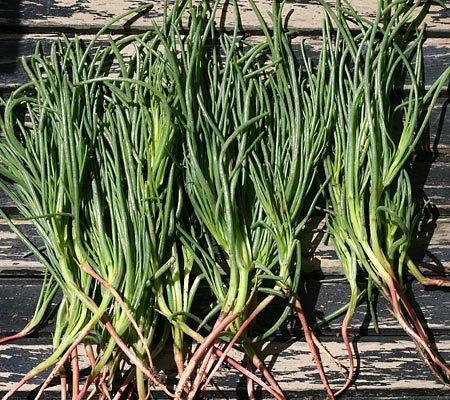
Harvested Salsola soda

Plants of the World Online includes:

- Salsola acanthoclada Botsch.
- Salsola africana (Brenan) Botsch.
- Salsola algeriensis Botsch.
- Salsola angusta Botsch.
- Salsola australis R.Br.
- Salsola austrotibetica Sukhor.
- Salsola baranovii Iljin
- Salsola basaltica (C.Brullo, Brullo, Gaskin, Giusso, Hrusa & Salmeri) C.Brullo & Brullo
- Salsola brevifolia Desf.
- Salsola chellalensis Botsch.
- Salsola chinghaiensis A.J.Li
- Salsola collina Pall.
- Salsola cruciata L.Chevall. ex Batt. & Trab.
- Salsola drummondii Ulbr.
- Salsola euryphylla Botsch.
- Salsola glomerata (Maire) Brullo
- Salsola × gobicola Iljin
- Salsola griffithii (Bunge) Freitag & Khani
- Salsola gypsacea Botsch.
- Salsola halimocnemis Botsch.
- Salsola hartmannii Sukhor.
- Salsola ikonnikovii Iljin
- Salsola intramongolica H.C.Fu & Z.Y.Chu
- Salsola jacquemontii Moq.
- Salsola junatovii Botsch.
- Salsola kali L.
- Salsola komarovii Iljin
- Salsola mairei Botsch.
- Salsola masclansii G.Monts. & D.Gómez
- Salsola melitensis Botsch.
- Salsola monoptera Bunge
- Salsola papillosa (Coss.) Willk.
- Salsola paulsenii Litv.
- Salsola pontica (Pall.) Iliin
- Salsola praecox (Litv.) Litv.
- Salsola praemontana Botsch.
- Salsola ryanii Hrusa & Gaskin
- Salsola sabrinae Mosyakin
- Salsola sinkiangensis A.J.Li
- Salsola squarrosa Steven ex Moq.
- Salsola strobilifera (Benth.) Mosyakin
- Salsola subglabra Botsch.
- Salsola tamamschjanae Iljin
- Salsola tamariscina Pall.
- Salsola tragus L. (sometimes placed in Kali)
- Salsola tunetana Brullo
- Salsola turcica Yıld.
- Salsola webbii Moq.
- Salsola zaidamica Iljin
- Salsola zygophylla Batt.

Excluded species: Many species formerly grouped in Salsola were excluded by Akhani et al. (2007). Some may now be classified in separate genera:

- Afrosalsola
  - Afrosalsola deschaseauxiana (Litard. & Maire) Akhani (syn. Salsola deschaseauxiana (Litard. & Maire)
  - Afrosalsola divaricata (Masson ex Link) Akhani (syn. Salsola divaricata (Masson ex Link)
- Caroxylon (for Salsola sect. Caroxylon)
  - Caroxylon imbricatum (Forssk.) Moq. (syn. Salsola imbricata Forssk.)
  - Caroxylon vermiculatum (L.) Akhani & Roalson (syn. Salsola vermiculata L.)
- Kaviria (for Salsola sect. Belanthera)
- Turania (for Salsola sect. Sogdiana)
- Xylosalsola (for Salsola sect. Coccosalsola subsect. Arbuscula)

They are shrubby halophytic plants with opposite and alternate branches and leaves. They have a distinct leaf anatomy with a hypodermis and kranz-like cells that perform C_{2} photosynthesis, a C_{3}-C_{4} intermediate photosynthetic pathway. The species were formerly included in the genus Salsola, which was found to be polyphyletic. In 2024 Hossein Akhani et al. described the new genus Afrosalsola to include the two species.

== Uses ==
Salsola komarovii is collected in the wild and cultivated in Asia. In Namibia, where introduced Salsola species are called gannabos, they are valuable fodder plants.
