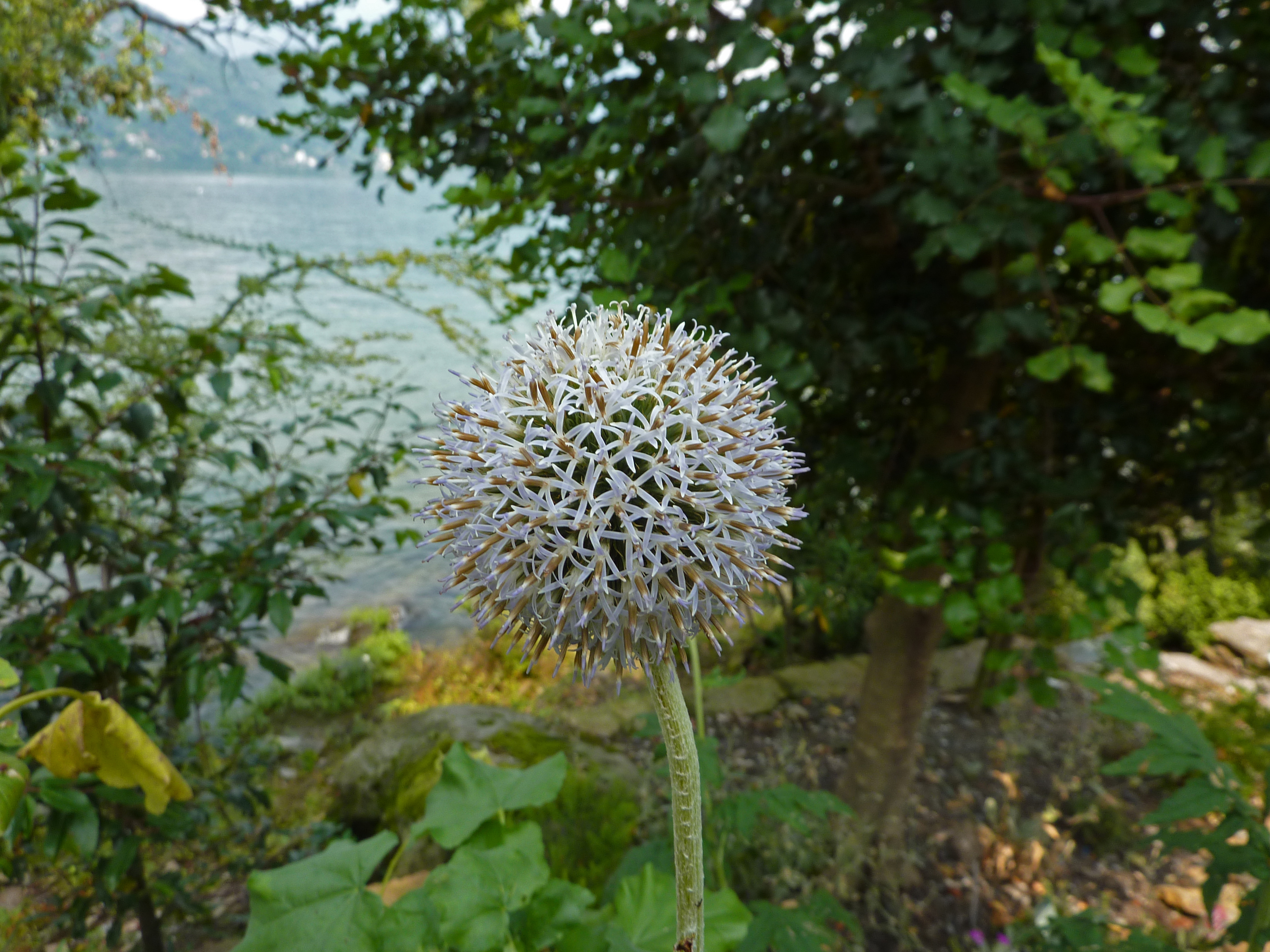

Scientific classification
- Kingdom: Plantae
- Clade: Tracheophytes
- Clade: Angiosperms
- Clade: Eudicots
- Clade: Asterids
- Order: Asterales
- Family: Asteraceae
- Genus: Echinops
- Species: E. exaltatus

Binomial name
- Echinops exaltatus Schrad. 1818 not Koch 1843

Synonyms
- Echinops commutatus Jur.; Echinops eglandulosus Schur; Echinops globifer Janka; Echinops mollis Schur; Echinops strictus Fisch. ex Sims.

= Echinops exaltatus =

Species of flowering plant

Echinops exaltatus, the Russian globe thistle or tall globe thistle, is European species of globe thistle in the family Asteraceae. It is native to central and eastern Europe from Germany and Italy east into Russia. The species has escaped cultivation and become established in the wild in scattered locations in eastern Canada and the northern United States.

== Description ==
Echinops exaltatus is the largest of all globe thistles, a branching perennial herb up to 150 cm (60 inches or 5 feet) tall. One plant can produces several flower heads, each with a very nearly spherical array of white or pale blue disc florets but no ray florets.
