= Chenopodium incognitum =

Scientific classification
- Kingdom: Plantae
- Clade: Tracheophytes
- Clade: Angiosperms
- Clade: Eudicots
- Order: Caryophyllales
- Family: Amaranthaceae
- Genus: Chenopodium
- Species: C. incognitum

Binomial name
- Chenopodium incognitum Wahl

Species of flowering plant

Chenopodium incognitum is a species of annual flowering plant in the family Amaranthaceae. It is difficult to tell apart from Chenopodium hians and Chenopodium atrovirens is often synonymized with one of those species by botanical authorities.

== Description ==
Chenopodium incognitum is an annual herb growing about 30–120 centimeters in height. It branches from its base with the side stems arching upward in a bow shape. The leaves are narrow and ovate to deltoid-ovate, egg shaped to somewhat more triangular, and 1.5–3.5–centimeters in length. The leaves of C. incognitum lack lobes or have only a few small lobes at their base with a mealy or dusty powder on their undersides.

The flowers are tightly packed spikes that are found both at the ends of its stems and where the plant branches. Each flower have five dusty to mealy (farinose) sepals. After blooming the sepals half cover the seeds at their maturity. The when fully ripe seed is black, flattened, with a rounded margin, and 1.2–1.5 millimeters in diameter. The pericarp starts out dark with yellow or golden spots, but as it ages it becomes brown or dark red with cream yellow spots.

== Taxonomy ==
Chenopodium incognitum was first scientifically described and named by Herbert Alexander Wahl in 1916. It is currently recognized as a valid species by Plants of the World Online (POWO). It is synonymized with Chenopodium atrovirens by World Flora Online and with Chenopodium hians by Flora of North America.

== Range ==
According to POWO Chenopodium incognitum is native to and grows from the Yukon Territory in the north south all the way to New Mexico. Including the Yukon, British Columbia, Alberta, and Saskatchewan in Canada. In the United States it grows in Arizona, Colorado, Montana, Nevada, New Mexico, Utah, and Wyoming.
