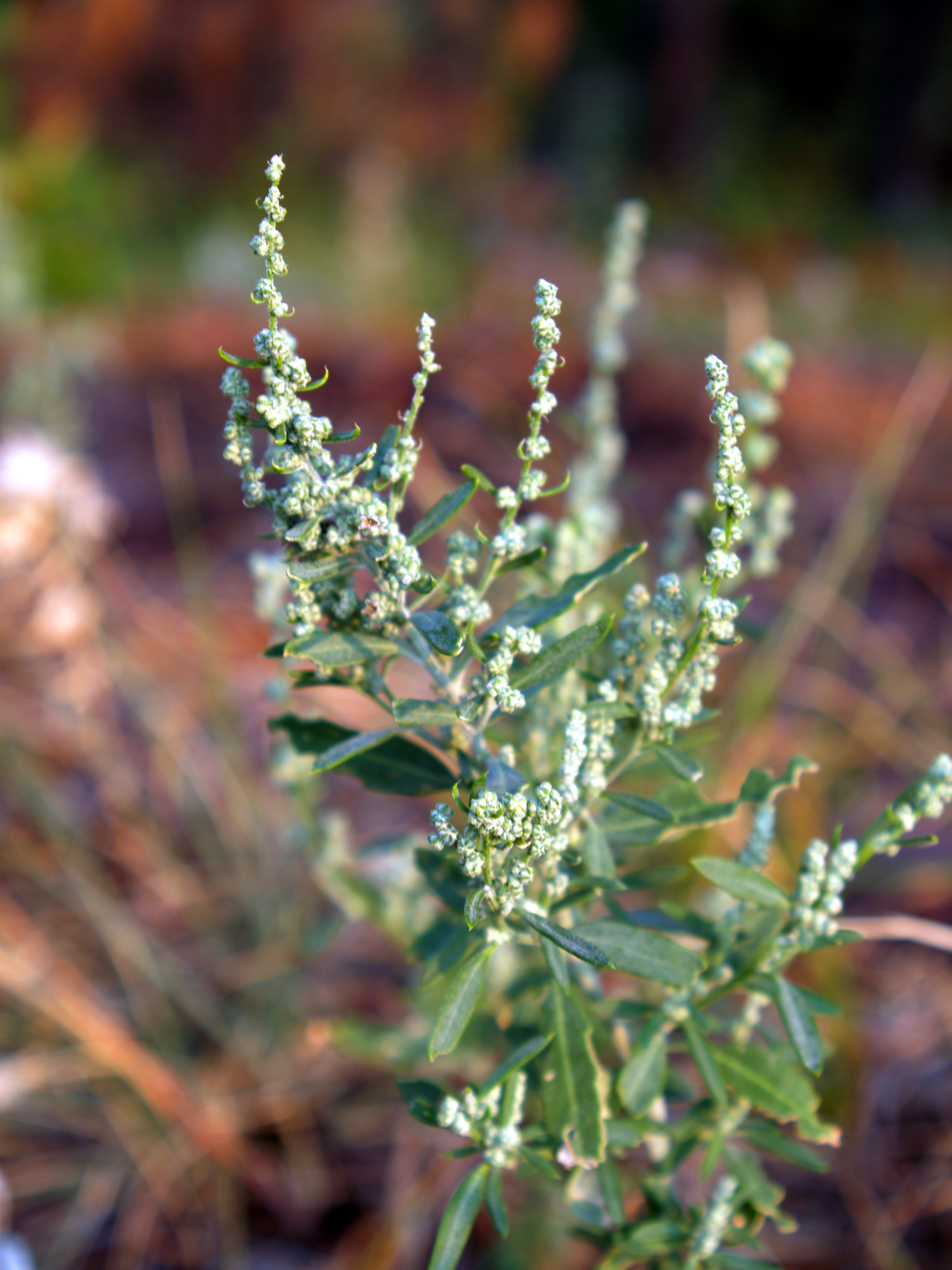
- Chenopodium berlandieri

Scientific classification
- Kingdom: Plantae
- Clade: Embryophytes
- Clade: Tracheophytes
- Clade: Spermatophytes
- Clade: Angiosperms
- Clade: Eudicots
- Order: Caryophyllales
- Family: Amaranthaceae
- Subfamily: Chenopodioideae
- Tribe: Atripliceae
- Genus: Chenopodium; L. (1753)

Species
- 132; see text

Synonyms
- Agatophyton Fourr. (1869); Blitum Hill (1757), nom. illeg.; Botrys Rchb. ex Nieuwl. (1914); Einadia Raf. (1838); Rhagodia R.Br. (1810); Vulvaria Bubani (1897), nom. illeg.; Chenopodium sect. Leprophyllum Dumort.; Chenopodium sect. Chenopodiastrum Moq.

= Chenopodium =

Genus of flowering plants in the amaranth family

Chenopodium is a genus of numerous species of perennial or annual herbaceous flowering plants known as the goosefoot, which occur almost anywhere in the world. It is placed in the family Amaranthaceae in the APG II system; older classification systems, notably the widely used Cronquist system, separate it and its relatives as Chenopodiaceae, but this leaves the rest of the Amaranthaceae polyphyletic. However, among the Amaranthaceae, the genus Chenopodium is the namesake member of the subfamily Chenopodioideae.

== Description ==
The species of Chenopodium (s.str., description according to Fuentes et al. 2012) are annual or perennial herbs, shrubs or small trees. They generally rely on alkaline soil. They are nonaromatic, but sometimes fetid (foul-smelling). The young stems and leaves are often densely covered by vesicular globose hairs, thus looking farinose. Characteristically, these trichomes persist, collapsing later and becoming cup-shaped. The branched stems grow erect, ascending, prostrate or scrambling. Lateral branches are alternate (the lowermost ones can be nearly opposite). The alternate or opposite leaves are petiolate. Their thin or slightly fleshy leaf blade is linear, rhombic or triangular-hastate, with entire or dentate or lobed margins.

Inflorescences are standing terminal and lateral. They consist of spicately or paniculately arranged glomerules of flowers. Plants are monoecious (rarely dioecious). In monoecious plants flowers are dimorphic or pistillate. Flowers consist of (4–) 5 perianth segments connate, basally (at the base) or close to the middle, usually membranous margined and with a roundish to keeled back; almost always 5 stamens, and one ovary with 2 stigmas.

In fruit, perianth segments become sometimes coloured, but mostly keep unchanged, somewhat closing over or spreading from the fruit. The pericarp is membranous or sometimes succulent, adherent to or loosely covering the seed. The horizontally oriented seeds are depressed-globular to lenticular, with rounded to subacute margin. The black seed coat is almost smooth to finely striate, rugulose or pitted.

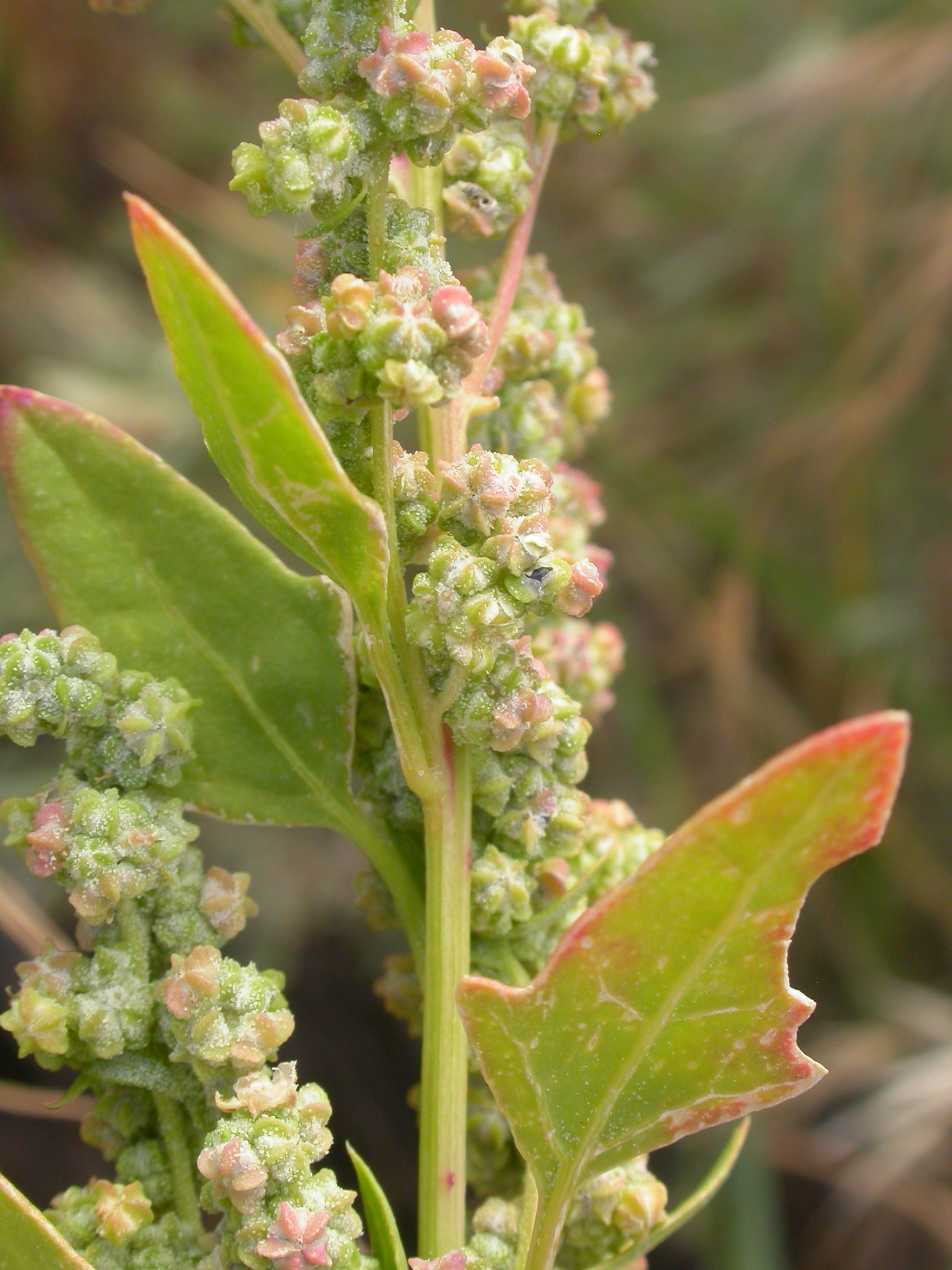
C. album (White goosefoot)

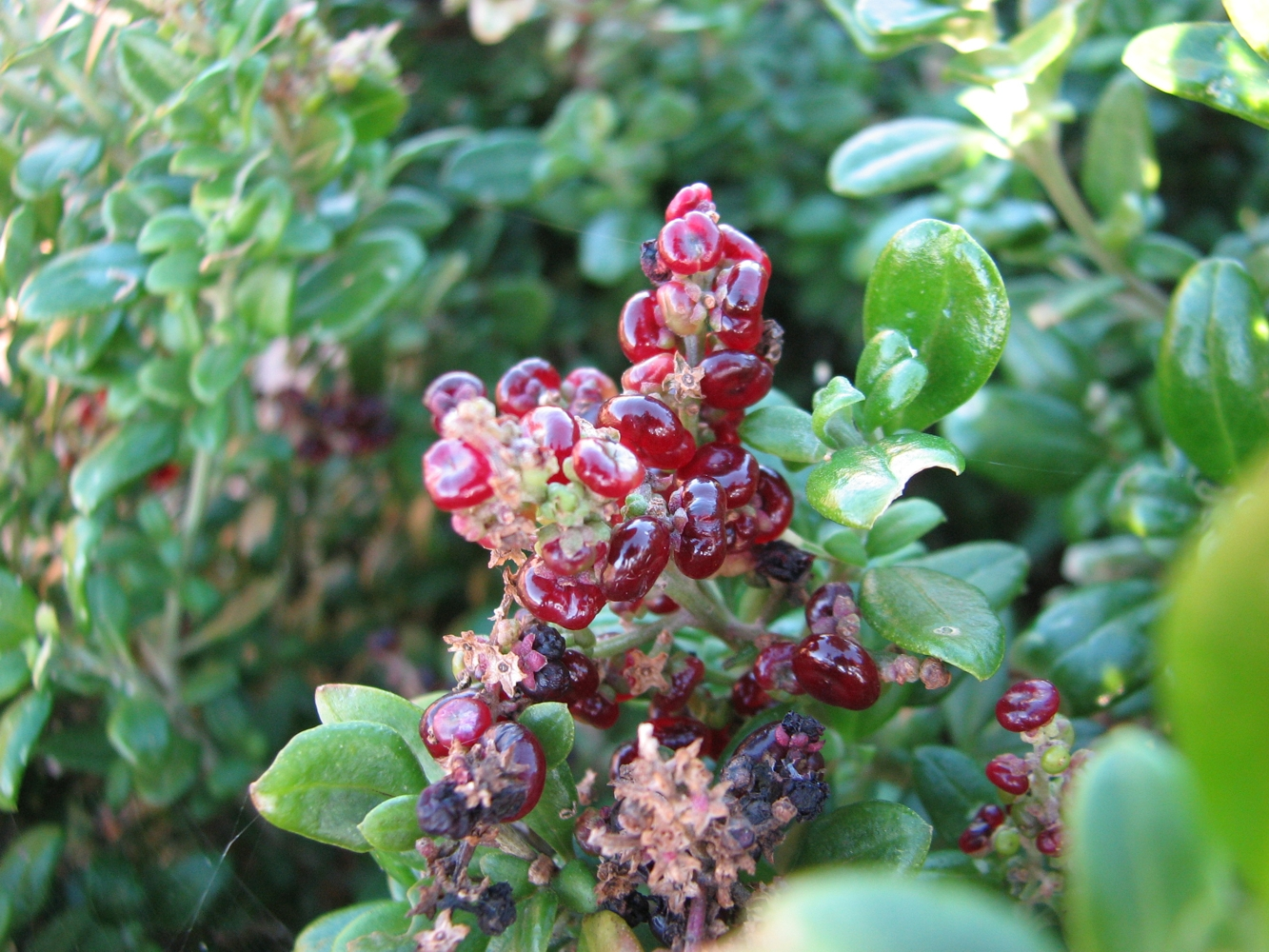
Chenopodium candolleanum

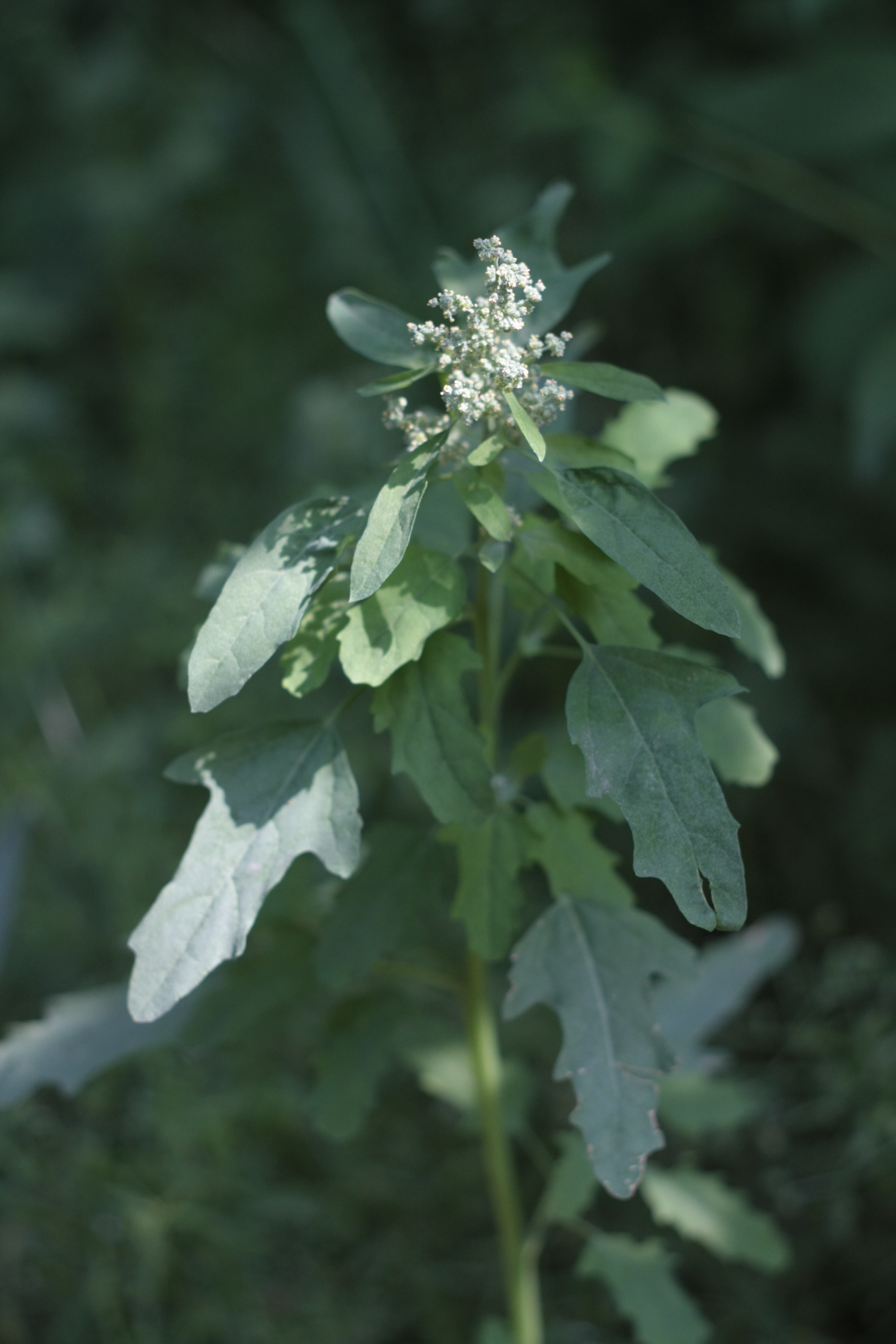
C. ficifolium

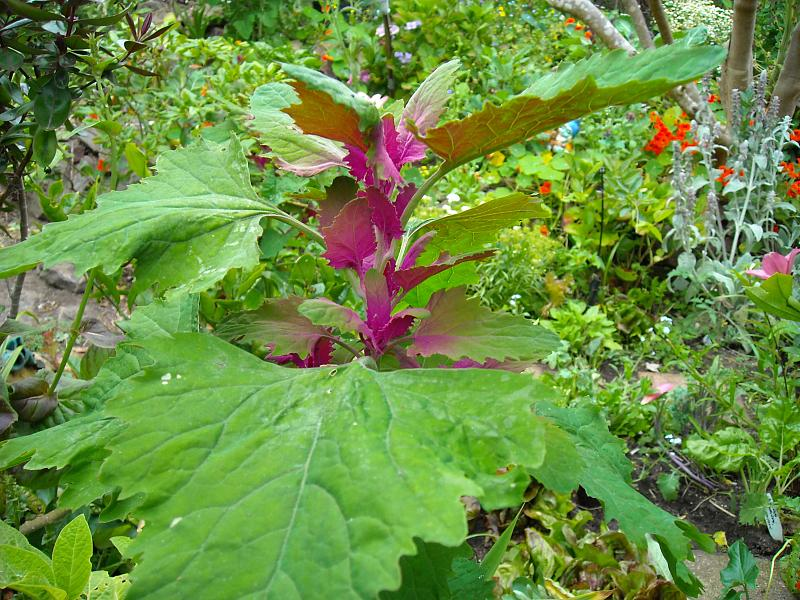
C. giganteum

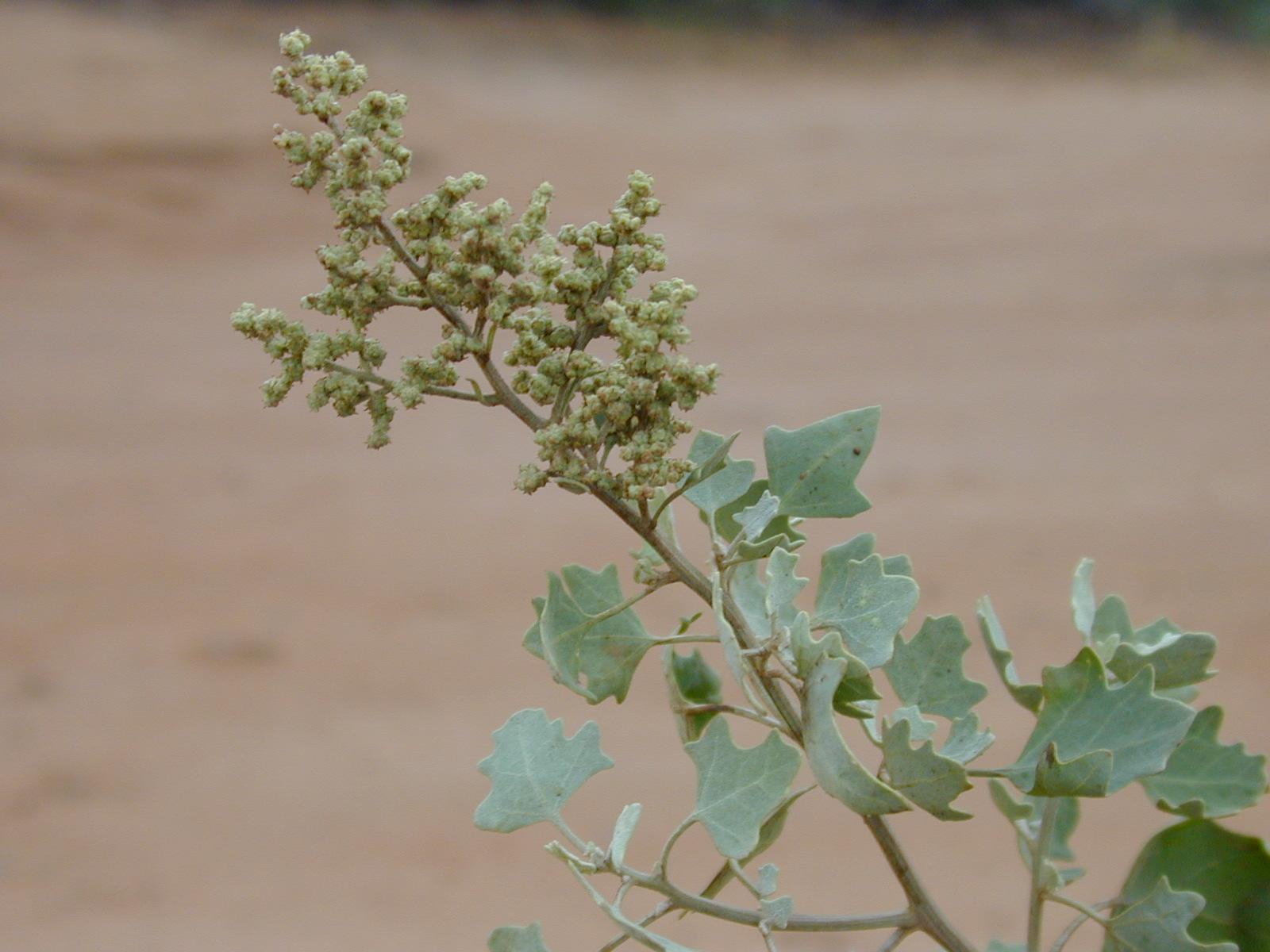
ʻĀheahea (C. oahuense)

== Taxonomy ==
The genus Chenopodium was described by Carl Linnaeus in 1753 (In: Species Plantarum, Vol. 1, p. 218–222). Type species is Chenopodium album. This generic name is derived from the particular shape of the leaf, which is similar to a goose's foot: from Greek χήν (chen), "goose" and πούς (pous), "foot" or ποδίον (podion), "little foot".

In its traditional circumscription, Chenopodium comprised about 170 species. Phylogenetic research revealed that the genus was highly polyphyletic and did not reflect how species were naturally related. Mosyakin & Clemants (2002, 2008) separated the glandular species as genus Dysphania (which includes epazote) and Teloxys in tribe Dysphanieae. Fuentes-Bazan et al. (2012) separated many species to genera Blitum (in tribe Anserineae), Chenopodiastrum, Lipandra, and Oxybasis (like Chenopodium in tribe Atripliceae). They included Rhagodia and Einadia in Chenopodium.

=== Species ===
132 species are currently accepted.

- Chenopodium acerifolium Andrz.
- Chenopodium aciculare (Paul G.Wilson) S.Fuentes & Borsch
- Chenopodium acuminatum Willd.
- Chenopodium adpressifolium Pandeya & A.Pandeya
- Chenopodium albescens Small
- Chenopodium album L. – white goosefoot, nickel greens, dungweed, bathua, chandali, chandaliya, fat hen, lamb's quarters, pigweed
  - Chenopodium album var. album (synonym Chenopodium strictum Roth)
- Chenopodium allanii Aellen
- Chenopodium atripliciforme Murr
- Chenopodium atrovirens Rydb. – dark goosefoot, pinyon goosefoot
- Chenopodium attenuatum Charit.
- Chenopodium aureum Benet-Pierce – golden goosefoot
- Chenopodium auricomiforme Murr & Thell.
- Chenopodium auricomum Lindl. – Queensland bluebush
- Chenopodium ayare Toro Torr.
- Chenopodium baccatum Labill. (Syn. Rhagodia baccata)
- Chenopodium benthamii Iamonico & Mosyakin (Syn.: Rhagodia latifolia)
- Chenopodium berlandieri Moq. – pitseed goosefoot, southern huauzontle, lambsquarters
  - Chenopodium berlandieri var. berlandieri (synonym Chenopodium nuttalliae Saff.) – huauzontle, chia roja, quelit
- Chenopodium betaceum Andrz.
- Chenopodium × binzianum Aellen & Thell.
- Chenopodium × bohemicum F.Dvořák
- Chenopodium × borbasii Murr
- Chenopodium brandegeeae Benet-Pierce – Brandegee's goosefoot
- Chenopodium bryoniifolium Bunge – Korean goosefoot
- Chenopodium candolleanum (Moq.) S.Fuentes & Borsch (Syn.: Rhagodia candolleana)
- Chenopodium carnosulum Moq.
- Chenopodium chaldoranicum Rahimin. & Ghaemm.
- Chenopodium cordobense Aellen
- Chenopodium cornutum (Torr.) Benth. & Hook.f. ex S.Watson
- Chenopodium × covillei Aellen
- Chenopodium crusoeanum Skottsb.
- Chenopodium cuneifolium Vahl
- Chenopodium curvispicatum Paul G.Wilson
- Chenopodium cyanifolium Pandeya, Singhal & A.K.Bhatn.
- Chenopodium cycloides A.Nelson – sandhill goosefoot
- Chenopodium × dadakovae F.Dvořák
- Chenopodium desertorum (J.M.Black) J.M.Black – desert goosefoot
- Chenopodium desiccatum A.Nelson – narrowleaf goosefoot
- Chenopodium detestans Kirk – New Zealand fish-guts plant
- Chenopodium diversifolium (Aellen) F.Dvořák
- Chenopodium drummondii (Moq.) S.Fuentes & Borsch (Syn.: Rhagodia drummondii)
- Chenopodium eastwoodiae Benet-Pierce – Eastwood's goosefoot
- Chenopodium eremaeum (Paul G.Wilson) S.Fuentes & Borsch (Syn.: Rhagodia eremaea)
- Chenopodium erosum R.Br.
- Chenopodium eustriatum F.Dvořák
- Chenopodium × fallax (Aellen) F.Dvořák
- Chenopodium ficifoliiforme F.Dvořák
- Chenopodium ficifolium Sm. – fig-leaved goosefoot, small goosefoot
- Chenopodium flabellifolium Standl. – San Martin Island goosefoot, flabelliform goosefoot
- Chenopodium foggii Wahl – Fogg's goosefoot
- Chenopodium fremontii S.Watson – Fremont's goosefoot
- Chenopodium frutescens C.A.Mey.
- Chenopodium × fursajevii Aellen & Iljin
- Chenopodium gaudichaudianum (Moq.) Paul G.Wilson
- Chenopodium giganteum D.Don (synonym Chenopodium formosanum Koidz.) – tree spinach, red quinoa, djulis
- Chenopodium griseochlorinum F.Dvořák
- Chenopodium grubovii Lomon. & Uotila
- Chenopodium × gruellii Aellen
- Chenopodium harae Sukhor.
- Chenopodium hastatifolium Pandeya & A.Pandeya
- Chenopodium × haywardiae Murr
- Chenopodium hederiforme (Murr) Aellen
- Chenopodium hians Standl.
- Chenopodium hircinum Schrad.
- Chenopodium hoggarense Uotila & C.Chatel.
- Chenopodium howellii Benet-Pierce – Howell's goosefoot
- Chenopodium hubbardii Aellen
- Chenopodium × humiliforme (Murr) F.Dvořák
- Chenopodium iljinii Golosk.
- Chenopodium incanum (S.Watson) A.Heller – mealy goosefoot
- Chenopodium incognitum Wahl
- Chenopodium indicum T.K.Paul
- Chenopodium iranicum (Aellen) Hamdi & Malekloo
- Chenopodium × jedlickae F.Dvořák
- Chenopodium × jehlikii F.Dvořák
- Chenopodium karoi (Murr) Aellen
- Chenopodium khorasanica Hamdi & Malekloo
- Chenopodium lenticulare Aellen
- Chenopodium × leptophylliforme Aellen
- Chenopodium leptophyllum (Moq.) Nutt. ex S.Watson – narrowleaf goosefoot
- Chenopodium × linciense Murr
- Chenopodium lineatum Benet-Pierce – Mono goosefoot
- Chenopodium littoreum Benet-Pierce & M.G.Simpson – coastal goosefoot
- Chenopodium lobodontum H.Scholz
- Chenopodium loureiroi Steud.
- Chenopodium luteorubrum Mandák & Lomon.
- Chenopodium luteum Benet-Pierce – yellow goosefoot
- Chenopodium × mendelii F.Dvořák
- Chenopodium moquinianum Aellen
- Chenopodium mucronatum Thunb.
- Chenopodium neomexicanum Standl. – New Mexico goosefoot
- Chenopodium nesodendron Skottsb.
- Chenopodium nevadense Standl. – Nevada goosefoot
- Chenopodium nitens Benet-Pierce & M.G.Simpson
- Chenopodium nitrariaceum (F.Muell.) F.Muell. ex Benth. – nitre goosefoot
- Chenopodium nitens Benet-Pierce & M.G.Simpson – shiny goosefoot
- Chenopodium novopokrovskyanum (Aellen) Uotila
- Chenopodium nutans (R.Br.) S.Fuentes & Borsch (Syn.: Rhagodia nutans)
- Chenopodium oahuense (Meyen) Aellen – ʻĀheahea (Hawaiʻi)
- Chenopodium obscurum Aellen
- Chenopodium opulifolium Schrad. ex W.D.J.Koch & Ziz – grey goosefoot
- Chenopodium pallescens Standl. – pallid goosefoot
- Chenopodium pallidicaule Aellen – kañiwa, "cañahua"
- Chenopodium palmeri Standl. – Palmer's goosefoot
- Chenopodium pamiricum Iljin
- Chenopodium parabolicum (R.Br.) S.Fuentes & Borsch (Syn.: Rhagodia parabolica)
- Chenopodium × paradoxum Mandák
- Chenopodium parryi Standl. – Parry's goosefoot
- Chenopodium perttii Sukhor.
- Chenopodium petiolare Kunth
- Chenopodium philippianum Aellen
- Chenopodium phillipsianum Aellen
- Chenopodium pilcomayense Aellen
- Chenopodium × podperae F.Dvořák
- Chenopodium polygonoides (Murr) Aellen
- Chenopodium × praeacutum Murr
- Chenopodium pratericola Rydb. – pale goosefoot, desert goosefoot, narrowleaf goosefoot
- Chenopodium preissii (Moq.) Diels (Syn. Rhagodia preissii)
- Chenopodium × preissmannii Murr
- Chenopodium × pseudoleptophyllum Aellen
- Chenopodium × pseudostriatum (Zschacke) Druce
- Chenopodium pueblense H.S.Reed
- Chenopodium quinoa Willd. – quinoa
- Chenopodium × reynieri Ludw. & Aellen
- Chenopodium robertianum Iamonico & Mosyakin (Syn.: Rhagodia hastata)
- Chenopodium ruiz-lealii Aellen
- Chenopodium sanctae-clarae Johow
- Chenopodium sancti-ambrosii Skottsb.
- Chenopodium sandersii Benet-Pierce – Sander's goosefoot
- Chenopodium santoshei Pandeya, Singhal & A.K.Bhatn.
- Chenopodium scabricaule Speg.
- Chenopodium simpsonii Benet-Pierce – Simpson's goosefoot
- Chenopodium × smardae F.Dvořák
- Chenopodium sonorense Benet-Pierce & M.G.Simpson – Sonoran goosefoot
- Chenopodium sosnowskyi Kapeller
- Chenopodium spegazzinii F.Dvořák
- Chenopodium spinescens (R.Br.) S.Fuentes & Borsch (Syn. Rhagodia spinescens)
- Chenopodium standleyanum Aellen – Standley's goosefoot
- Chenopodium stenophyllum (Makino) Koidz.
- Chenopodium striatiforme Murr
- Chenopodium subficifolium (Murr) Druce
- Chenopodium subglabrum (S.Watson) A.Nelson – smooth arid goosefoot, smooth goosefoot
- Chenopodium suecicum Murr – green goosefoot
- Chenopodium × thellungii Murr
- Chenopodium tonkinense Courchet
- Chenopodium triandrum G.Forst. (Syn.: Rhagodia triandra)
- Chenopodium × tridentinum Murr
- Chenopodium × trigonocarpum Aellen
- Chenopodium trigonon Schult. (Syn.: Einadia trigonos)
- Chenopodium twisselmannii Benet-Pierce – Twisselmann's goosefoot, high meadow goosefoot
- Chenopodium ulbrichii Aellen
- Chenopodium ulicinum Gand.
- Chenopodium × unarii F.Dvořák
- Chenopodium × variabile Aellen (C. album × C. berlandieri)
- Chenopodium vulvaria L. – stinking goosefoot, notchweed
- Chenopodium wahlii Benet-Pierce – Wahl's goosefoot
- Chenopodium watsonii A.Nelson – Watson's goosefoot
- Chenopodium wilsonii S.Fuentes, Borsch & Uotila (Syn.: Rhagodia crassifolia)
- Chenopodium × zahnii Murr
- Chenopodium zerovii Iljin
- Chenopodium zoellneri Aellen

=== Excluded species ===
- Blitum (12 species):
  - Blitum bonus-henricus – Good King Henry, perennial goosefoot, poor-man's asparagus, Lincolnshire spinach, markery
  - Blitum californicum – California goosefoot, Indian lettuce
  - Blitum capitatum – strawberry blite, blite goosefoot, strawberry goosefoot, strawberry spinach, Indian paint, Indian ink
  - Blitum virgatum (Syn. Chenopodium foliosum) – leafy goosefoot
- Chenopodiastrum (5 species):
  - Chenopodiastrum murale – nettle-leaved goosefoot
  - Chenopodiastrum simplex – giant seed goosefoot
- Dysphania (about 43 glandular species, as C. botrys, C. carinatum, C. cristatum, C. melanocarpum, C. multifidium, C. pumilio and more)
- Lipandra (one species):
  - Lipandra polysperma – many-seeded goosefoot
- Oxybasis (5 species):
  - Oxybasis chenopodioides – small red goosefoot, saltmarsh goosefoot
  - Oxybasis glauca – oak-leaved goosefoot
  - Oxybasis rubra – red goosefoot, coastblite goosefoot
  - Oxybasis urbica – upright goosefoot
- Teloxys (one species):
  - Teloxys aristata
- Suaeda australis – austral seablite (as C. australe, C. insulare)

== Ecology ==
Certain species grow in large thickets, providing cover for small animals. Goosefoot foliage is used as food by the caterpillars of certain Lepidoptera. The seeds are eaten by many birds, such as the yellowhammer (Emberiza citrinella) of Europe or the white-winged fairy-wren (Malurus leucopterus) of Australia. Goosefoot pathogens include the positive-sense ssRNA viruses – apple stem grooving virus, sowbane mosaic virus and tobacco necrosis virus.

== Uses ==
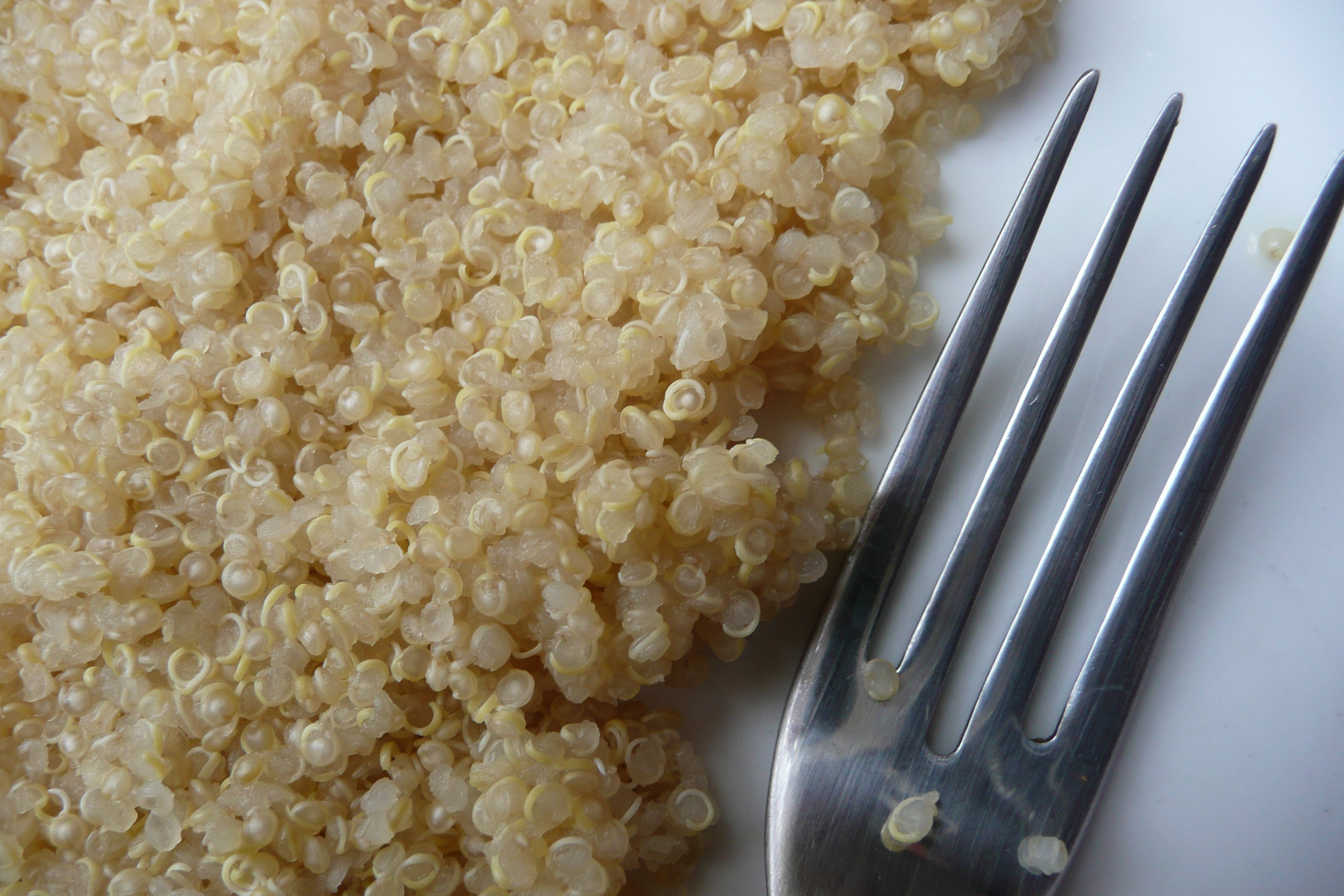
Cooked quinoa (C. quinoa) seeds

The genus Chenopodium contains several plants of minor to moderate importance as food crops as leaf vegetables – used like the closely related spinach (Spinacia oleracea) and similar plants called quelite in Mexico – and pseudocereals. These include white goosefoot (C. album), kañiwa (C. pallidicaule) and quinoa (C. quinoa). On the Greek island of Crete, tender shoots and leaves of a species called krouvida (κρουβίδα) or psarovlito (ψαρόβλητο) are eaten by the locals, boiled or steamed. As studied by Bruce D. Smith, Kristen Gremillion and others, goosefoots have a history of culinary use dating back to 4000 BC or earlier, when pitseed goosefoot (C. berlandieri) was a staple crop in the Native American Eastern Agricultural Complex, and when white goosefoot was apparently used by the Ertebølle culture of Europe. Members of the eastern European Yamnaya culture also harvested white goosefoot as an apparent cereal substitute to round out an otherwise mostly meat and dairy diet c. 3500–2500 BC.

There is increased interest in particular in goosefoot seeds today, which are suitable as part of a gluten-free diet. Quinoa oil, extracted from the seeds of C. quinoa, has similar properties, but is superior in quality, to corn oil. Oil of chenopodium is extracted from the seeds of epazote, which is not in this genus anymore. Shagreen leather was produced in the past using the small, hard goosefoot seeds. C. album was one of the main model organisms for the molecular biological study of chlorophyllase.

Goosefoot pollen, in particular of the widespread and usually abundant C. album, is an allergen to many people and a common cause of hay fever. The same species, as well as some others, have seeds which are able to persist for years in the soil seed bank. Many goosefoot species are thus significant weeds, and some have become invasive species.

According to the 1889 book The Useful Native Plants of Australia, the species Chenopodium auricomum is "another of the salt-bushes, which, besides being invaluable food for stock, can be eaten by man. All plants of the Natural Order Chenopodiaceae (Salsolacese) are more or less useful in this respect." The book goes on to give the following account from the Journal de la Ferme et des Maisons de campagne:

We have recently gathered an abundant harvest of leaves from two or three plants growing in our garden. These leaves were put into boiling water to blanch them, and they were then cooked as an ordinary dish of spinach, with this difference in favour of the new plant, that there was no occasion to take away the threads which are so disagreeable in chicory, sorrel, and ordinary spinach. We partook of this dish with relish—the flavour—analogous to spinach, had something in it more refined, less grassy in taste. The cultivation is easy: sow the seed in April (October) in a well-manured bed, for the plant is greedy; water it. The leaves may be gathered from the time the plant attains 50 centimetres (say 20 inches) in height. They grow up again quickly. In less than eight days afterwards another gathering may take place, and so on to the end of the year.

=== Safety ===
Sphaeraphides occur in the leaves, stem, pith and mesophloem.

== Fossil record ==
†Chenopodium wetzleri fossil seeds of the Chattian stage, Oligocene, are known from the Oberleichtersbach Formation in the Rhön Mountains, central Germany.

== Bibliography ==
- Gulliver, George (1864). "Observations on Raphides and other Crystals". The Annals and Magazine of Natural History, Including Zoology, Botany, and Geology. Third Series. 14: 250–252.
