= Meade Island =

Island in Western Australia

- Location within Western Australia

Geography
- Location: Indian Ocean
- Coordinates: 26°S 113.2°E

Administration
- Australia
- State: Western Australia

Mead Island is an uninhabited sand island located about 200 metres (660 ft) from Dirk Hartog Island in the Shark Bay World Heritage Site in Western Australia, and joined to that island at low tide. It has an area of about 800 square metres (8,600 sq ft), and an elevation of 2 metres (6 ft 7 in).

The island's vegetation is a closed heath, of which the dominant plant species are Nitraria billardierei (Nitre Bush), Scaevola crassifolia (Thick-leaved Fan-flower) and Spinifex longifolius (Beach Spinifex). Other plant species include Exocarpos aphyllus (Leafless Ballart), Rhagodia preissii subsp. obovata, Salsola tragus (Prickly Saltwort), Sonchus oleraceus (Common Sow-thistle), and a species of Pelargonium. Eight species of seabird roost on the island.

== See also ==
- List of islands of Western Australia
