= Chenopodium standleyanum =

Conservation status
- Secure (NatureServe)

Scientific classification
- Kingdom: Plantae
- Clade: Tracheophytes
- Clade: Angiosperms
- Clade: Eudicots
- Order: Caryophyllales
- Family: Amaranthaceae
- Genus: Chenopodium
- Species: C. standleyanum

Binomial name
- Chenopodium standleyanum Aellen

Synonyms
- Chenopodium acutifolium Kit. ex Schult.; Chenopodium polyspermum var. spicatum Klett & Richt.; Chenopodium polyspermum subsp. spicatum (Klett & Richt.) Arcang.; Chenopodium gigantospermum var. standleyanum Aellen; Chenopodium hybridum var. standleyanum (Aellen) Fernald

Species of flowering plant

Chenopodium standleyanum, commonly known as woodland goosefoot or standley's goosefoot, is a species of herbaceous flowering plant in the family Amaranthaceae. It can be distinguished from others of the genus Chenopodium by its delicate branching habit, easily detachable pericarp, and sepals that lightly curl over the margins of the mature fruit. The plant is native to the eastern half of North America, where it is commonly found in wooded environments.

== Description ==
The plant ranges from 20–60 cm (7.9–23.6 in) in height and is hairless on its stem. The leaves are 2–4.5 cm (0.79–1.77 in) in length and 0.5–1.5 cm (0.20–0.59 in) in width, with petioles that are 0.5–2.5 cm (0.20–0.98 in) in length. They have a oblong–ovoid to lanceolate shape with a cuneate base and feature a few teeth on the margins of the base part of the leaf.

The flowers are either single or tightly packed in a small cluster and are located at the tips of stems branching from the upper leaf axils.

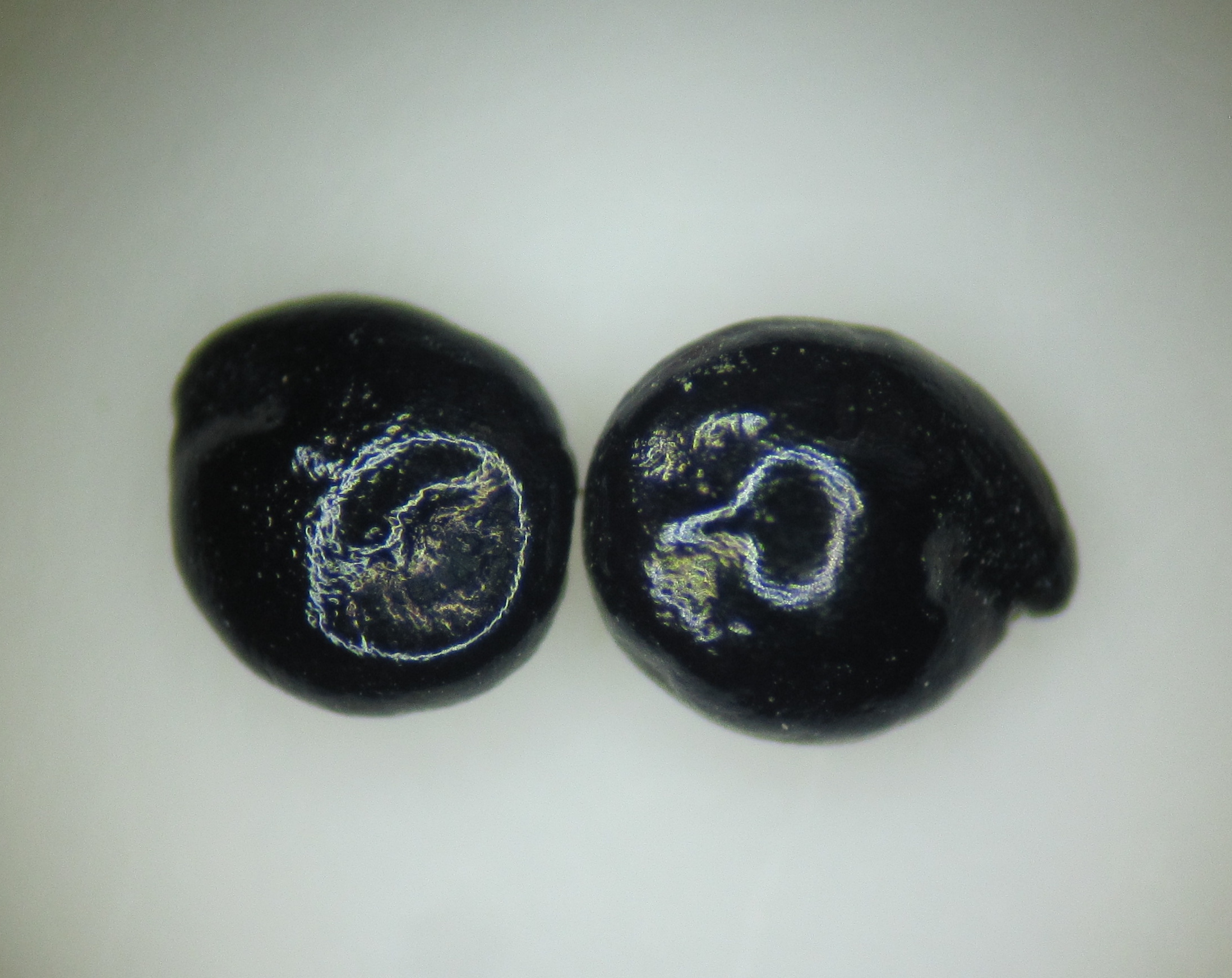
Seeds

The seeds are lens shaped with a smooth to honeycombed texture and a deep black color. They are between 0.9–1.3 mm (0.035–0.051 in) in diameter.

== Distribution and habitat ==
The species is commonly found in shaded woods with disturbed soil and populates the eastern United States and the Canadian province of Ontario.

== Taxonomy ==
The species name, standleyanum, is an homage to botanist Paul Carpenter Standley.
