= Chenopodium strictum =

Scientific classification
- Kingdom: Plantae
- Clade: Tracheophytes
- Clade: Angiosperms
- Clade: Eudicots
- Order: Caryophyllales
- Family: Amaranthaceae
- Genus: Chenopodium
- Species: C. strictum

Binomial name
- Chenopodium strictum Roth

Synonyms
- Chenopodium album subsp. striatum

Species of plant

Chenopodium strictum, the lateflowering goosefoot, is a species of annual herb in the family Amaranthaceae (pigweed). It have a self-supporting growth form and simple, broad leaves. Individuals can grow to 55 cm tall.

== Sources ==
This article incorporates text from a free content work. Licensed under CC0 (license statement/permission). Text taken from Chenopodium strictum. Encyclopedia of Life.
