= Chenopodium desertorum =

Scientific classification
- Kingdom: Plantae
- Clade: Tracheophytes
- Clade: Angiosperms
- Clade: Eudicots
- Order: Caryophyllales
- Family: Amaranthaceae
- Genus: Chenopodium
- Species: C. desertorum

Binomial name
- Chenopodium desertorum (J.M.Black) J.M.Black
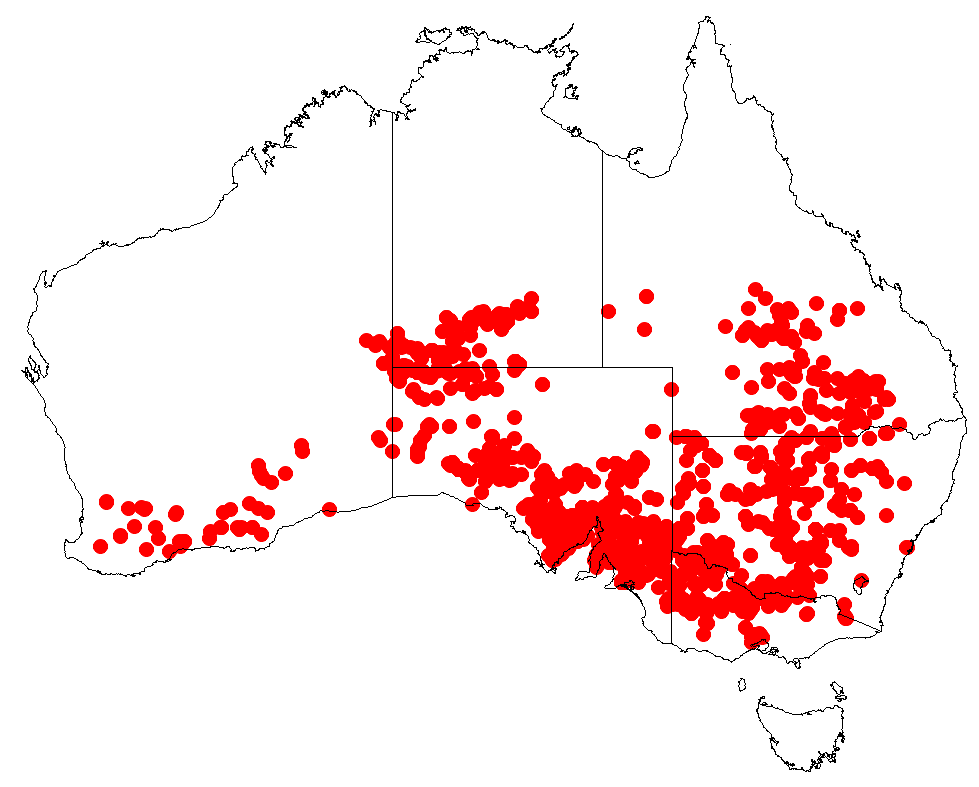
- Occurrence data from the Australasian Virtual Herbarium

Synonyms
- Chenopodium microphyllum var. desertorum J.M.Black

Species of flowering plant

Chenopodium desertorum, common name frosted goosefruit, is a species of flowering plant in the family Amaranthaceae, indigenous to Australia where it is found in all mainland states.

== Taxonomy ==
It was first described by John McConnell Black as Chenopodium microphyllum var. desertorum, but in 1924 he redescribed it as Chenopodium desertorum.

Several subspecies are accepted:

- Chenopodium desertorum subsp. desertorum
- Chenopodium desertorum subsp. anidiophyllum (Aellen) Paul G.Wilson
- Chenopodium desertorum subsp. microphyllum Paul G.Wilson
- Chenopodium desertorum subsp. rectum Paul G.Wilson
- Chenopodium desertorum subsp. virosum Paul G.Wilson
