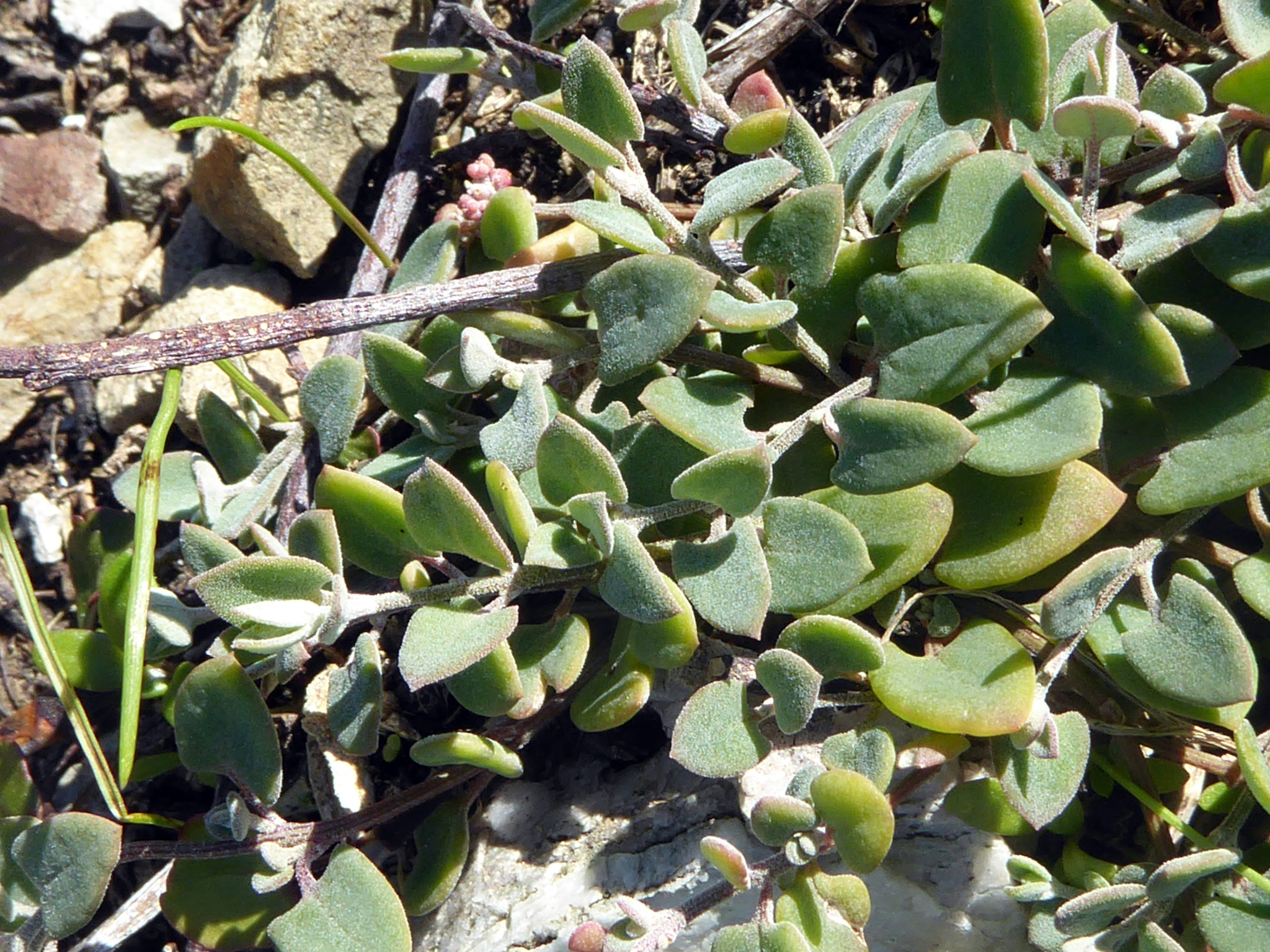
- Chenopodium triandrum in Kapiti Island

Conservation status
- Not Threatened (NZ TCS)

Scientific classification
- Kingdom: Plantae
- Clade: Tracheophytes
- Clade: Angiosperms
- Clade: Eudicots
- Order: Caryophyllales
- Family: Amaranthaceae
- Genus: Chenopodium
- Species: C. triandrum

Binomial name
- Chenopodium triandrum G.Forst.

= Chenopodium triandrum =

Species of flowering plant

Chenopodium triandrum or pigweed is a species of flowering plant, endemic to New Zealand.

== Description ==
C. triandrum is a perennial low-growing prostrate shrub. This plant exhibits trioecy and has berries spread via frugivory.

== Distribution ==
C. triandrum is found on New Zealand's main islands, as well as the Kermadec Islands and the Chatham Islands.
