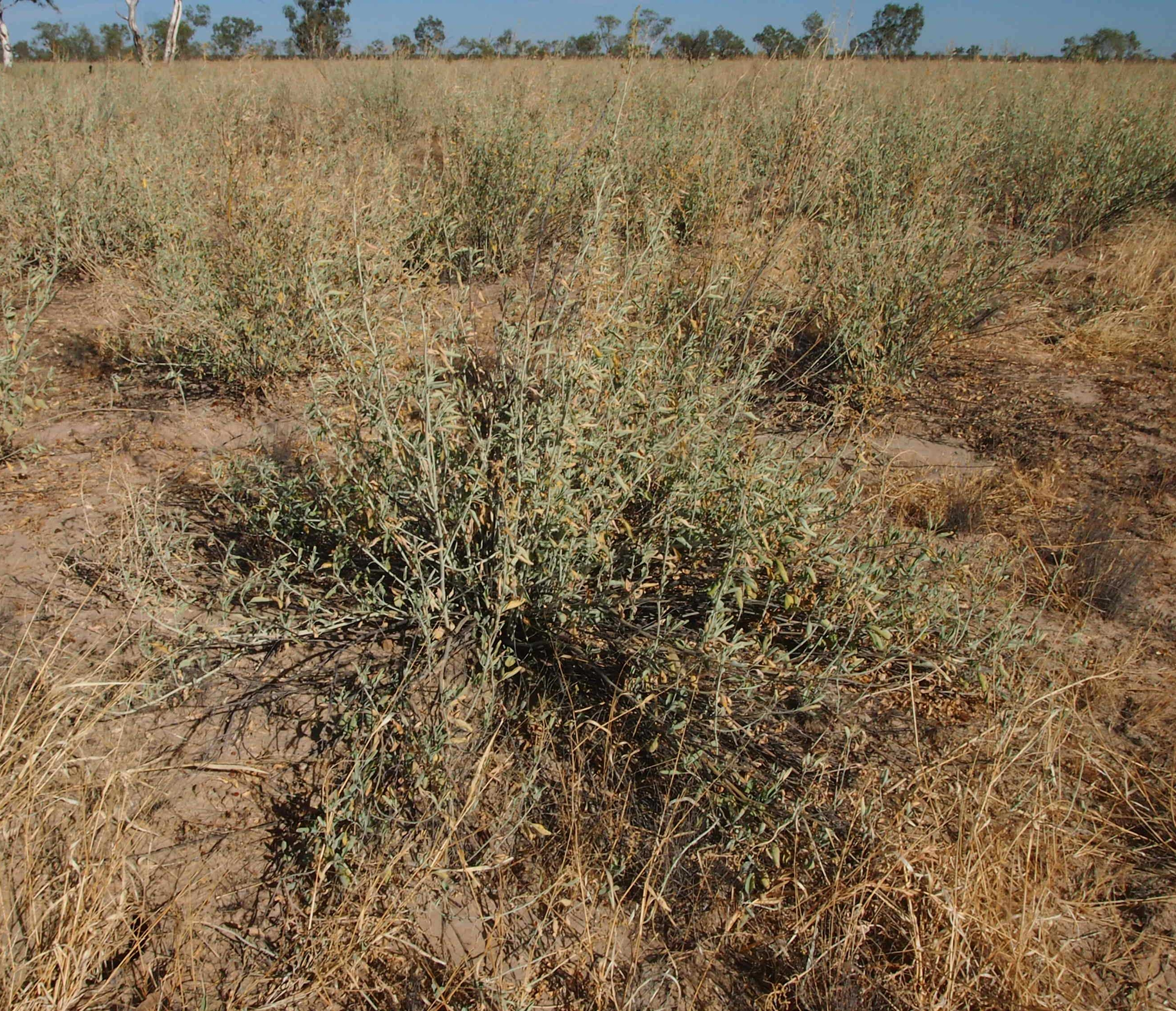
- Habit
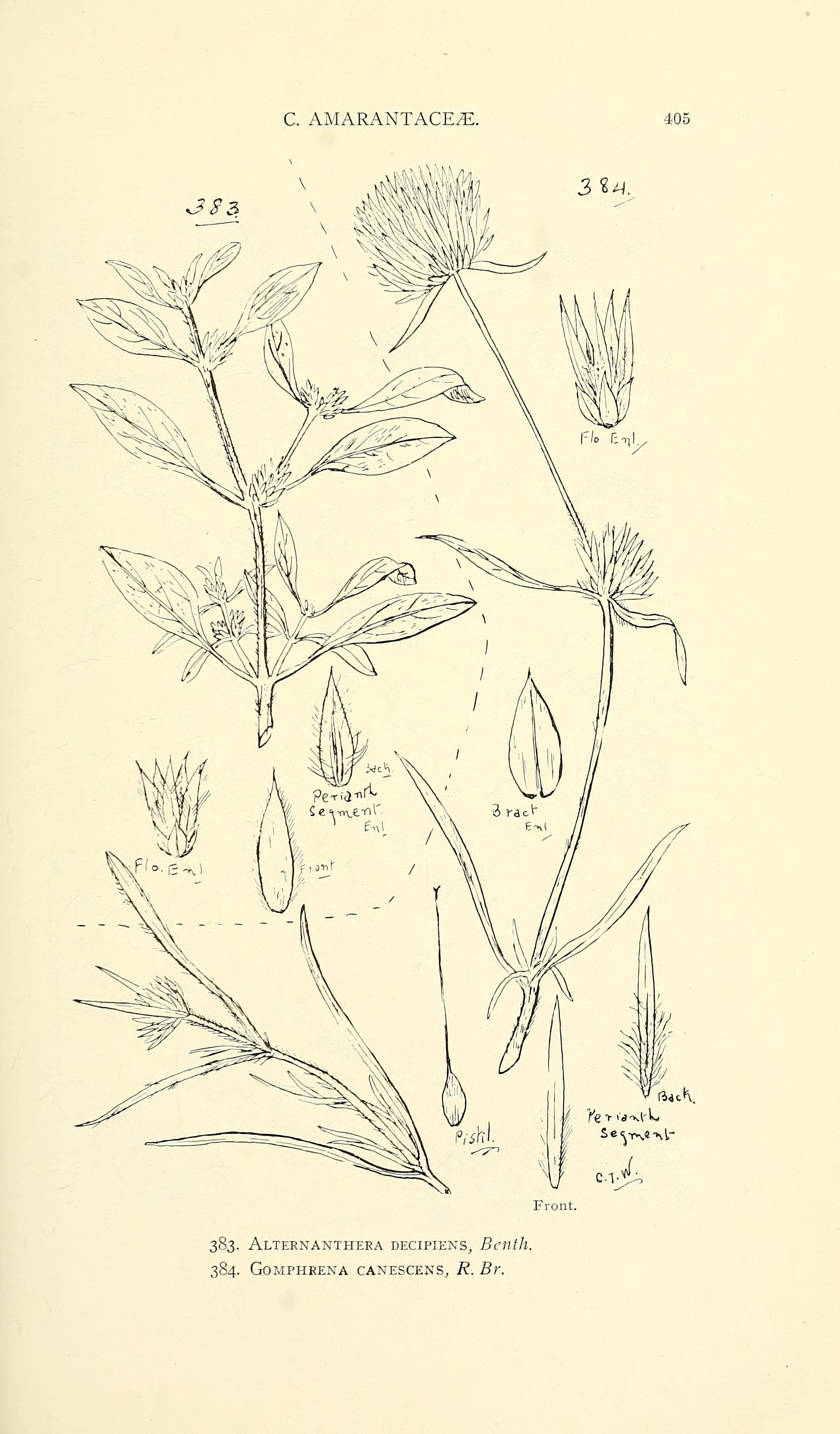
- Botanical illustration

Scientific classification
- Kingdom: Plantae
- Clade: Tracheophytes
- Clade: Angiosperms
- Clade: Eudicots
- Order: Caryophyllales
- Family: Amaranthaceae
- Genus: Chenopodium
- Species: C. auricomum

Binomial name
- Chenopodium auricomum Lindl.

Synonyms
- Chenopodium auricomum f. subglabrum Aellen

= Chenopodium auricomum =

Species of plant in the amaranth family

Chenopodium auricomum, the Queensland bluebush, is a species of flowering plant in the family Amaranthaceae, native to Australia (except Victoria and Tasmania). It is a specialist on heavy soils that are periodically waterlogged.
