= Chenopodium foggii =

Conservation status
- Imperiled (NatureServe)

Scientific classification
- Kingdom: Plantae
- Clade: Tracheophytes
- Clade: Angiosperms
- Clade: Eudicots
- Order: Caryophyllales
- Family: Amaranthaceae
- Genus: Chenopodium
- Species: C. foggii

Binomial name
- Chenopodium foggii Wahl

Species of flowering plant in the goosefoot family

Chenopodium foggii, commonly known as Fogg's goosefoot, is a species of annual herb found throughout eastern North America and particularly New England.

== Description ==
Chenopodium foggii is characterized by its predominantly narrow to ovate leaf blades and keeled sepals. An annual herb that forms a thick taproot, it has black, lustrous seeds. It flowers from August to October. Its average height ranges between 80 and 100 cm.

Identification of Chenopodium foggii can be difficult. Chenopodium foggii is closely related to the western species Chenopodium pratericola, although C. pratericola has thicker and narrower leaves than C. foggii. It also resembles Chenopodium album, although its fruits are more oval-shaped than C. album. These species, as well as other Chenopodium species such as Berlandier's goosefoot (Chenopodium berlandieri) and maple-leaved goosefoot (Chenopodiastrum simplex), are often found in the same sites as Chenopodium foggii. Goosefoot species co-occurrence presents challenges for surveying and population measurement.

== Ecology ==
=== Habitat ===
Chenopodium foggii is frequently found in rocky outcrops, sparsely wooded slopes, and cliff bases. It has been found in sandy, gravelly soil, particularly in Maine and New Hampshire. Recent research have found a strong association between Fogg's goosefoot and eastern red cedar in woodlands in Vermont; populations were found frequently growing around the bases of eastern red cedars or on ledges under slight overhangs. Instead of sandy, gravelly soil, the populations were found in areas where the ground was composed of layers of partially or undecomposed red cedar litter and a highly decomposed, black humic soil below.

== Conservation ==
The species was first collected in New England in the 1920s. Since then, it was considered extirpated, as local populations were no longer found. It was only rediscovered in the 1990s.

In 2015, the Maine Natural Areas Program listed Chenopodium foggii as threatened; in New Hampshire, the species is listed as endangered.
