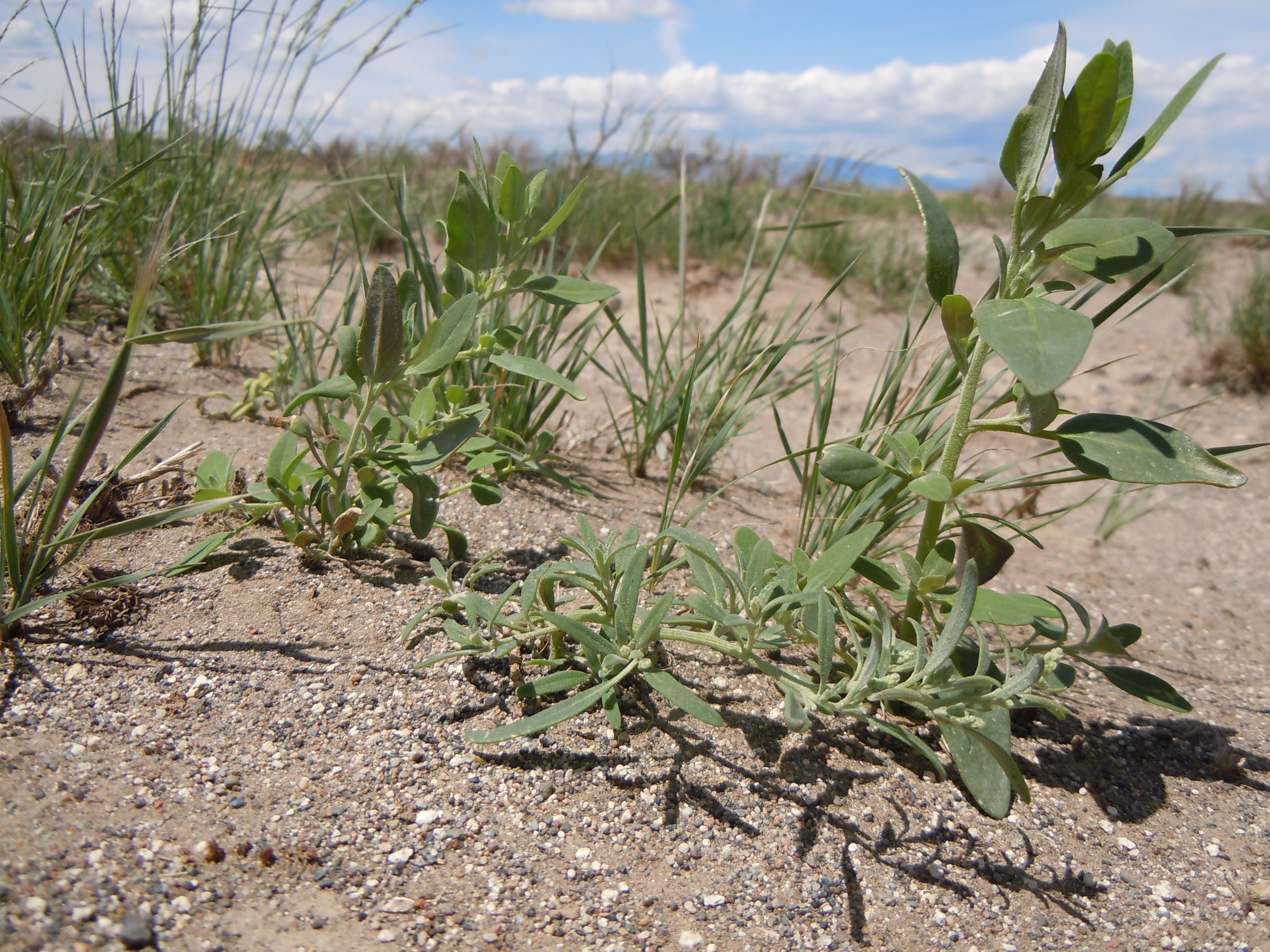

Conservation status
- Secure (NatureServe)

Scientific classification
- Kingdom: Plantae
- Clade: Tracheophytes
- Clade: Angiosperms
- Clade: Eudicots
- Order: Caryophyllales
- Family: Amaranthaceae
- Genus: Chenopodium
- Species: C. leptophyllum

Binomial name
- Chenopodium leptophyllum (Moq.) Nutt. ex S.Wats.

= Chenopodium leptophyllum =

Species of flowering plant

Chenopodium leptophyllum is a species of flowering plant in the family Amaranthaceae known by the common name narrowleaf goosefoot.

It is native to much of western North America, where it is reported from Alaska to Texas and northern Mexico, and into central Canada. It can be found in many types of open habitats, often in sandy and gravelly soils, and it grows easily in disturbed areas such as roadsides.

== Description ==
It is an erect or mostly erect annual herb approaching 40 to 60 centimeters in maximum height. It is powdery in texture, especially on the undersides of the leaves. The thin, dusty leaf is linear to narrowly lance-shaped, smooth along the edges, and up to about 2.5 centimeters in length.

The inflorescences are located at the tips of branches and in the leaf axils. They are arrays of clusters of tightly packed, tiny flowers. Each flower has five lobes in its corolla.

== Uses ==
Among the Zuni people, the young plants boiled alone or with meat and used for food. The ground seeds are mixed with corn meal and salt, made into a stiff batter, formed into balls and steamed. The seeds are to be considered among the most important food plants when the Zuni reached this world.
