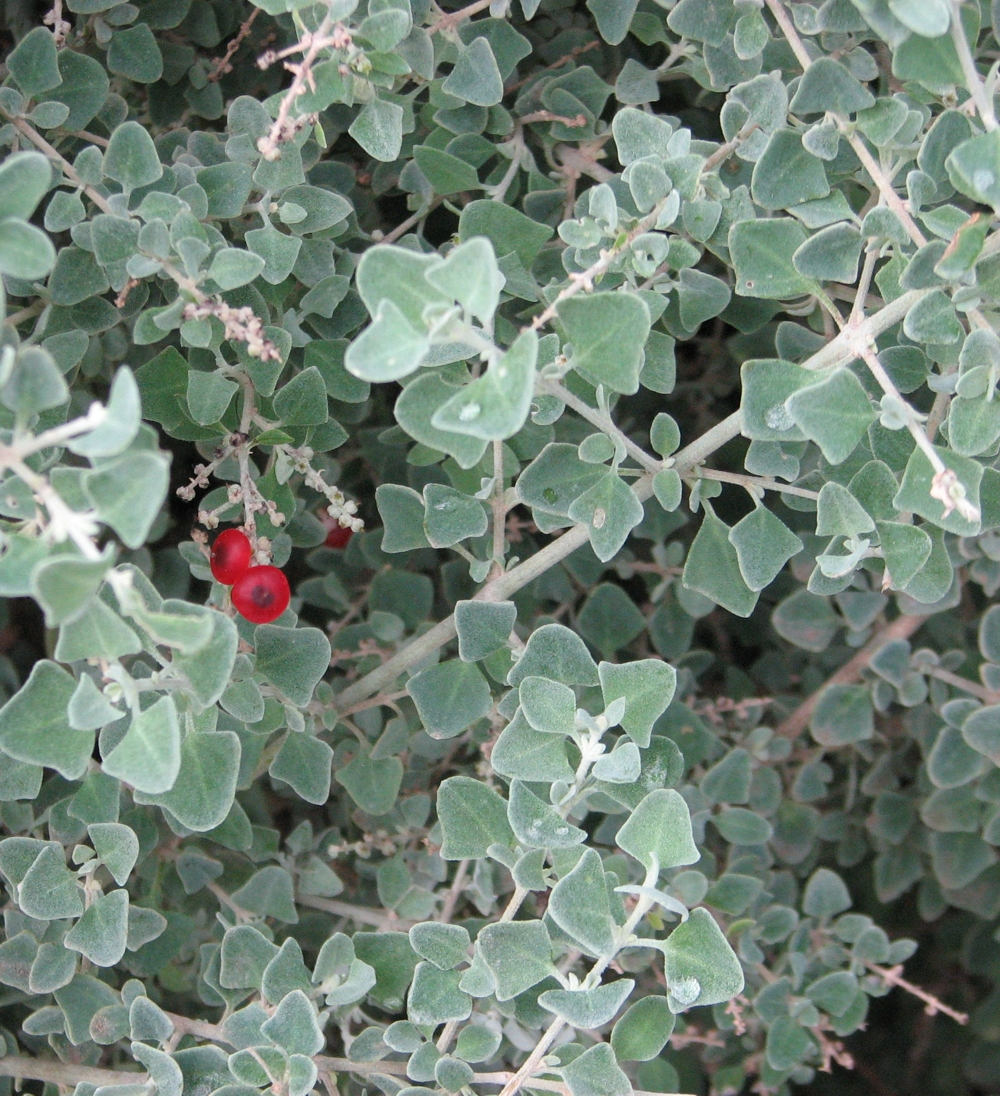

Scientific classification
- Kingdom: Plantae
- Clade: Tracheophytes
- Clade: Angiosperms
- Clade: Eudicots
- Order: Caryophyllales
- Family: Amaranthaceae
- Genus: Chenopodium
- Species: C. curvispicatum

Binomial name
- Chenopodium curvispicatum Paul G. Wilson

= Chenopodium curvispicatum =

Species of plant

Chenopodium curvispicatum is a species of plant in the family Amaranthaceae, endemic to Australia.

It is a small Australian native shrub species of Chenopodium genus, which occurs in semi-arid and arid areas of Western Australia, South Australia, Victoria and New South Wales. It is often referred to as cottony saltbush.

== Etymology and naming ==
The word curvispicatum is in reference to the shape of the panicles, which appear as drooping spikes. Common names include cottony saltbush, and cottony goosefoot. The species is often erroneously referred to in literature as Cheopodium gaudichaudianum, and also in hiberia as C. desertorum and Rghagodia spinescenus.

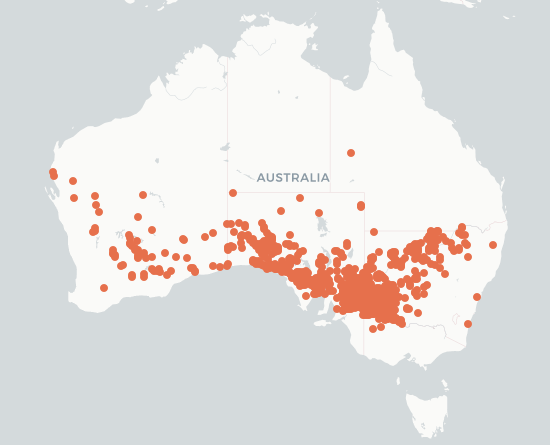
Collections data for Chenopodium curvispicatum from the Atlas of Living Australia

== Description ==
Chenopodium curvispicatum grows to 1m high in the form of a straggly shrub, and features slender drooping branches with dense vesicular hairs. The leaves are opposite or sub-opposite, with deltoid shaping profiles and are 1 to 1.5 cm long and wide, and are covered with white rounded hairs which appear as a silverly layer. The flowers are either male or bisexual with pyramidal panicles 2–5 cm long. The female flowers are found below the male, and the fruit is enveloping until mature when it opens to 5mm diameter and becoming red. The fruit is a berry which contains sap, and changes from red to orange as it dries.

== Taxonomy ==
Chenopodium curvispicatum is a member of the Caryophyllales order, within the Chenopodiaceae family.

== Ecology ==
Chenopodium curvispicatum is found in well drained calcareous limestone soils within semi-arid and sand plain woodlands. Many of these areas have become degraded due to overgrazing, as well as being impacted by feral species including goats and rabbits. Chenopodium family plants form key understorey components of plant communities. In these arid environments, understorey shrubs provide valuable habitat and resources for many species of herbs and grasses.

A typical plant community type featuring common associations with Chenopodium curvispicatum is the Casuarina pauper/Alectryon oleifolius woodland and Eucalyptus shrublands in semi-arid areas within Nanya Station in western New South Wales. These ecological communities form unique examples of intact vegetation communities rarely found in New South Wales.

== Reproduction/dispersal ==
The seeds are rounded at 1.5mm diameter, with a honeycomb matrix and are black in colour. The seeds disperse from fruiting flowers between March and September.
