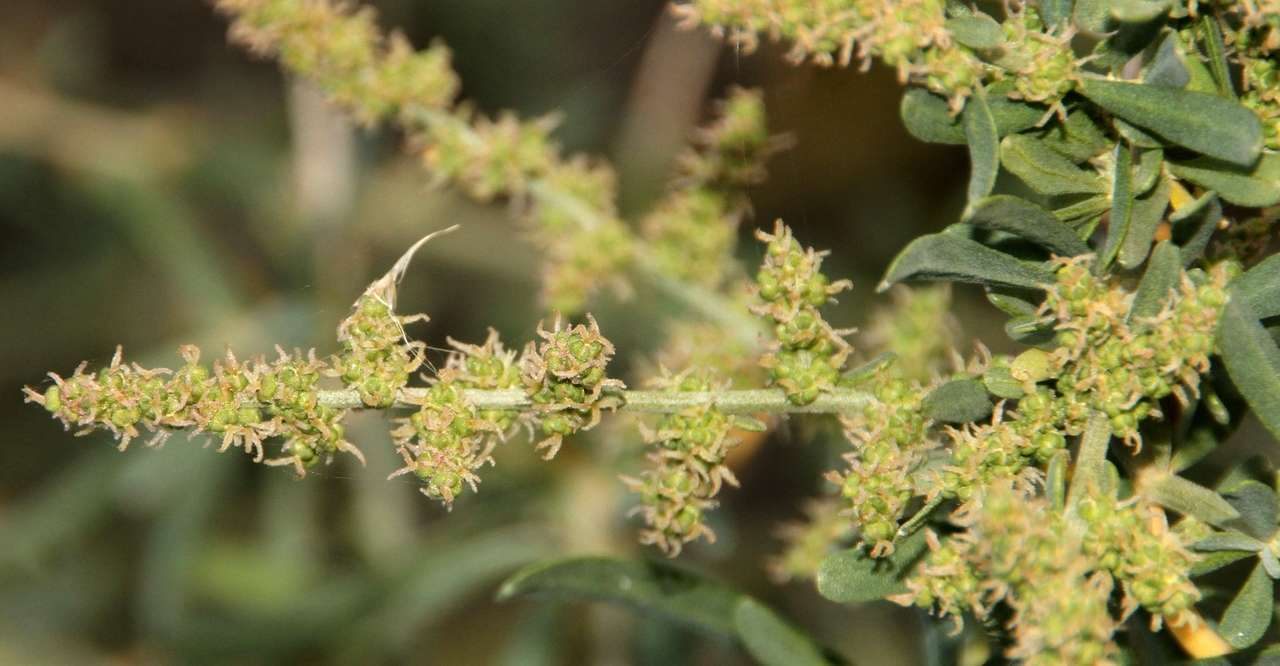

Scientific classification
- Kingdom: Plantae
- Clade: Tracheophytes
- Clade: Angiosperms
- Clade: Eudicots
- Order: Caryophyllales
- Family: Amaranthaceae
- Genus: Chenopodium
- Species: C. nitrariaceum

Binomial name
- Chenopodium nitrariaceum (F.Muell.) F.Muell. ex Benth.

= Chenopodium nitrariaceum =

Nitre goosefoot

Species of plant

Chenopodium nitrariaceum commonly known as the nitre goosefoot, is a flowering shrub in the family Amaranthaceae and is endemic to Australia. It is a spiny perennial with greyish leaves and small flowers.

== Description ==
Chenopodium nitrariaceum is a perennial shrub to about 2 m (6 ft 7 in) high with spiky branches The leaves are arranged alternately, greyish-green, sometimes clustered, spoon-shaped to linear, 5–25 mm (0.20–0.98 in) long, mostly to 5 mm (0.20 in) wide and occasional hairs and tapering to a short peduncle. Small flowers are borne in terminal clusters, 5 lobed, 1.5–2 mm (0.059–0.079 in) in diameter. Flowering may occur any time during the year and the fruit is a small pericarp, dry and white.

== Taxonomy and naming ==
This species was described in 1857 by Ferdinand von Mueller, who gave it the name Rhagodia nitrariacea. In 1870 George Bentham changed the name to Chenopodium nitrariaceum in his Flora Australiensis from an unpublished manuscript by Ferdinand von Mueller. The specific epithet (nitrariaceum) means 'resembling Nitraria'.

== Distribution and habitat ==
Nitre goosefoot grows on clay, clay-loam, stony situations on flood plains, wetter areas and sand plains in New South Wales, Queensland, Victoria, South Australia and the Northern Territory.
