= Chenopodium fremontii =

Conservation status
- Secure (NatureServe)

Scientific classification
- Kingdom: Plantae
- Clade: Tracheophytes
- Clade: Angiosperms
- Clade: Eudicots
- Order: Caryophyllales
- Family: Amaranthaceae
- Genus: Chenopodium
- Species: C. fremontii

Binomial name
- Chenopodium fremontii S.Wats.

Species of flowering plant

Chenopodium fremontii is a species of flowering plant in the family Amaranthaceae known by the common name Frémont's goosefoot. Both the species' specific epithet, and the common name derive from the 19th century western pioneer John C. Frémont.

It is native to much of the western half of North America from Canada through California to Mexico. It grows in many types of habitat from open desert, to shady forest, at 700–3,100 metres (2,300–10,200 ft).

== Description ==
Chenopodium fremontii is an annual herb growing an erect stem up to 50 to 80 centimeters in maximum height. It is powdery in texture, especially on the leaves and flowers. The leaves are up to 4 centimeters long, oval to triangular, and generally with a few lobes.

The inflorescence is a spike of several clusters of tightly-packed tiny flowers. Each flower has five lobes and coats the developing fruit. It flowers from June to October.

== Uses ==
Many Native American tribes utilize this plant for food, the greens as a vegetable and the seeds as grain for bread and porridge.
