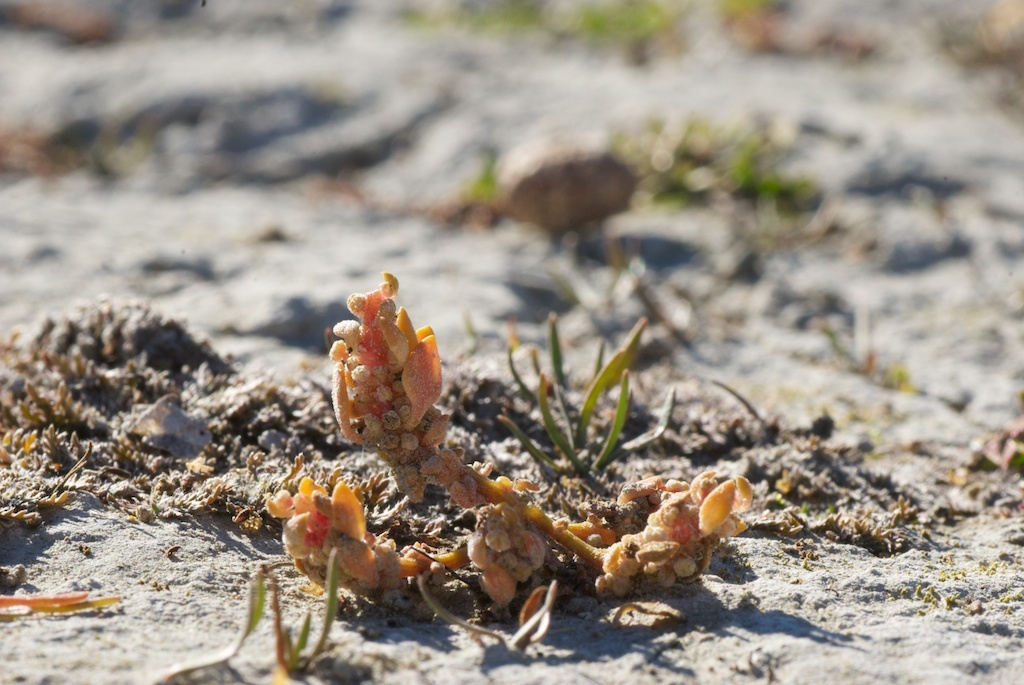

Scientific classification
- Kingdom: Plantae
- Clade: Tracheophytes
- Clade: Angiosperms
- Clade: Eudicots
- Order: Caryophyllales
- Family: Amaranthaceae
- Genus: Chenopodium
- Species: C. detestans

Binomial name
- Chenopodium detestans Kirk

= Chenopodium detestans =

Species of flowering plant

Chenopodium detestans, commonly known as the New Zealand fish-guts plant, is an endangered species of flowering plant in the family Amaranthaceae. It is native to New Zealand's South Island.
