= Chenopodium formosanum =

Scientific classification
- Kingdom: Plantae
- Clade: Tracheophytes
- Clade: Angiosperms
- Clade: Eudicots
- Order: Caryophyllales
- Family: Amaranthaceae
- Genus: Chenopodium
- Species: C. formosanum

Binomial name
- Chenopodium formosanum Koidz.

Species of flowering plant

Chenopodium formosanum is a Chenopodium species endemic to Taiwan. It was a key component of the diets of Taiwanese indigenous peoples and remains culturally and culinarily significant.

== Common names ==
Chenopodium formosanum is known as djulis in the Paiwan language, mukun in Bunun language, ba'e in Rukai language, and duli in Puyuma language, and kowal in Amis language. The Chinese common name 紅藜 (Pinyin: hónglí, literally "red goosefoot") was coined by plant taxonomist 林志忠 Lín Zhìzhōng who has worked with Taiwanese Indigenous communities for decades to revitalize traditional Indigenous crops and agriculture systems. To gain academic support for this restoration work, 林志忠 Lín Zhìzhōng worked with research teams from Pingtung University of Science and Technology, National Sun Yat-sen University and National Kaohsiung University, to establish 紅藜 as an academically recognized common name.

Chenopodium formosanum is also known as red quinoa. Note that the name "red goosefoot" is also used for the related species Oxybasis rubra. It is also known as "rainbow rice" due to its stripes.

== Description ==
Chenopodium formosanum is a cereal. It has a high fiber and protein content.

== History ==
Chenopodium formosanum was a key component of the diets of Formosan indigenous peoples, but because it is not a staple food or economic crop, instead traditionally used to make millet wine, it had largely disappeared from cultivation by the 2000s. Renewed interest in traditional foodstuffs has led to a revival of production with cultivation in Taitung County expanding from 40 hectares in 2015 to 200 hectares in 2018. This rapid expansion quickly glutted the market and surplus produce had to be stored.

Chenopodium formosanum is part of the Slow Food Foundation for Biodiversity's Ark of Taste.

== See also ==
- Quinoa
