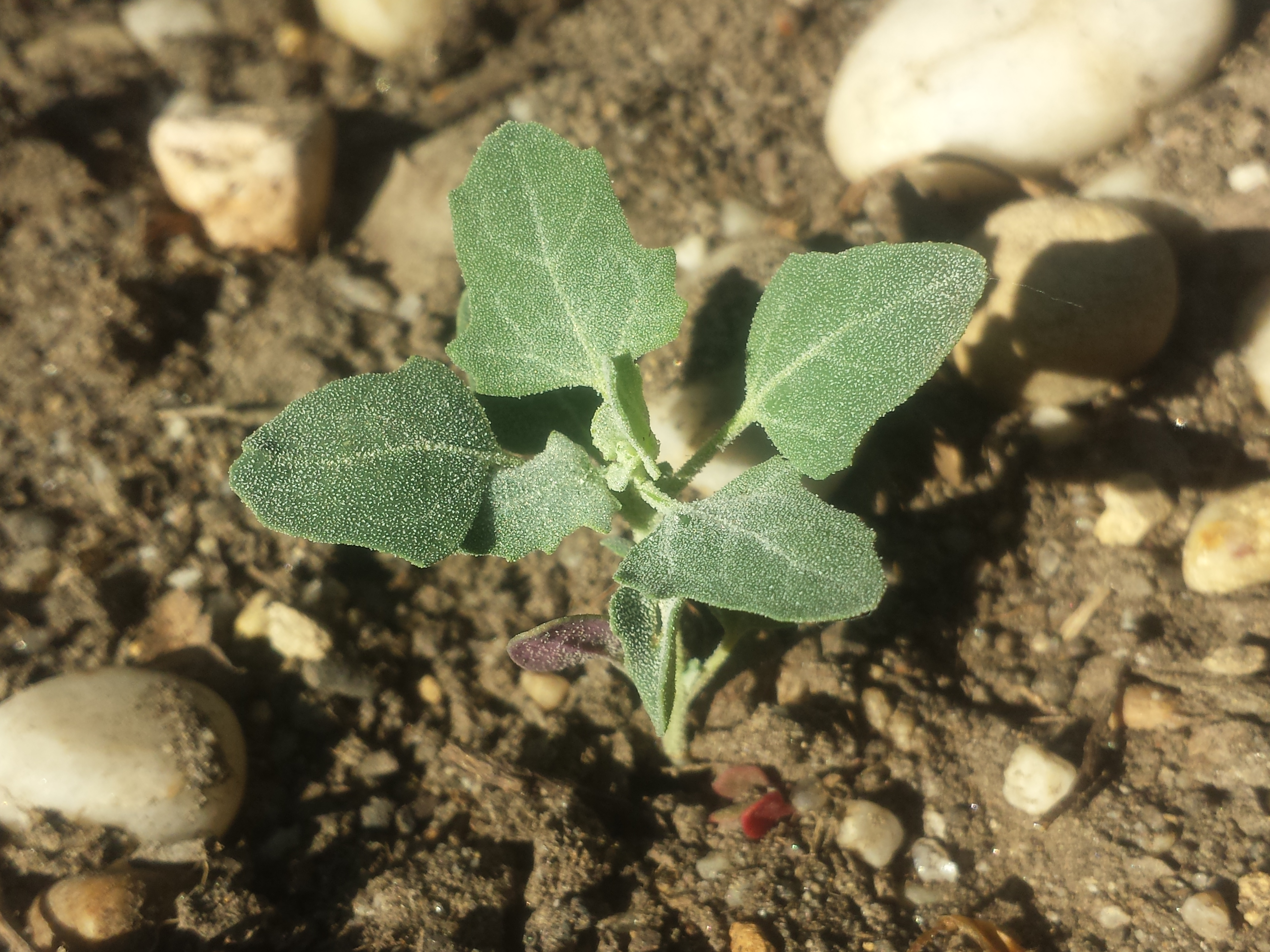
- Chenopodium opulifolium

Scientific classification
- Kingdom: Plantae
- Clade: Tracheophytes
- Clade: Angiosperms
- Clade: Eudicots
- Order: Caryophyllales
- Family: Amaranthaceae
- Genus: Chenopodium
- Species: C. opulifolium

Binomial name
- Chenopodium opulifolium Schrad. ex W.D.J.Koch & Ziz

Synonyms
- Anserina opulifolia (Schrad. ex W.D.J.Koch & Ziz) Montandon; Chenopodium album var. opulifolium (Schrad. ex W.D.J.Koch & Ziz) G.Mey.; Chenopodium album subsp. opulifolium (Schrad. ex W.D.J.Koch & Ziz) Čelak.; Vulvaria opulifolia (Schrad. ex W.D.J.Koch & Ziz) Bubani; Chenopodium erosum Bastard; Chenopodium mucronatum var. subintegrum Aellen; Chenopodium nitidispermum Sennen; Chenopodium opulifolium subsp. orientale Murr; Chenopodium opulifolium subsp. ugandae Aellen; Chenopodium triangulare Forssk.; Chenopodium ugandae (Aellen) Aellen

= Chenopodium opulifolium =

Species of plant

Chenopodium opulifolium, the seaport goosefoot, is a species of annual herb in the family Amaranthaceae (pigweeds). They have a self-supporting growth form. They are associated with freshwater habitat and have simple, broad leaves. Individuals can grow to 67 cm tall.

== Gallery ==
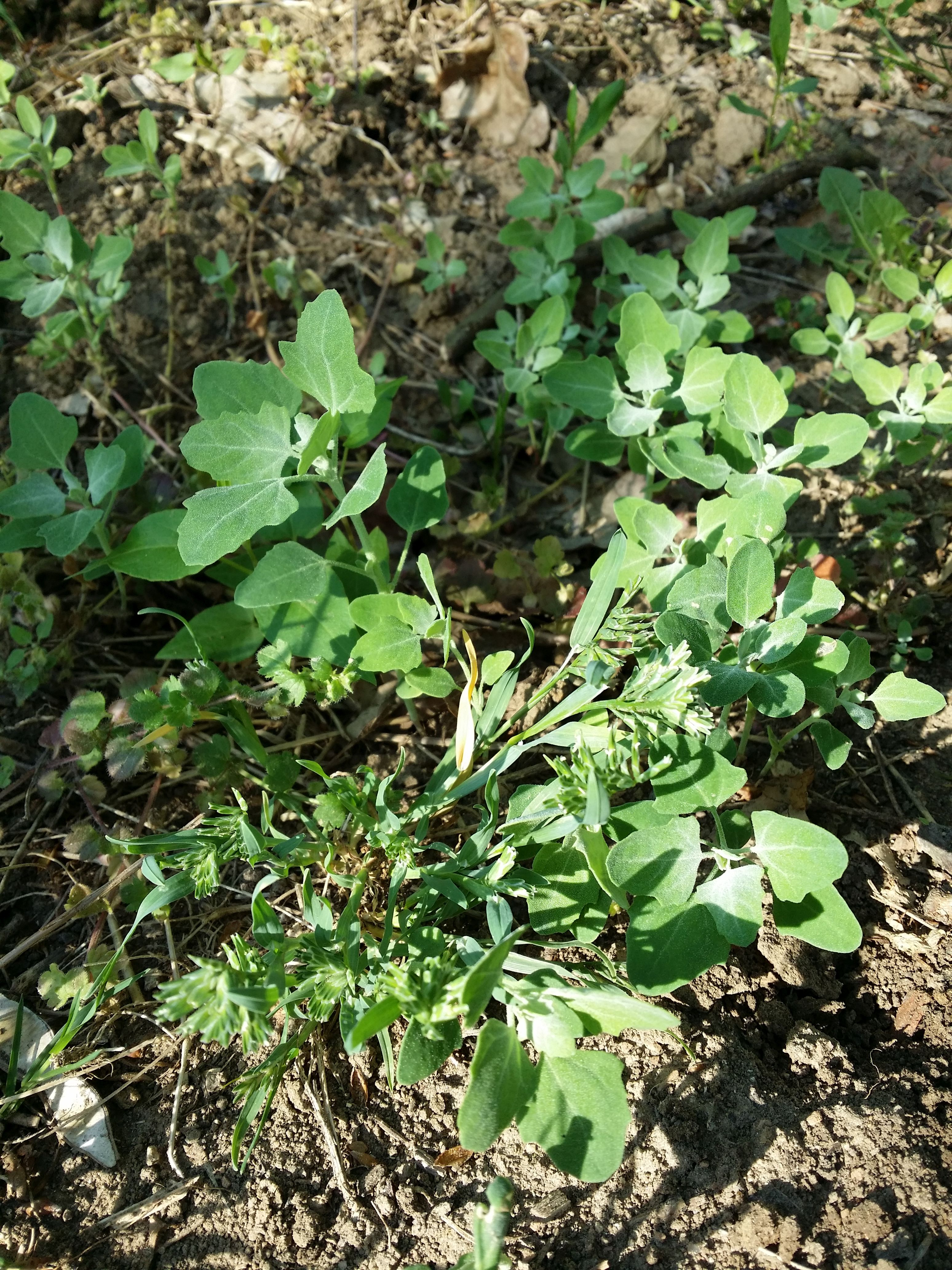
Growing wild in Austria.

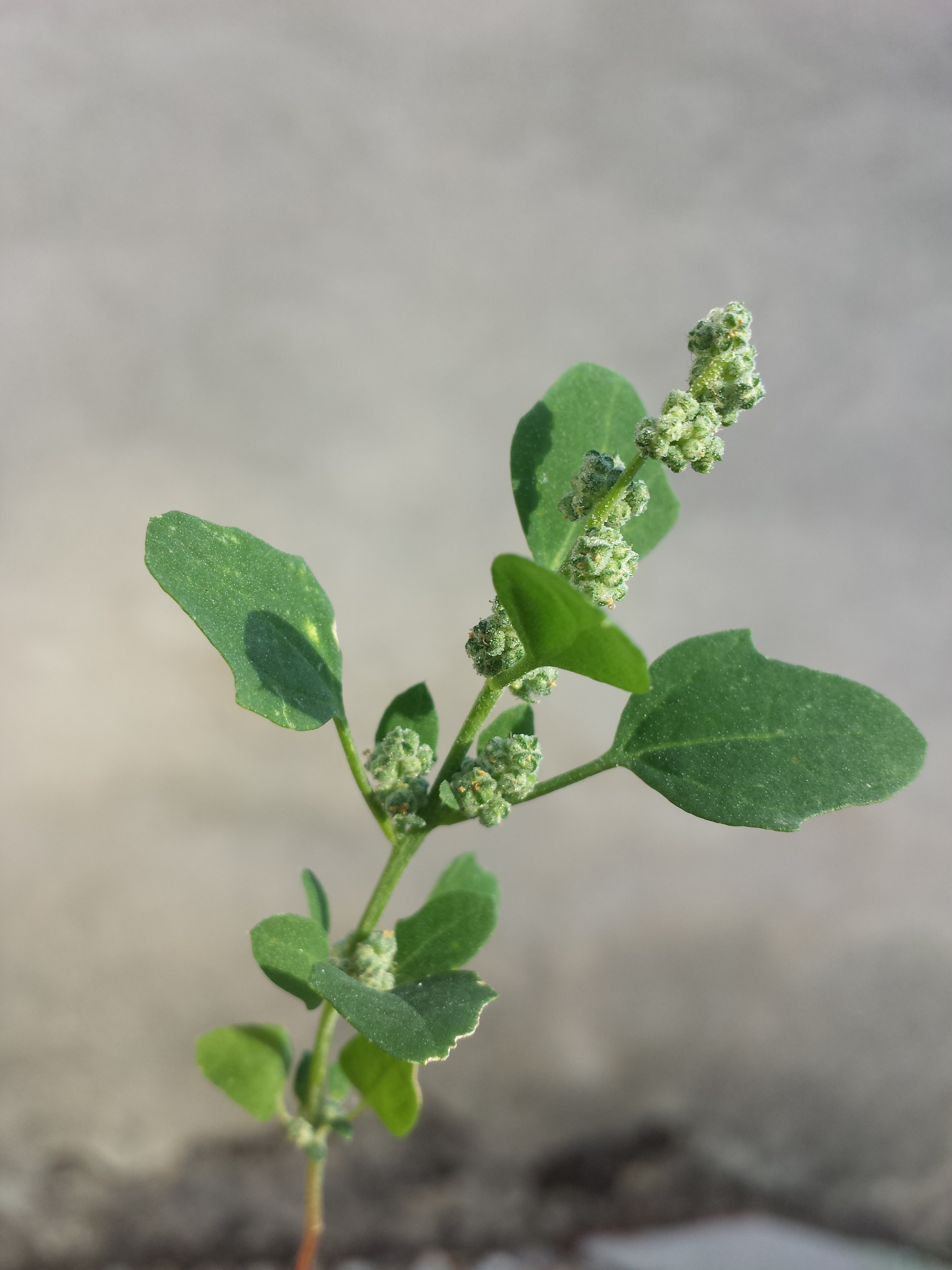
Close up.

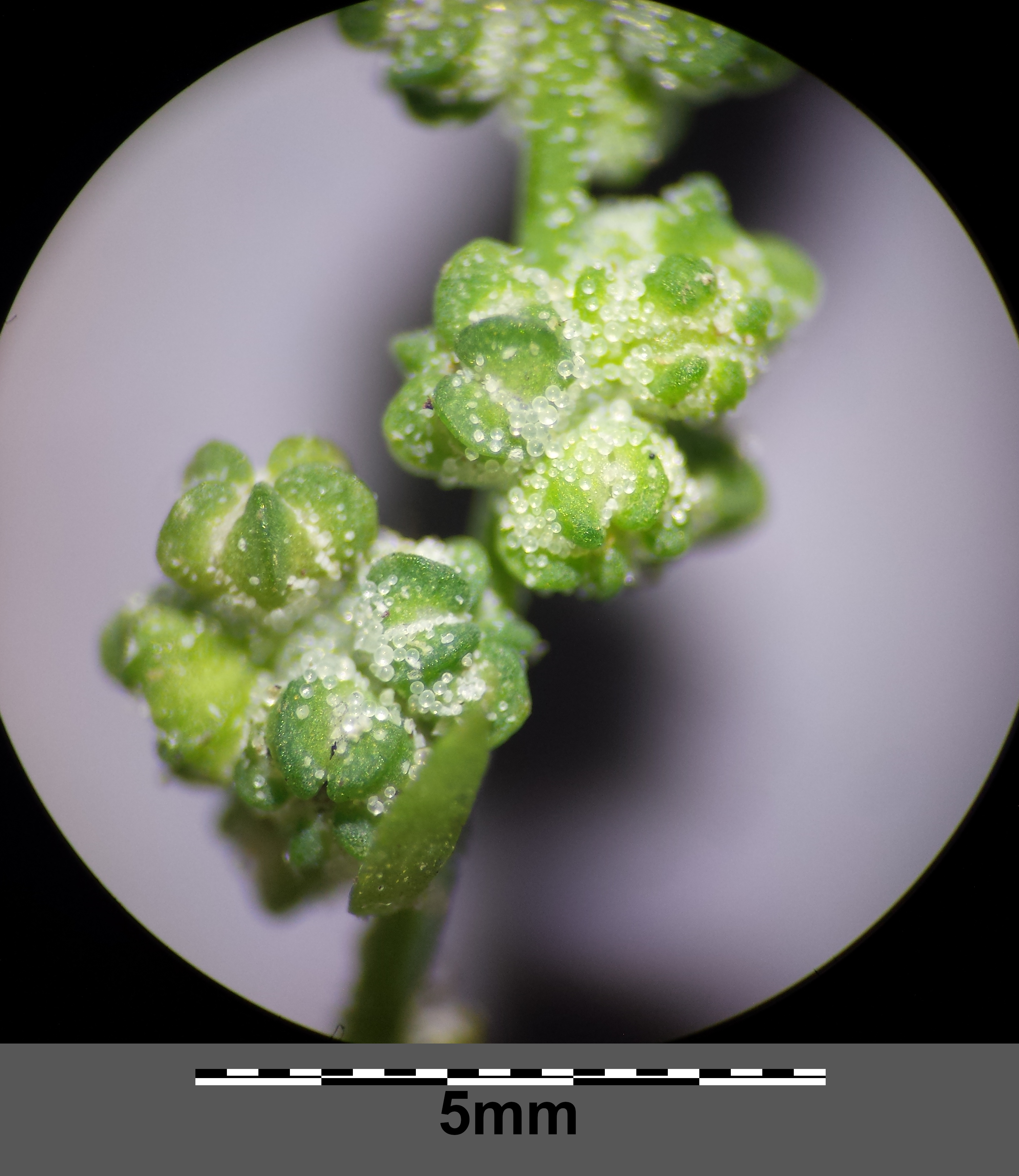
Inflorescence.
