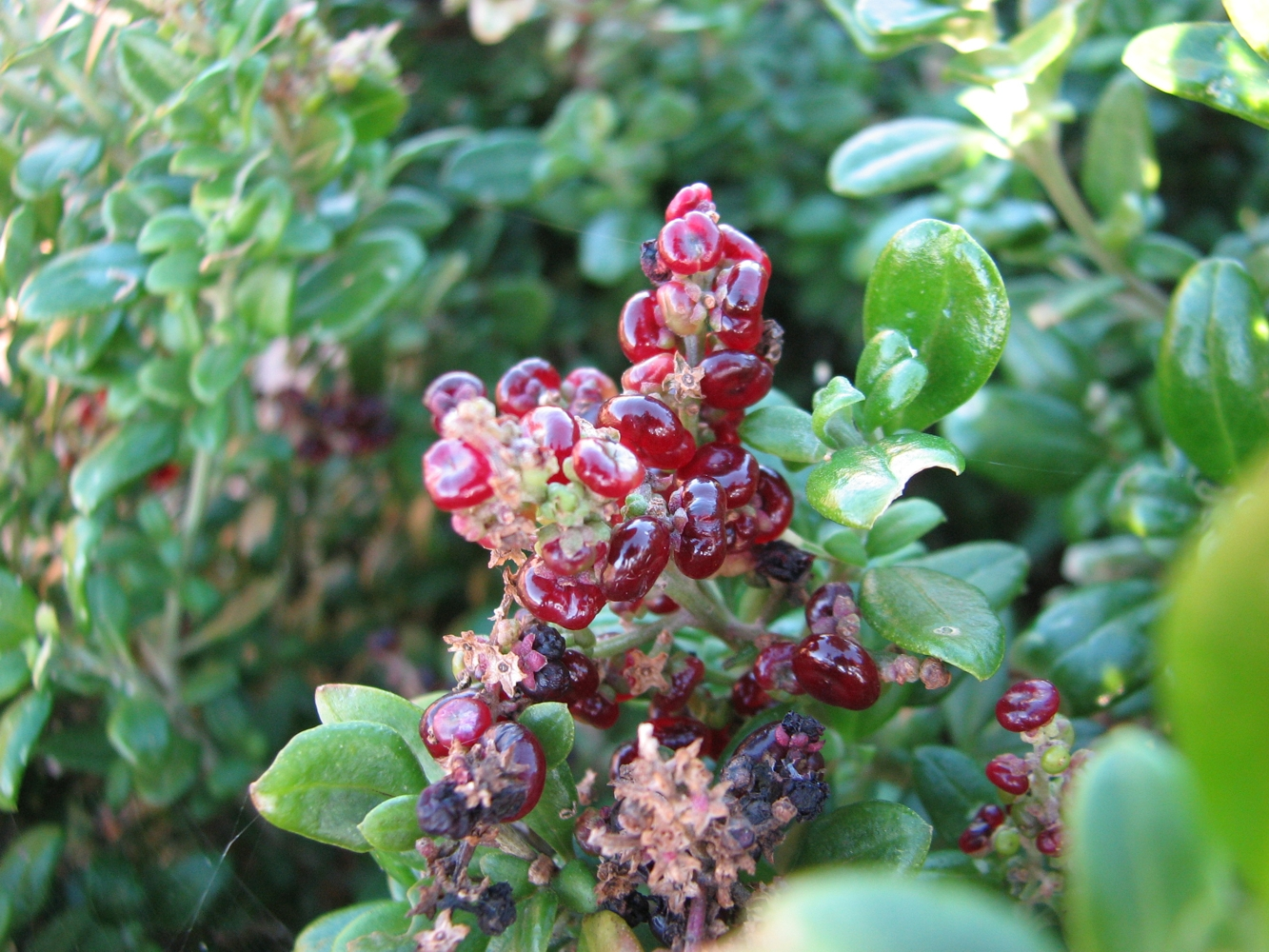
- Chenopodium candolleanum at Cape Woolamai, Victoria

Scientific classification
- Kingdom: Plantae
- Clade: Tracheophytes
- Clade: Angiosperms
- Clade: Eudicots
- Order: Caryophyllales
- Family: Amaranthaceae
- Genus: Chenopodium
- Species: C. candolleanum

Binomial name
- Chenopodium candolleanum (Moq.) S.Fuentes & Borsch

Synonyms
- Rhagodia candolleana Moq.; Rhagodia baccata var. candolleana (Moq.) Moq

= Chenopodium candolleanum =

Species of plant

Chenopodium candolleanum (Syn. Rhagodia candolleana), commonly known as seaberry saltbush, is a shrub in the subfamily Chenopodioideae of the family Amaranthaceae (sensu lato), native to Australia.

== Description ==
This species forms a dense shrub up to 2 metres in height.

It shiny green leaves are thick and almost succulent, with a paler underside. These are 1 to 3 cm long and 4-12mm wide with the widest part of the leaf towards the base.

The flowers are small and pale and arranged in panicles, appearing between December and April (early summer to mid autumn) in the species' native range. These are followed by flattened dark-red fruits which are up to 4 mm in diameter.

== Taxonomy ==
The species was first formally described in 1840 in Chenopodearum Monographica Enumeratio by Alfred Moquin-Tandon. After phylogenetical research, Fuentes-Bazan et al. (2012) included this species in genus Chenopodium.

The species name Rhagodia baccata has sometimes been misapplied to this species.

Two subspecies are currently recognised:

- Chenopodium candolleanum subsp. argenteum (Paul G. Wilson) S.Fuentes & Borsch - has a silvery appearance
- Chenopodium candolleanum subsp. candolleanum

== Distribution ==
The species occurs in Western Australia, South Australia, Victoria and New South Wales. Chenopodium candolleanum subsp. candolleanum is a coastal plant, found on cliffs and dunes, often scrambling among other shrubs. The subspecies Chenopodium candolleanum subsp. argenteum occurs near inland salt lakes.

== Uses ==
The leaves can be cooked and eaten. Aboriginal people are reported to have consumed the berries, despite their bitterness.
