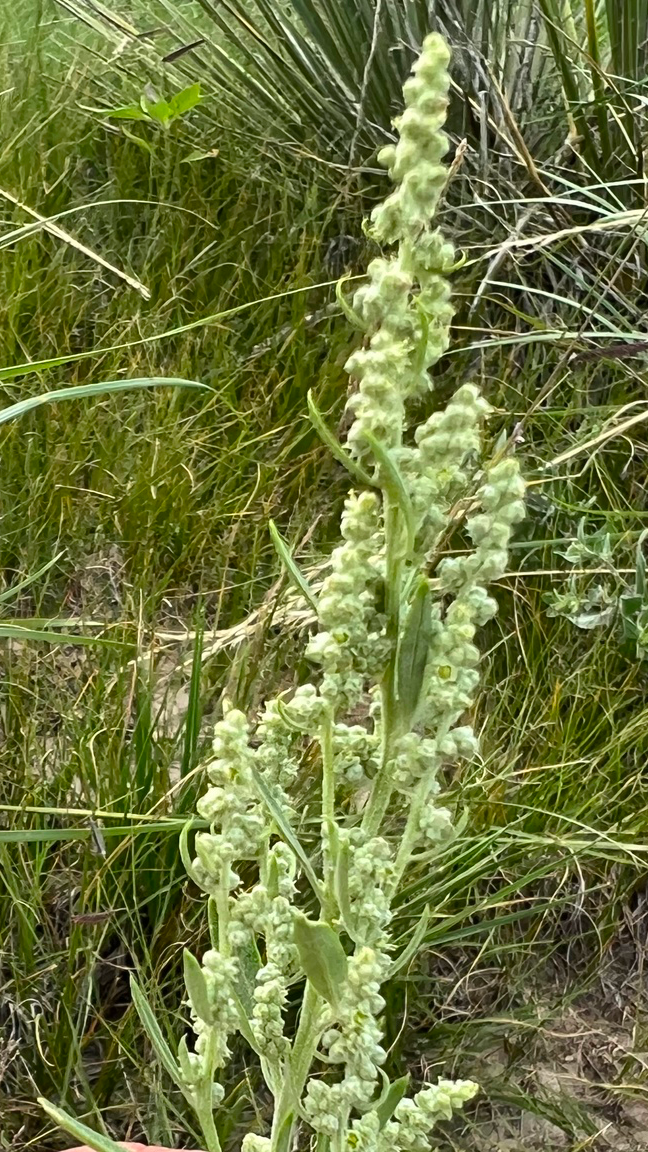

Conservation status
- Secure (NatureServe)

Scientific classification
- Kingdom: Plantae
- Clade: Tracheophytes
- Clade: Angiosperms
- Clade: Eudicots
- Order: Caryophyllales
- Family: Amaranthaceae
- Genus: Chenopodium
- Species: C. desiccatum

Binomial name
- Chenopodium desiccatum A.Nels.

= Chenopodium desiccatum =

Species of flowering plant

Chenopodium desiccatum is a species of flowering plant in the family Amaranthaceae known by the common names aridland goosefoot and slimleaf goosefoot.

It is native to parts of western North America, including sections of the Western United States and southern Western Canada. It grows naturally in open land such as prairie and dunes, chaparral, adapts well to disturbed areas such as roadsides, and in montane habitats such as in the Transverse Ranges and Sierra Nevada of California.

== Description ==
Chenopodium desiccatum is an annual herb producing an erect, branching stem up to about 35 centimeters in maximum height. It is powdery in texture, especially on the leaves and flowers. The fleshy leaves are less than 3 centimeters long and generally oval in shape with a smooth edge. The inflorescence is an array of tightly-packed clusters of tiny flowers. Each dusty flower has a five-lobed corolla which encloses the developing fruit.
