= Chenopodium cycloides =

Conservation status
- Vulnerable (NatureServe)

Scientific classification
- Kingdom: Plantae
- Clade: Tracheophytes
- Clade: Angiosperms
- Clade: Eudicots
- Order: Caryophyllales
- Family: Amaranthaceae
- Genus: Chenopodium
- Species: C. cycloides

Binomial name
- Chenopodium cycloides A.Nelson

Species of flowering plant

Chenopodium cycloides is a species of flowering plant in the family Amaranthaceae known by the common name sandhill goosefoot. It is native to the south-central United States.

This "somewhat unremarkable" species is an annual herb with branching green or blue-green, reddish-striped stem up to 80 centimeters tall. The leaves are linear in shape and sometimes fleshy. The herbage may be mealy in texture. The inflorescence is a spiraling cluster of greenish flowers. The fruit is an achene containing black seeds.

This plant can be found in eastern Colorado, eastern New Mexico, southwestern Kansas, southwestern Nebraska, western Texas, and possibly Oklahoma. It grows in sandy soils, often around blowouts. It grows in several assemblages of flora, often in places dominated by Artemisia filifolia, the sand sage. It may grow in shortgrass prairie.
