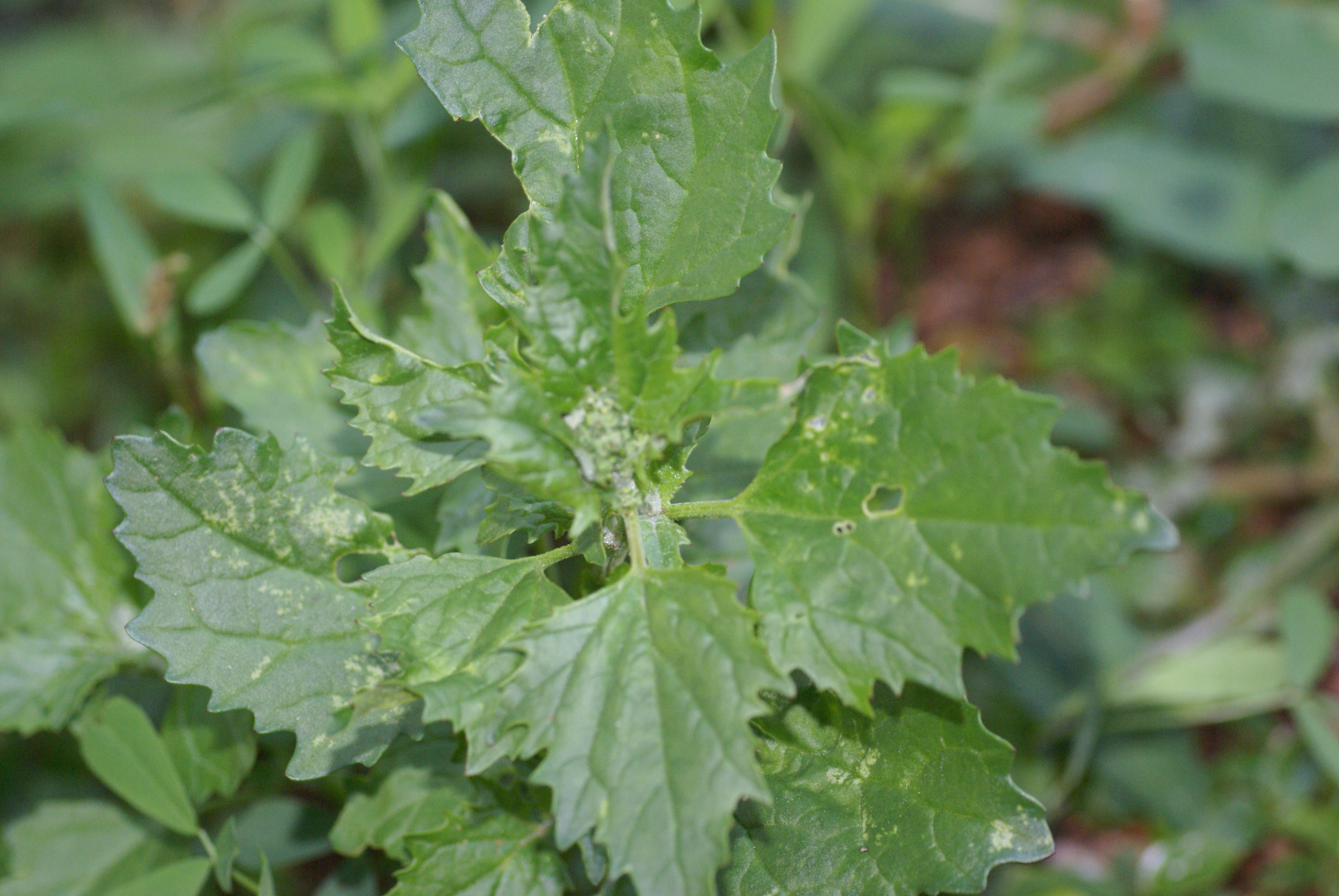

Scientific classification
- Kingdom: Plantae
- Clade: Embryophytes
- Clade: Tracheophytes
- Clade: Angiosperms
- Clade: Eudicots
- Order: Caryophyllales
- Family: Amaranthaceae
- Genus: Chenopodium
- Species: C. suecicum

Binomial name
- Chenopodium suecicum Murr

= Chenopodium suecicum =

Species of flowering plant

Chenopodium suecicum is a species of flowering plant belonging to the family Amaranthaceae. It belongs to the group of B-genome diploids (2n = 18) and likely participated in the formation of the Eurasian hexaploid C. album complex (genome BBCCDD) as well as the New World C. berlandieri complex (genome AABB). Consequently, it is a potentially valuable genetic resource for improving the pseudocereal crop quinoa.

Synonyms:

- Chenopodium album f. pseudopulifolium Scholz
- Chenopodium pseudopulifolium (Scholz) Murr
