= Chenopodium littoreum =

Conservation status
- Critically Imperiled (NatureServe)

Scientific classification
- Kingdom: Plantae
- Clade: Embryophytes
- Clade: Tracheophytes
- Clade: Spermatophytes
- Clade: Angiosperms
- Clade: Eudicots
- Order: Caryophyllales
- Family: Amaranthaceae
- Genus: Chenopodium
- Species: C. littoreum

Binomial name
- Chenopodium littoreum Benet-Pierce & M.G.Simpson

Species of flowering plant in the amaranth family

Chenopodium littoreum is an uncommon species of flowering plant in the family Amaranthaceae. It is endemic to California, known only from sections of the coastline of central California, in San Luis Obispo and Santa Barbara Counties.

== Taxonomy ==
Several characteristics separate this plant from any other Chenopodium. Specimens of the plant have been long mistaken for introductions of Chenopodium carnosulum, a South American species. Studies indicate it is different in a number of characteristics and it was described as a new species in 2010.

== Description ==
Chenopodium littoreum is an annual herb forming prostrate mats on coastal dunes.

The leaves are lance-shaped or elliptic in shape and borne on short petioles. They are rarely lobed. They are light green in color and coated with powdery exudate.

The flowers are only about a millimetre in diameter and consistently have five yellow stamens.
