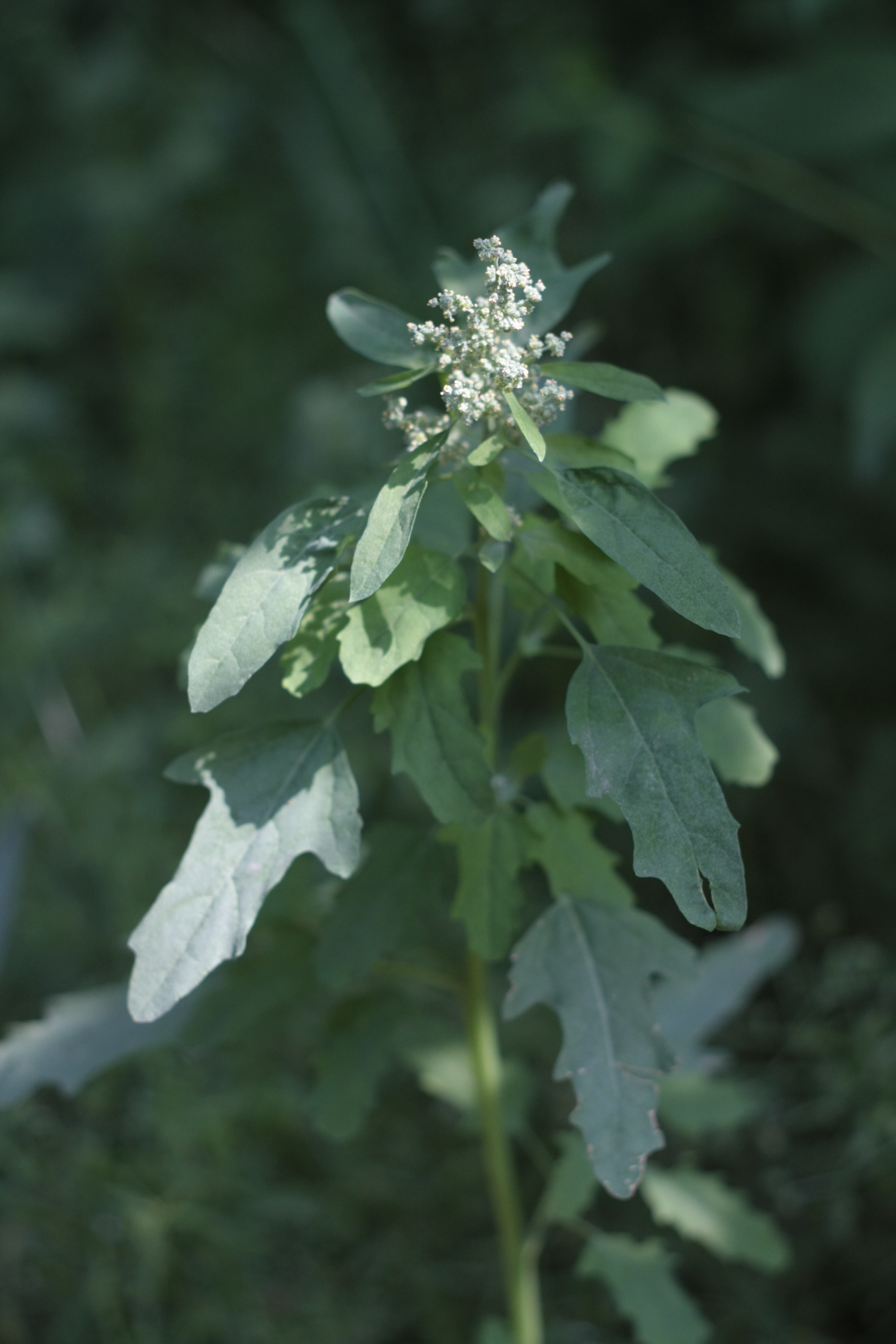
- In bloom in South Korea

Scientific classification
- Kingdom: Plantae
- Clade: Embryophytes
- Clade: Tracheophytes
- Clade: Angiosperms
- Clade: Eudicots
- Order: Caryophyllales
- Family: Amaranthaceae
- Genus: Chenopodium
- Species: C. ficifolium

Binomial name
- Chenopodium ficifolium Sm.

Synonyms
- Chenopodium filifolium Krock.; Chenopodium trilobatum Jáv., 1926

= Chenopodium ficifolium =

Species of plant in the family Amaranthaceae

Chenopodium ficifolium, the fig-leaved goosefoot or figleaf goosefoot, is a plant species in the family Amaranthaceae originally native to the Irano-Turanian floristic region. It is an archaeophyte weed in Europe and can now be found in temperate crop-growing regions in most of the world.
