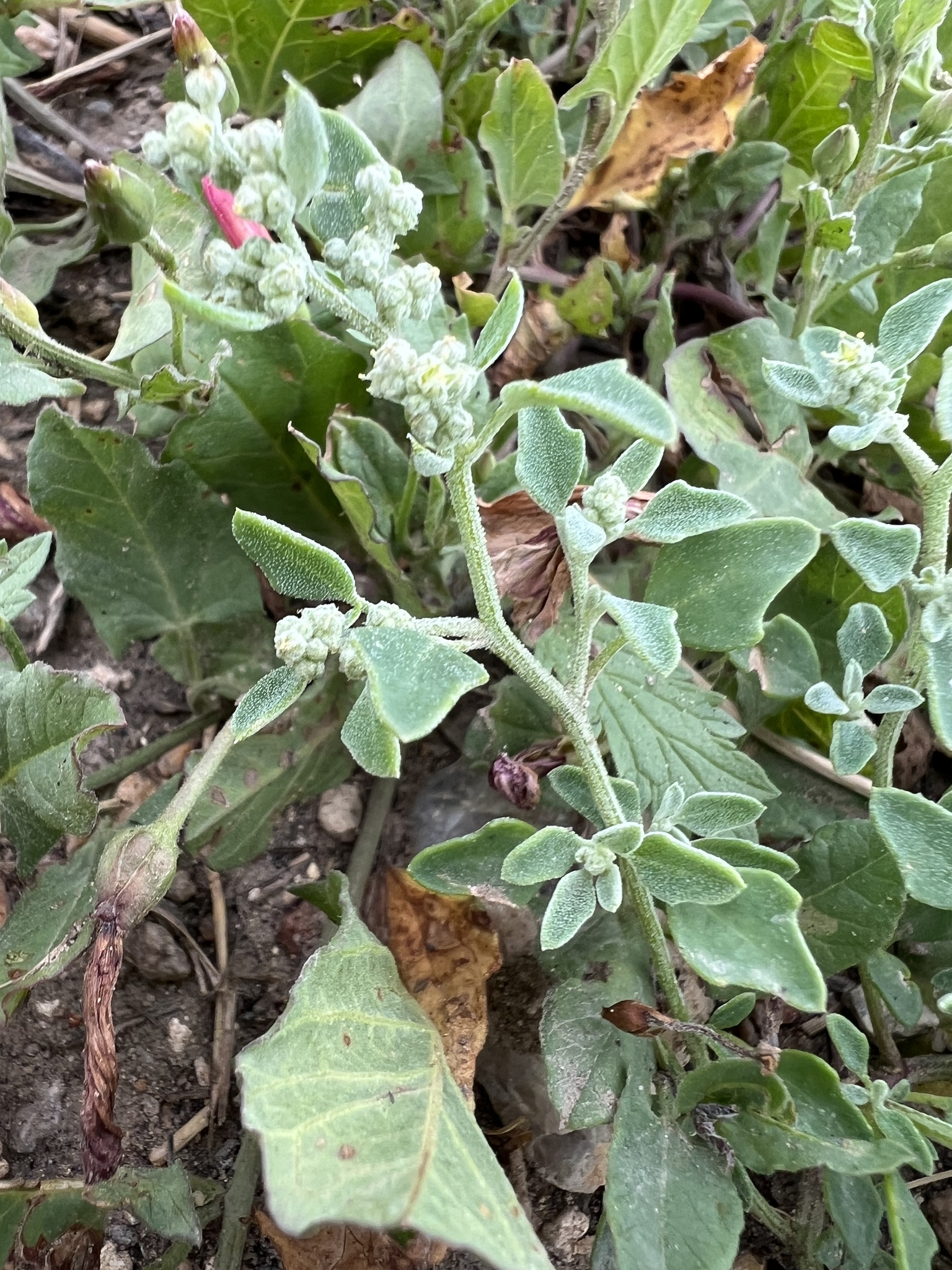

Conservation status
- Secure (NatureServe)

Scientific classification
- Kingdom: Plantae
- Clade: Tracheophytes
- Clade: Angiosperms
- Clade: Eudicots
- Order: Caryophyllales
- Family: Amaranthaceae
- Genus: Chenopodium
- Species: C. hians

Binomial name
- Chenopodium hians Standl.

= Chenopodium hians =

Species of flowering plant

Chenopodium hians is a species of flowering plant in the family Amaranthaceae known by the common names hians goosefoot and gaping goosefoot. The Latin species name hians means "gaping".

== Distribution ==
It is native to much of the western half of North America from British Columbia to California to Texas, where it grows in many types of open habitat, moist and dry, including disturbed areas such as roadsides.

== Description ==
This is an annual herb growing an erect, branching stem up 80 centimeters (31 in) in maximum height. It is powdery in texture, especially on the leaves and flowers. The leaves are up to 3 centimeters long, oval to lance-shaped with smooth edges. The inflorescence is a spike or panicle a few centimeters long made up of several clusters of tightly packed tiny flowers. Each flower has five lobes and coats the developing fruit.
