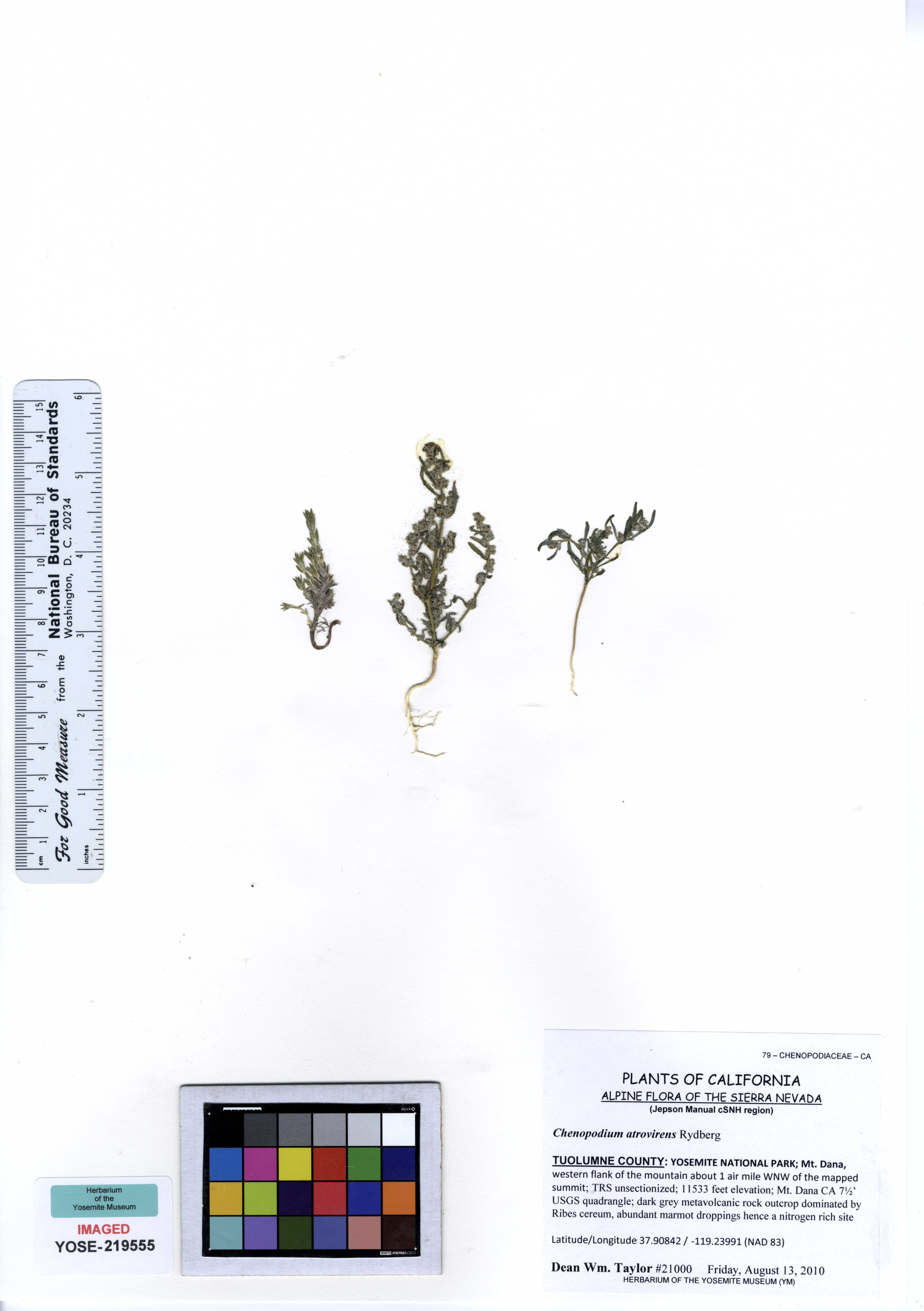

Conservation status
- Secure (NatureServe)

Scientific classification
- Kingdom: Plantae
- Clade: Tracheophytes
- Clade: Angiosperms
- Clade: Eudicots
- Order: Caryophyllales
- Family: Amaranthaceae
- Genus: Chenopodium
- Species: C. atrovirens

Binomial name
- Chenopodium atrovirens Rydb.

Synonyms
- Chenopodium aridum A. Nelson; Chenopodium fremontii S. Watson var. atrovirens (Rydb.) Fosberg; Chenopodium incognitum Wahl p.p.; Chenopodium wolfii Rydb.

= Chenopodium atrovirens =

Species of flowering plant

Chenopodium atrovirens is a species of flowering plant in the amaranth family known by the common names pinyon goosefoot and dark goosefoot.

== Distribution ==
It is native to western North America, including southern Western Canada and most of the Western United States. It grows in many types of habitat, including open, sandy sites and disturbed areas, and in montane regions such as the Sierra Nevada, Peninsular Ranges, and Rocky Mountains.

== Description ==
It is an annual herb growing an erect, branching stem up to about 60 centimeters tall, sometimes remaining much smaller. It is green to magenta in color and coated lightly in pinkish powdery dust. The leaves are oblong or oval and up to 3.5 centimeters long. They have smooth edges and sometimes have a few lobes.

The inflorescence is a rounded cluster of many minute flowers. Each tiny flower has five slightly powdery lobes in its corolla, each barely visible. The fruit is oval in shape and about a millimeter long, coating the tiny seed loosely.
