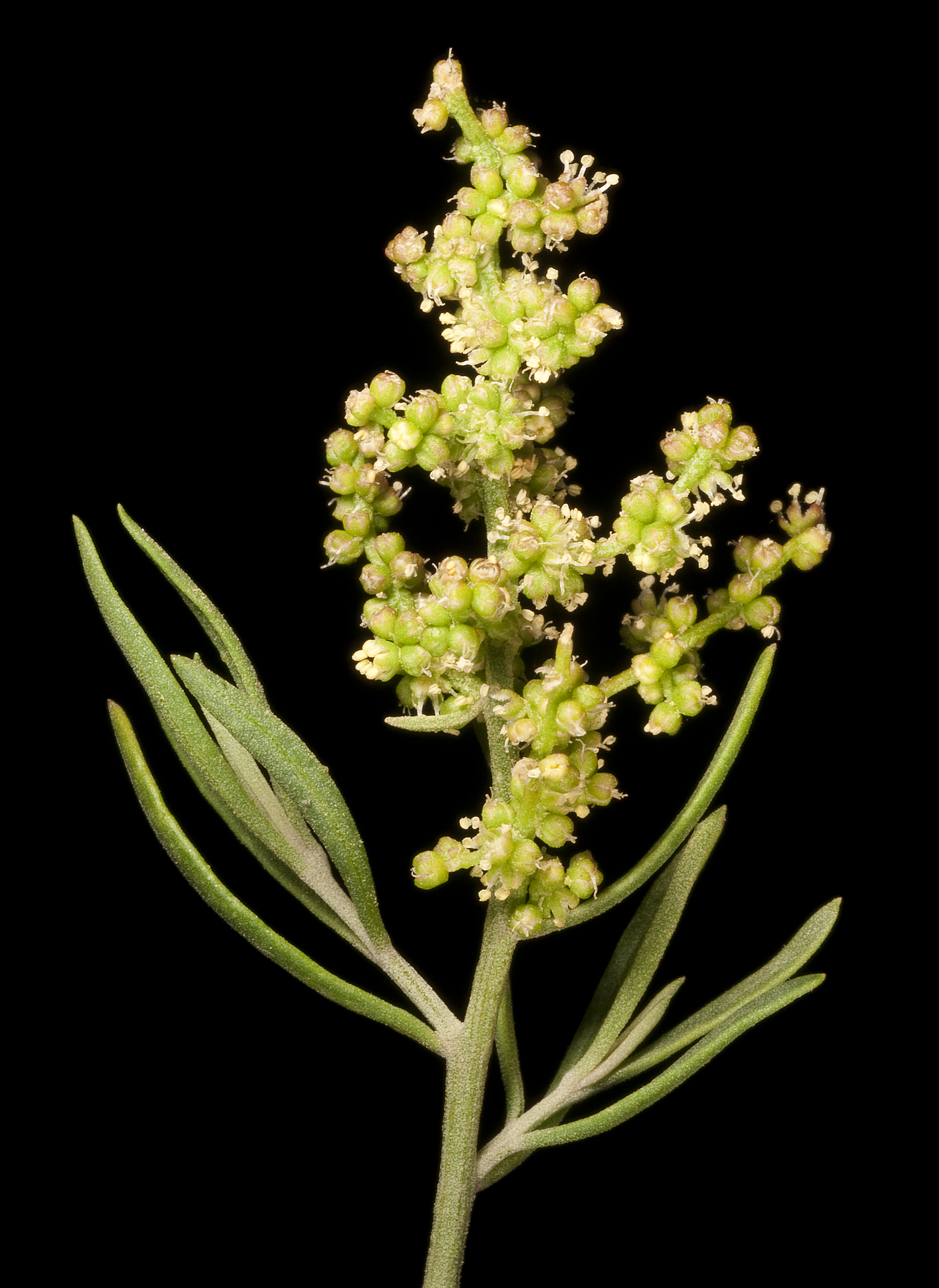
- Male flowers

Scientific classification
- Kingdom: Plantae
- Clade: Tracheophytes
- Clade: Angiosperms
- Clade: Eudicots
- Order: Caryophyllales
- Family: Amaranthaceae
- Genus: Chenopodium
- Species: C. preissii

Binomial name
- Chenopodium preissii (Moq.) Diels

Synonyms
- Rhagodia linifolia Nees; Rhagodia preissii Moq.

= Chenopodium preissii =

Species of plant

Chenopodium preissii is a plant in the Amaranthaceae family, native to Western Australia and South Australia.

It was first described by Alfred Moquin-Tandon in 1849 as Rhagodia preissii, and this is the name accepted by the Council of Heads of Australasian Herbaria. However, in 1904 Ludwig Diels transferred it to the genus, Chenopodium, and Chenopodium preissii is the name accepted by Plants of the World online.
