= Quinoa oil =

Oil extracted from germ of Chenopodium quinoa

Quinoa oil is a vegetable oil extracted from germ of the Chenopodium quinoa, an Andean cereal, and has been cultivated since at least 3000 B.C. Quinoa itself has attracted considerable interest as a source of protein, but the oil derived from quinoa is of interest in its own right. Quinoa oil is most similar to corn oil, and is rich in essential fatty acids (linoleic acid and linolenic acid), linoleic being predominant. Although, quinoa oil contains more essential fatty acids than corn oil. Quinoa yields an average of 5.8% oil by weight, compared to 3-4% for corn (maize), which means it could potentially be used to produce more oil than an amount of corn of the same weight.

Most oils with high concentrations of unsaturated fatty acids spoil quickly, but quinoa and corn oil both have high quantities of natural antioxidants, specifically tocopherol isomers, which makes them more stable and less likely to become rancid, guaranteeing a longer shelf-life.

== Uses ==
Quinoa is a natural source of vitamin E and therefore is used in many anti-aging skin products, as well as hair products. Quinoa oil is used in many recipes as a substitute for other various kinds of cooking oil. For example, it can be used in cooking, frying and salad dressing. The high level of saturated fatty acids present in the oil make it an ideal candidate for cooking use. Quinoa oil has also been used in eczema treatments.

== Production ==
Quinoa oil is produced from the cold pressing of the quinoa seed. The yield of oil by weight is an average of 6 percent and ranges from 2-9 percent. The amount of oil in quinoa is relatively high compared with other cereal grains such as corn or wheat.
