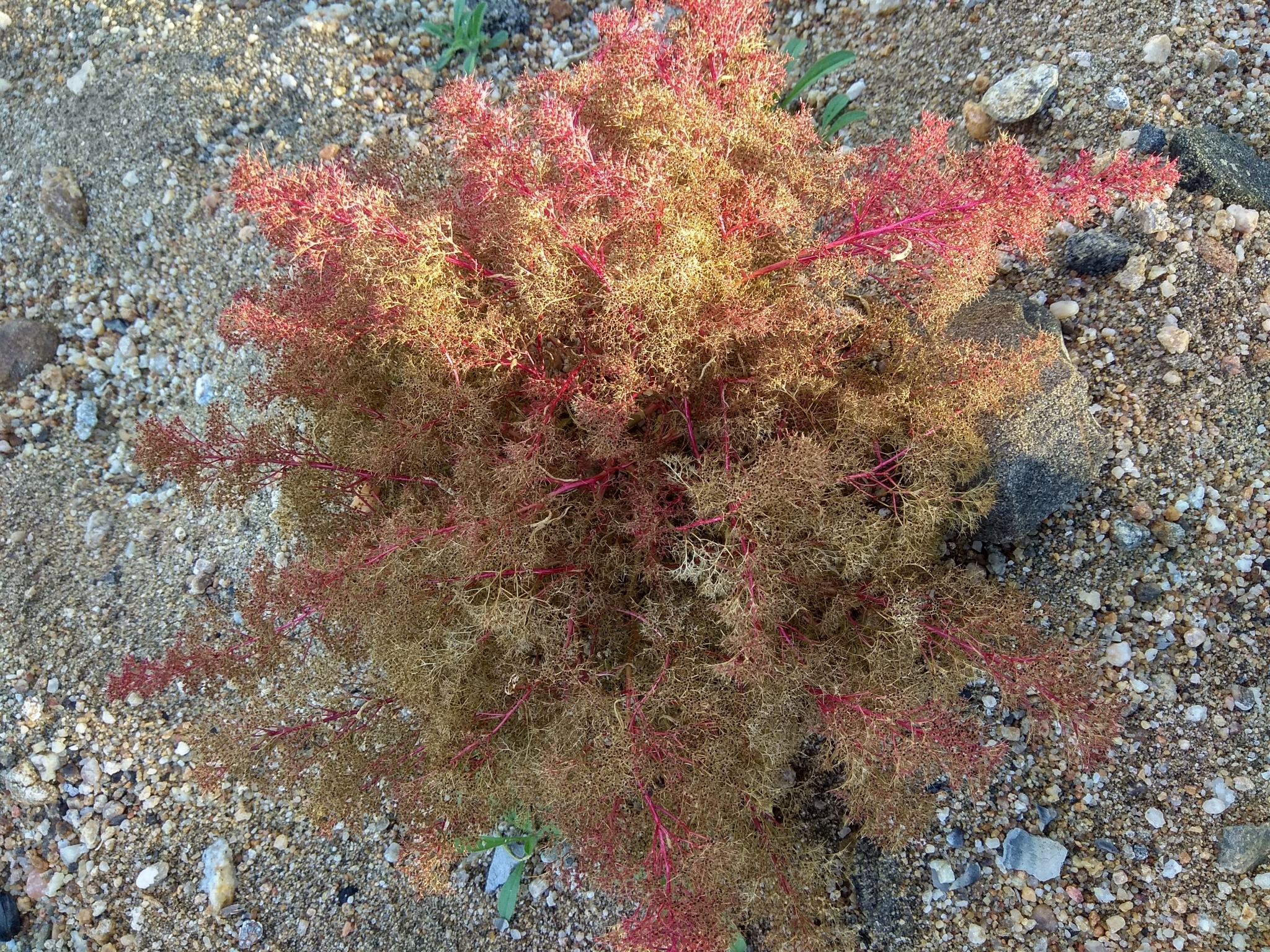

Scientific classification
- Kingdom: Plantae
- Clade: Tracheophytes
- Clade: Angiosperms
- Clade: Eudicots
- Order: Caryophyllales
- Family: Amaranthaceae
- Tribe: Dysphanieae
- Genus: Teloxys; Moq. (1834)
- Species: T. aristata

Binomial name
- Teloxys aristata (L.) Moq. (1834)

Synonyms
- Atriplex aristata (L.) Crantz (1766); Chenopodium acuminatum var. minimum (W.Wang & P.Y.Fu) Z.S.Qin (1995); Chenopodium aristatum L. (1753) (basionym); Chenopodium aristatum var. inerme W.Z.Di (1986 publ. 1987); Chenopodium minimum W.Wang & P.Y.Fu (1959); Chenopodium secundiflorum Viv. (1824); Chenopodium sinense Willemet (1778); Chenopodium sinense Moq. (1849), nom. illeg.; Chenopodium virgatum var. minimum (W.Wang & P.Y.Fu) Kitag. (1979); Chenopodium virginicum L. (1753); Dysphania aristata (L.) Mosyakin & Clemants (2002); Dysphania aristata var. inermis (W.Z.Di) Y.Z.Zhao (2012); Lecanocarpus aristata (L.) Zucc. (1829); Salsola canescens Pers. (1805), nom. superfl.

= Teloxys =

Genus of flowering plants

Teloxys aristata is a species of flowering plant belonging to the family Amaranthaceae. It is the sole species in genus Teloxys. It is an annual native to temperate Eurasia, ranging from European Russia to China and Korea.

== Uses ==
Teloxys aristata is used to model trees for model railways, architectural and other scenic models. It is generally referred to as 'seafoam' by modellers.
