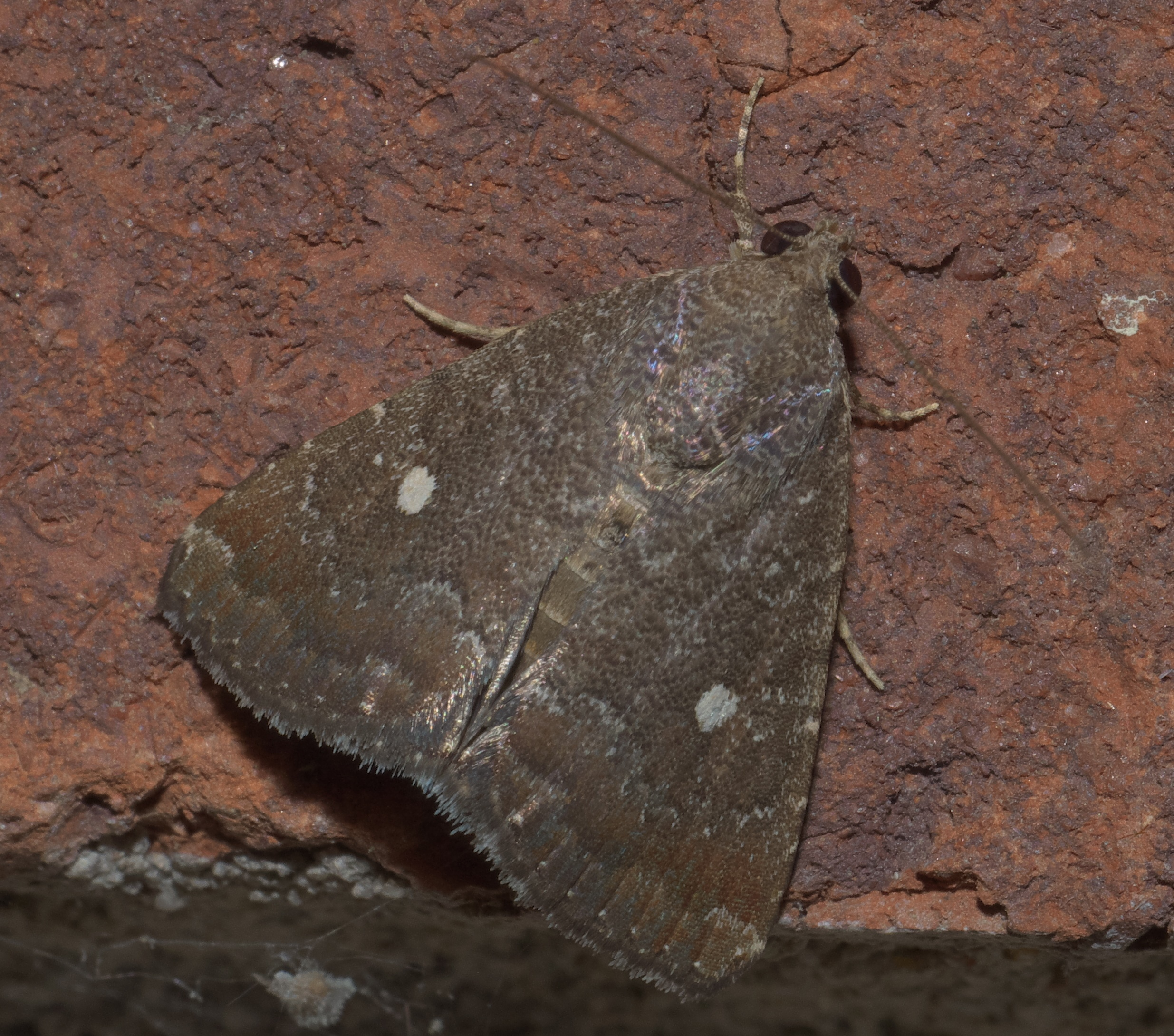
- Amyna stricta, eight-spot moth

Scientific classification
- Domain: Eukaryota
- Kingdom: Animalia
- Phylum: Arthropoda
- Class: Insecta
- Order: Lepidoptera
- Superfamily: Noctuoidea
- Family: Noctuidae
- Subfamily: Bagisarinae
- Genus: Amyna
- Species: A. stricta

Binomial name
- Amyna stricta (Walker, 1858)

= Amyna stricta =

Species of Moth

Amyna stricta, the eight-spot moth, is a species of owlet moth in the family Noctuidae. It is found in North, Central, and South America.

The New World population of Amyna axis was determined to be a separate species in 2015, and is now classified as this species, Amyna stricta.

== Distribution ==
The moth is common in southern North America, from Florida to Arizona. It is a regular migrant to the mid-eastern states, and rarely as far as Wisconsin, Ontario and Quebec. It migrates north each year in late summer and fall.

The MONA or Hodges number for Amyna stricta is 9070.

=== Food plants ===
The larvae feed on Amaranthus, Croton, Celosia, Digera, Helianthus, Chenopodium, Spinacia, Ipomoea, Ricinus, Arachis, Crotalaria, Medicago, Phaseolus, Hibiscus, Cardiospermum, Solanum, Corchorus and Parasponia species.

It is an irregular minor pest of mung beans (Vigna radiata), black-eyed peas (Vigna unguiclata), lucerne (Medicago sativa) and soy beans (Glycine max). Their prevalence may be under reported due to the resemblance of the caterpillar with those of Chrysoieixis species.

=== Early stages ===
The larvae are thin bodied and have faint white stripes and two pairs of ventral prolegs. At low densities of groups, caterpillars are pale green. Among caterpillars at high densities, there are higher frequencies of melanistic phenotypes. The degree of blackening varied widely, ranging from individuals with simple subdorsal-lateral patches to those that were mostly black.

Larvae perch on the undersides of leaves and along stems and petioles. At rest, the abdominal segments are often looped upward. When alarmed the larva essentially jumps from the host and continues to wreathe and wriggle wildly. Prepupal larvae take on a pinkish cast. Pupation occurs in a silken cocoon below (usually) or at the soil surface. Sand and/or plant debris are interwoven into the cocoon wall.

=== Adult ===
The adult moth is chocolate brown above and has a wingspan of 20–25 mm (0.79–0.98 in). The forewings have faint greyish-white lines and an obscure figure-of-eight mark on it. The hindwings are lighter with fainter markings. The male can be differentiated by the presence of a small semi-transparent patch on each wing. Adults are on wing from August to October. Forewing of male with a small vesicle in cell, with a small valve of scales over it on underside, the median nervure being slightly curved. It is smaller than Amyna punctum.

== Gallery ==
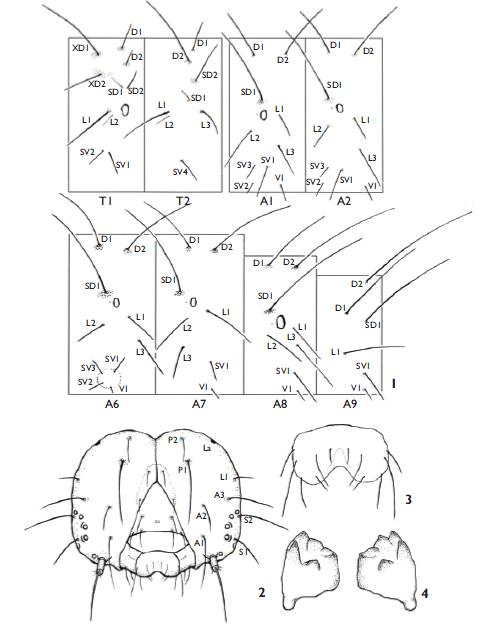
Last instar larva: 1. Chaetotaxy. SD2 on abdomen represented only by its pinaculum (forward of spiracle); 2. Head, frontal; 3. Labrum, frontal; 4. Mandibles, mesal surfaces

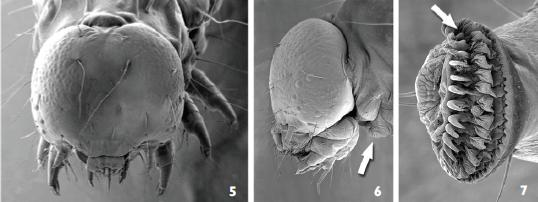
Last instar larva: 5. Head, frontal; 6. Head, lateral, with prothoracic gland (adenosma) indicated; 7. Crochets, with subapical tooth indicated

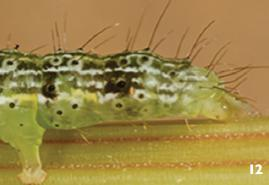
Larvae caudal segments

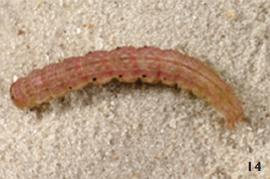
Prepupa

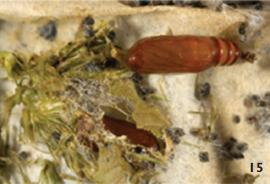
Pupa and cocoon

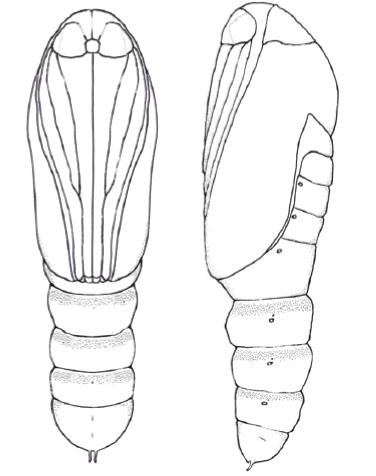
Pupa ventral (left), lateral (right)
