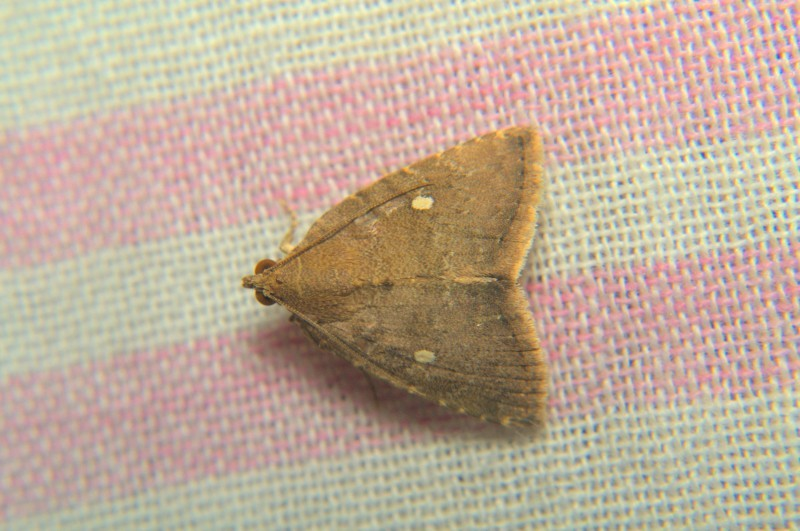
- Amyna axis, Oriental Eight-Spot, India

Scientific classification
- Kingdom: Animalia
- Phylum: Arthropoda
- Class: Insecta
- Order: Lepidoptera
- Superfamily: Noctuoidea
- Family: Noctuidae
- Genus: Amyna
- Species: A. axis

Binomial name
- Amyna axis (Guenée, 1852)

Synonyms
- Perigea octo Guenée, 1852; Amyna octo (Guenée, 1852); Perigea axis Guenée, 1852; Poaphila stricta Walker, 1858; Calaena flavigutta Walker, 1858; Celaena perfundens Walker, 1858; Ilattia cephusalis Walker, [1859]; Amyna colon Guenée, 1862; Perigea vexabilis Wallengren, 1863; Miana inornata Walker, 1865; Celaena obstructa Walker, 1862; Perigea leucospila Walker, 1865; Erastria stigmatula Snellen, 1872; Stridova albigutta Walker, 1869; Erastria bavia Felder & Rogenhofer, 1874; Segetia orbica Morrison, 1875; Amyna undulifera Butler, 1875; Chytoryza tecta Grote, 1876; Botys monotretalis Mabille, 1879; Perigea supplex Swinhoe, 1885; Berresa rufa Bethune-Baker, 1906

= Amyna axis =

Species of moth

Amyna axis, the oriental eight-spot, is a moth of the family Noctuidae. The species was first described by Achille Guenée in 1852.

== Distribution ==
It occurs in Africa, temperate Asia, Australia and the Cook Islands. The New World population of Amyna axis was determined to be a separate species, Amyna stricta, in 2015.

The moth migrates north each year in late summer and fall.

=== Food plants ===
The larvae feed on Amaranthus, Croton, Celosia, Digera, Helianthus, Chenopodium, Spinacia, Ipomoea, Ricinus, Arachis, Crotalaria, Medicago, Phaseolus, Hibiscus, Cardiospermum, Solanum, Corchorus and Parasponia species.

It is an irregular minor pest of mung beans (Vigna radiata), black-eyed peas (Vigna unguiclata), lucerne (Medicago sativa) and soy beans (Glycine max). Its prevalence may be under reported due to the resemblance of the caterpillar with those of Chrysoieixis species.

=== Early stages ===
The larvae are thin bodied and have faint white stripes and two pairs of ventral prolegs. At low densities of groups, caterpillars are pale green. Among caterpillars at high densities, there are higher frequencies of melanistic phenotypes. The degree of blackening varied widely, ranging from individuals with simple subdorsal-lateral patches to those that were mostly black.

Larvae perch on the undersides of leaves and along stems and petioles. At rest, the abdominal segments are often looped upward. When alarmed the larva essentially jumps from the host and continues to wreathe and wriggle wildly. Prepupal larvae take on a pinkish cast. Pupation occurs in a silken cocoon below (usually) or at the soil surface. Sand and/or plant debris are interwoven into the cocoon wall.

=== Adult ===
The adult moth is chocolate brown above and has a wingspan of 20–25 mm (0.79–0.98 in). The forewings have faint greyish-white lines and an obscure figure-of-eight mark on it. The hindwings are lighter with fainter markings. The male can be differentiated by the presence of a small semi-transparent patch on each wing. Adults are on wing in late summer and early fall. Forewing of male with a small vesicle in cell, with a small valve of scales over it on underside, the median nervure being slightly curved. It is smaller than Amyna punctum.
