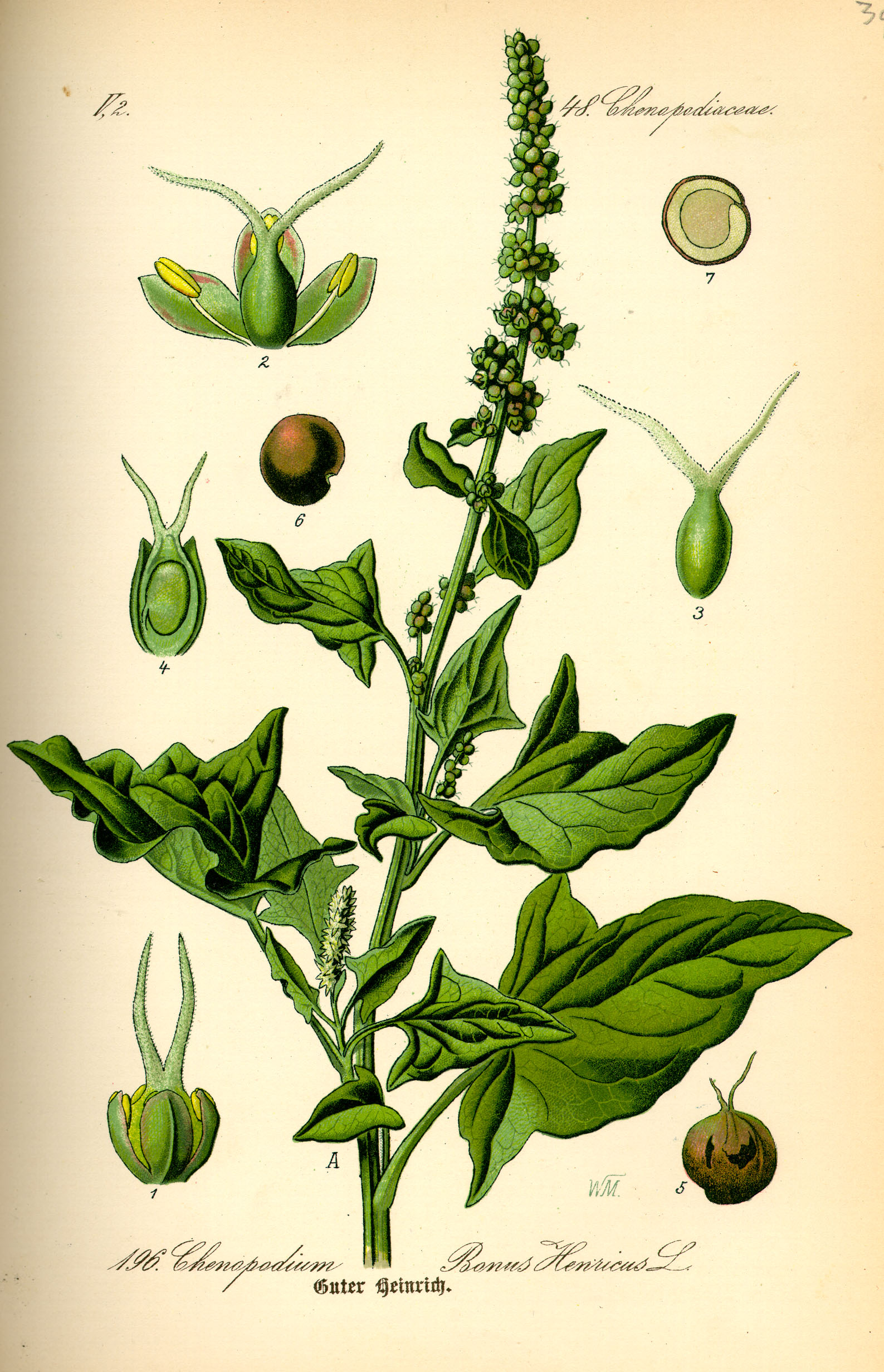

Scientific classification
- Kingdom: Plantae
- Clade: Tracheophytes
- Clade: Angiosperms
- Clade: Eudicots
- Order: Caryophyllales
- Family: Amaranthaceae
- Genus: Blitum
- Species: B. bonus-henricus

Binomial name
- Blitum bonus-henricus (L.) Rchb.

Synonyms
- see text

= Blitum bonus-henricus =

Good-King-Henry

Species of flowering plant

Blitum bonus-henricus (syn. Chenopodium bonus-henricus), also called Good-King-Henry, poor-man's asparagus, perennial goosefoot, Lincolnshire spinach, Markery, English mercury, or mercury goosefoot, is a species of goosefoot which is native to much of central and southern Europe.

Good-King-Henry has been grown as a vegetable in cottage gardens for hundreds of years, although this dual-purpose vegetable is now rarely grown and the species is more often considered a weed.

There have been several hypotheses concerning the naming of the plant. One is that the name originates from the German “Guter Heinrich” (Good Henry) to distinguish it from “Böser Heinrich” (Bad Henry) which is a poisonous plant and refers to Mercurialis perennis. In German culture the name Henry has often been given to elves, kobolds, or household spirits and was, therefore, often integrated into the name of crops in the garden. The “King” was then added later on in English, but no clear association with any king has been demonstrated.

== Description ==
It is an annual or perennial plant growing up to 60 centimetres (24 inches) tall. The leaves are 5–10 cm (2–4 in) long and broad, triangular to diamond-shaped, with a pair of broad pointed lobes near the base, with a slightly waxy, succulent texture. The flowers are produced in a tall, nearly leafless spike 10–30 cm (4–12 in) long; each flower is very small (3–5 millimetres or 1/8–3/16 inch in diameter), greenish, with five sepals. The seeds are reddish-green, 2–3 mm in diameter.

== Taxonomy ==
The species was described in 1753 by Carl Linnaeus as Chenopodium bonus-henricus in Species Plantarum. Until 2012, the species was usually included in genus Chenopodium, but molecular genetical research revealed that it does not really belong to this genus. It seems to be more closely related to the genus Spinacia, and is now placed in the genus Blitum in the tribe Anserineae. The scientific name Blitum bonus-henricus was first used by Ludwig Reichenbach in 1832.

Synonyms based on the same type specimen are: Agathophytum bonus-henricus (L.) Moq., Anserina bonus-henricus (L.) Dumort., Atriplex bonus-henricus (L.) Crantz, Chenopodium bonus-henricus L., Orthospermum bonus-henricus (L.) Schur, and Orthosporum bonus-henricus (L.) T. Nees. Heterotypic synonyms are: Blitum perenne Bubani, Chenopodium hastatum St.-Lag., Chenopodium ruderale Kit. ex Moq., Chenopodium ruderale St.-Lag., Chenopodium sagittatum Lam., Chenopodium spinacifolium Stokes, Chenopodium triangulare Dulac, Chenopodium triangularifolia Gilib., and Orthosporum unctuosum Montandon.

== Distribution and habitat ==
It can generally be found throughout Britain and Europe, except in the southeast. Native to southern and central Europe, Good-King-Henry originates from the Alps and later grew also into lowlands where it was cultivated on a small scale. Its distribution extends from the southern part of Scandinavia, to the eastern part of Russia and to the Mediterranean regions in the south. Outside Europe, it occurs as a neophyte in Morocco, North America, and New Zealand. However, it has been reported that more recently the natural occurrence in some countries, such as England or Germany, has declined. In certain parts of Germany, the wild form is found so rarely that the plant is considered an endangered species. In Germany, the plant is classified to occur naturally in two different nutrient-rich biotops; either in the alpine region or at ruderal sites, such as wall bases or corners of buildings. In these ruderal sites, the occurrence has declined more than in alpine regions and there, the plant is, thus, considered to be more endangered.

== Ecology ==
The plant is host to several moths. Moths that are often found in interaction with the plant are for example Pelurga comitata, commonly called dark spinach, or Eupithecia simpliciata, also called plain pug. Both moths belong to the family Geometridae. However, representatives of other families of moths, such as Noctuidae or Sphingidae have been spotted on the plant. Being host plant to insects can have dual effects; on the one hand, the insects can act as pollinators and, thus, can be beneficial for the plant, on the other hand, the larva of some of these insects are known to feed on the plant.

== Uses ==
=== Edible value ===
Good-King-Henry is usually cultivated due to its potential as an alternative food resource. Cropping can begin in spring. Some of the new shoots can be thinned out as they appear (usually from mid-spring to early summer) and cooked like asparagus. The shoots are cut just under the ground once they reach a height of 12 centimetres (5 in).

All cutting should then cease so that shoots are allowed to develop. Only if the harvesting of the shoots stops after a few weeks, the plant can recover and form leaves, which is the part of the plant that is most traditionally used as a food supply. The succulent, triangular leaves may be harvested a few at a time until the end of August and eaten raw or cooked like spinach. They are best when they are young, as older foliage tends to become fibrous. Moreover, they may develop a more pronounced bitter taste, and the oxalic acid content of larger leaves that are in a later developmental stage is higher than in small, young leaves.

The flower buds can be cooked as well. They are sometimes considered a gourmet delicacy, though they are quite small, making the collection of a significant quantity a time-consuming task. Usually, they are steamed in a similar way to broccoli.

The rhizomes can be crushed and used to make confectionery that tastes like peanut butter.

Though small, the seeds are relatively easy to collect from the mature plant. Due to the saponin content in the seeds, Good-King-Henry has been used traditionally by hunting tribes to stun fish by placing it into streams or lakes. However, after the soaking and rinsing process to remove saponins, the seeds are safe to use. They can be ground into a flour which can then be incorporated into bread.

=== Dye plant ===
Next to its use as food, the plant can also be used as a dye, producing some green/golden colours.

=== Medicinal applications ===
Moreover, its potential in medicinal applications has also been investigated. More recently it has been shown that flavonoids derived from Good-King-Henry exhibit a neuroprotective effect. It is also potentially used as an emollient, vermifuge and gentle laxative. In folk medicine the plant has been used to treat skin inflammations, abscesses but also anemia.

== Cultivation ==
To ensure successful germination the seeds need a period of cold stratification. Usually 9 weeks at 4°C (40°F) is sufficient. Once stratified they can be germinated at 20°C (70°F). For this reason, sowing in spring is recommended. The difficulty of germination might be due to the thicker seed coat, which increases with higher altitudes. While these plants thrive best in fertile, humus-rich ground, they are highly adaptable and will generally succeed in most soil types and conditions. However, they prefer partially shaded spots. If these conditions are met, it is assumed that thirty plants produce enough for four people. They are exceptionally easy to manage because they exhibit a clumping growth habit (meaning their spread is limited), and their root system consists of a deep, descending taproot similar to a carrot. Moreover, there are no pests known that cause considerable harm to the plant. As it originates from the Alps, it can also tolerate very low temperatures. Due to these reasons it is a promising crop for the future. Up to now, there are only a few cultivars available, since it is mostly grown for domestic use. Nevertheless, it has the potential to be grown in monocultures if the seed proves to have sufficient market value. In this way the plant could contribute to integrate more perennial crops into agricultural systems which would lead to enhanced sustainability.

== Economic aspects ==
Good-King-Henry has not been incorporated into large scale markets. Because of this, it may face difficulties competing for a market niche already dominated by mass-produced leafy greens such as spinach. This difficulty has been documented in other leafy green alternative crops, such as Chaya. In Chaya the primary inhibiting factors towards market growth were low demand due to a lack of consumer awareness and low profitability over traditional crops. These problems would be substantial hurdles for Good-King-Henry as well to ever reach wider markets.

Good-King-Henry could, however, contribute to small-scale local markets in the same way Chaya does. Seeds are readily available online, so while there is no mass market for Good-King-Henry as a leafy green crop, there is a niche smaller market for it as a garden plant.

== Gallery ==
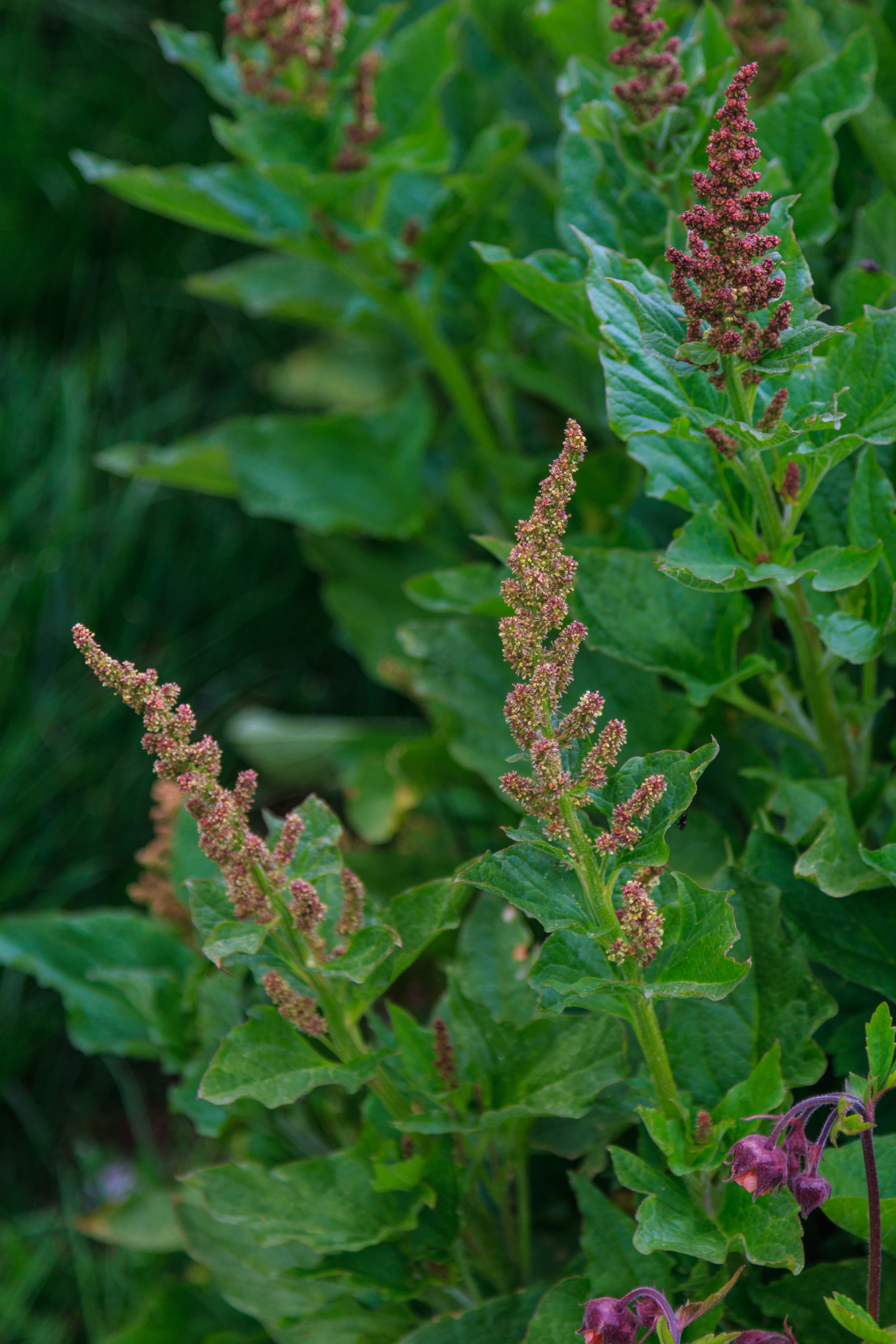

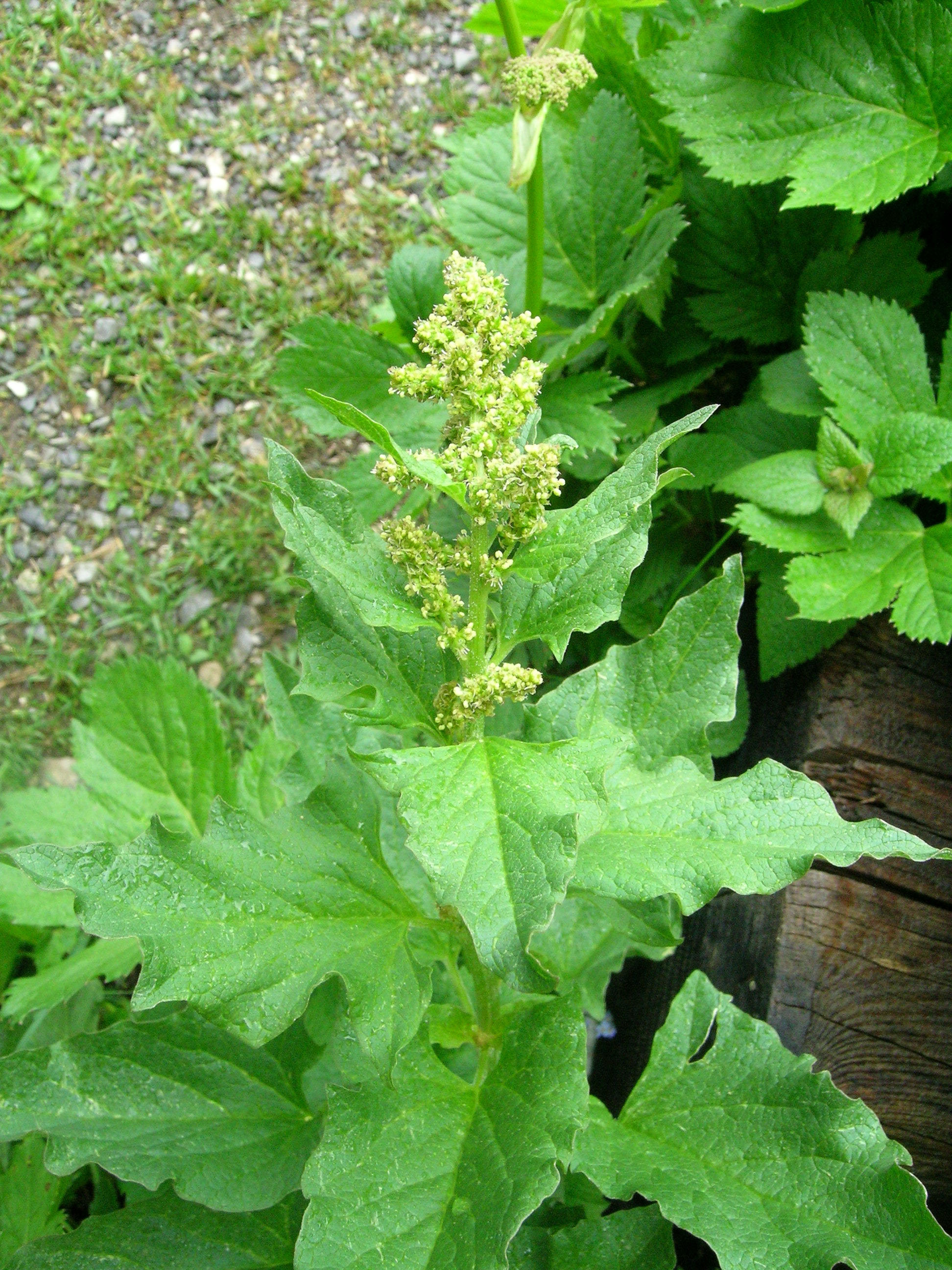

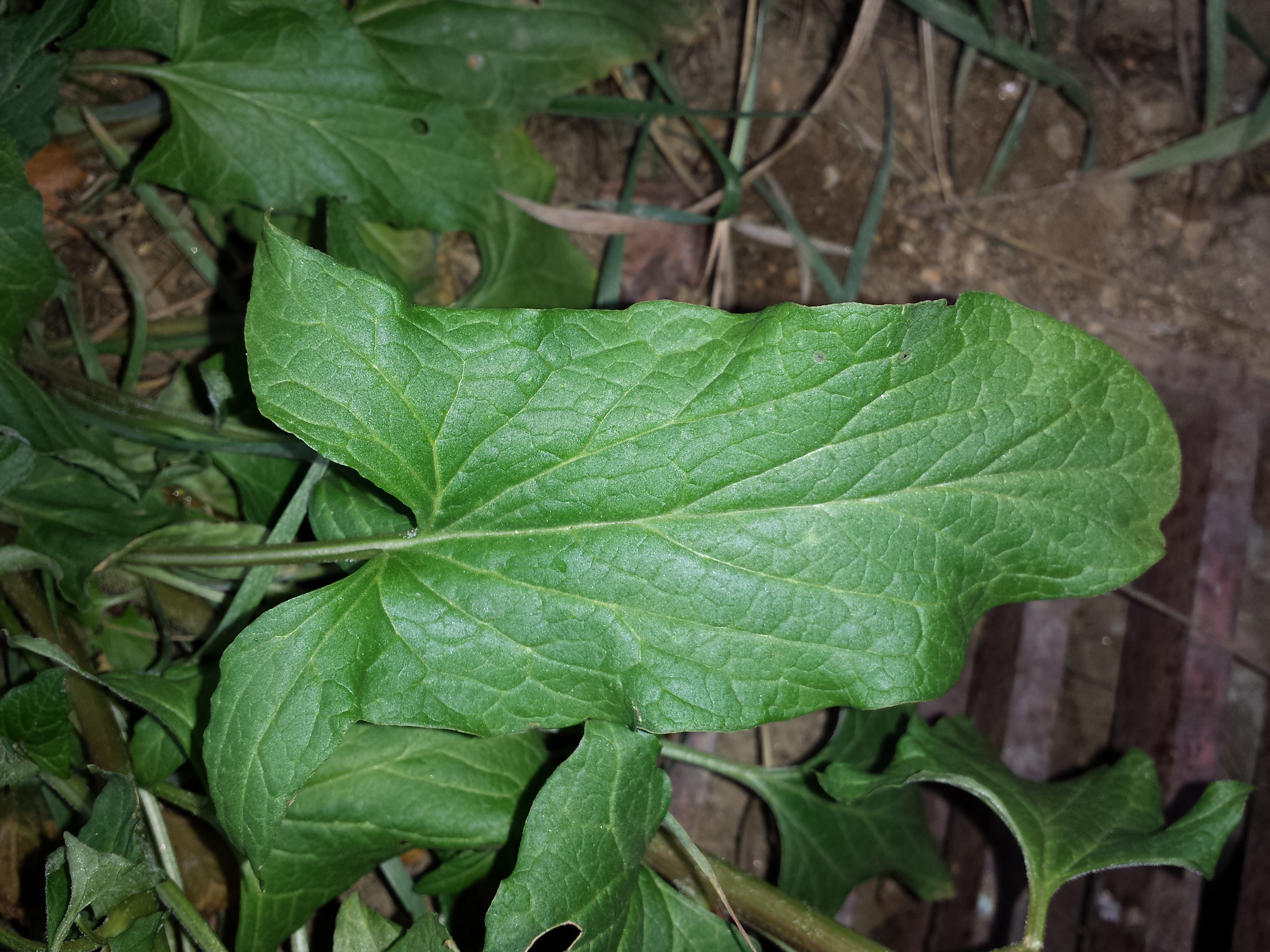
