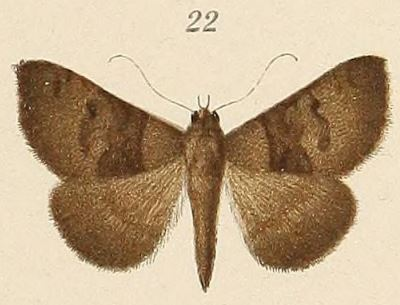

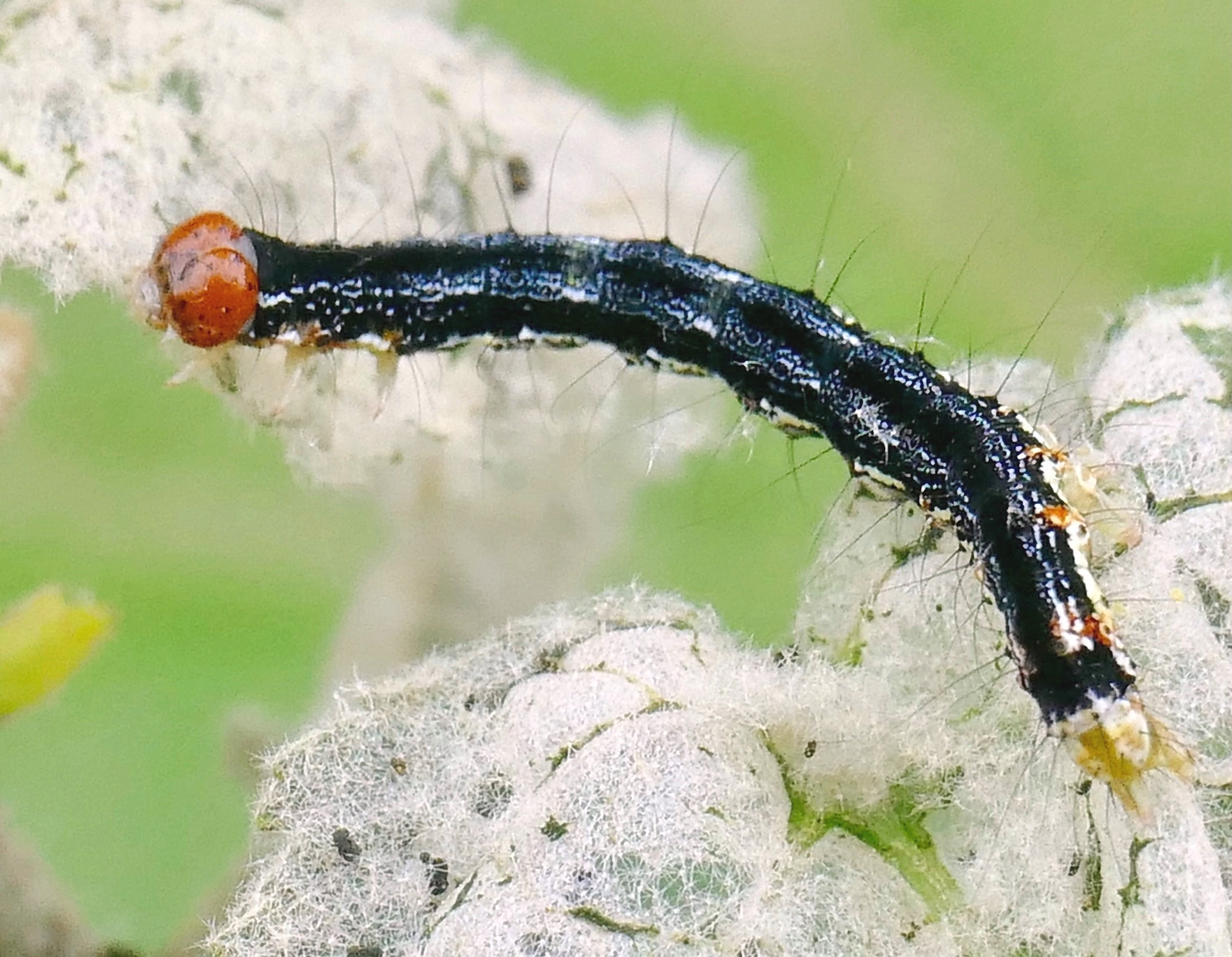
- The imago of A. virbioides (above) and Amyna sp. caterpillar feeding on Croton

Scientific classification
- Kingdom: Animalia
- Phylum: Arthropoda
- Class: Insecta
- Order: Lepidoptera
- Superfamily: Noctuoidea
- Family: Noctuidae
- Subfamily: Bagisarinae
- Genus: Amyna; Guenée in Boisduval & Guenée, 1852

Synonyms
- Berresa Walker, [1859]; Ilattia Walker, [1859]; Lochia Walker, 1865; Stridova Walker, 1869; Pteraetholix Grote, 1873; Chytoryza Grote, 1876; Hesperimorpha Saalmüller, 1880; Amynodes Warren, 1913; Formosamyna Strand, 1920; Niphosticta Turner, 1936; Trilophia Turner, 1943; Hurworthia Nye, 1975

= Amyna =

Genus of moths

Amyna is a genus of moths of the family Noctuidae erected by Achille Guenée in 1852.

== Description ==
Their thoraxes are tuftless. The abdomen is slender and tapering to a point with the slight dorsal tufts. Palpi more slender and reaching above vertex of head. Forewings are shorter and broader, where the costa more arched towards apex.

== Species ==
- Amyna acuta Berio, 1960
- Amyna albiloba (Warren, 1913)
- Amyna amplificans (Walker, 1858)
- Amyna apicalis (Walker, 1865)
- Amyna apicipuncta (Turner, 1936)
- Amyna aroa (Bethune-Baker, 1906)
- Amyna aurea Lucas, 1898
- Amyna auriculata (Turner, 1903)
- Amyna axis (Guenée, 1852)
- Amyna bullula (Grote, 1873)
- Amyna crocosticta Hampson, 1910
- Amyna distigmata (Hampson, 1896)
- Amyna flavirena Holloway, 1979
- Amyna frontalis Strand, 1920
- Amyna glaucoptera Hampson, 1910
- Amyna griseola (Snellen, 1872)
- Amyna indignata (Wileman & South, 1921)
- Amyna insularum Schaus, 1923
- Amyna leucoptera Hampson, 1910
- Amyna leucostriga Hampson, 1910
- Amyna magnifoveata Hampson, 1918
- Amyna modesta (Warren, 1913)
- Amyna monocampta Hampson, 1910
- Amyna natalica Pinhey, 1975
- Amyna natalis (Walker, [1859])
- Amyna onthodes (Lower, 1903)
- Amyna padanga (Swinhoe, 1919)
- Amyna punctum (Fabricius, 1794)
- Amyna renalis (Moore, 1882)
- Amyna rubrirena Hampson, 1918
- Amyna ruptirena Hampson, 1910
- Amyna spilonota Lower, 1903
- Amyna spissa (Warren, 1913)
- Amyna stellata Butler, 1878
- Amyna virbioides (Pagenstecher, 1907)
