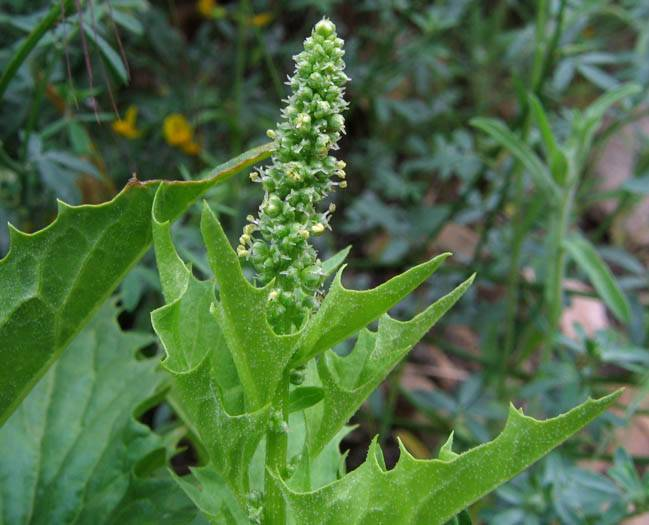

Scientific classification
- Kingdom: Plantae
- Clade: Tracheophytes
- Clade: Angiosperms
- Clade: Eudicots
- Order: Caryophyllales
- Family: Amaranthaceae
- Genus: Blitum
- Species: B. californicum

Binomial name
- Blitum californicum S.Wats.

Synonyms
- Chenopodium californicum (S.Watson) S.Watson

= Blitum californicum =

Species of flowering plant

Blitum californicum (syn. Chenopodium californicum) is a species of flowering plant in the amaranth family known by the common names California goosefoot and (ambiguously) "Indian lettuce".

It is native to California and Baja California where it can be found below 2,000 metres (6,600 ft) in open areas in a number of habitat types, such as grassland, chaparral, desert, and montane.

== Description ==
This is a perennial herb producing a number of decumbent to erect stems which approach a meter in maximum height when growing upright. It grows from a thick, fleshy caudex. When there are many stems the plant may form a clump or mat. The leaves grow on long petioles and are triangular or arrowhead-shaped and up to about 10 centimeters long. The edges are deeply and sharply toothed.

The inflorescences are spherical clusters dotted along an inflorescence-like spike. Each dense cluster contains several rounded flowers, with each flower a series of flat lobes covering the developing fruit. The fruit is a reddish utricle layered around the surface of the seed.

== Uses ==
California goosefoot is used for a variety of purposes by Native Americans including use as a medicine and a source of soap, in addition to the use of the seeds for flour and the leaves and shoots as a cooked vegetable.
