= Bagisara praecelsa =

Scientific classification
- Domain: Eukaryota
- Kingdom: Animalia
- Phylum: Arthropoda
- Class: Insecta
- Order: Lepidoptera
- Superfamily: Noctuoidea
- Family: Noctuidae
- Genus: Bagisara
- Species: B. praecelsa

Binomial name
- Bagisara praecelsa Ferguson, 1997

Species of moth

Bagisara praecelsa is a moth of the family Noctuidae first described by Alexander Douglas Campbell Ferguson in 1997. It is found in southern North America from Texas to northern Mexico.

The wingspan is about 30 mm.
