= Amyna apicalis =

Scientific classification
- Kingdom: Animalia
- Phylum: Arthropoda
- Clade: Pancrustacea
- Class: Insecta
- Order: Lepidoptera
- Superfamily: Noctuoidea
- Family: Noctuidae
- Genus: Amyna
- Species: A. apicalis

Binomial name
- Amyna apicalis (Walker, 1865)

Synonyms
- Lochia apicalis Walker, 1865

Species of moth

Amyna apicalis is a moth of the family Noctuidae. It is found in Queensland, Australia.
