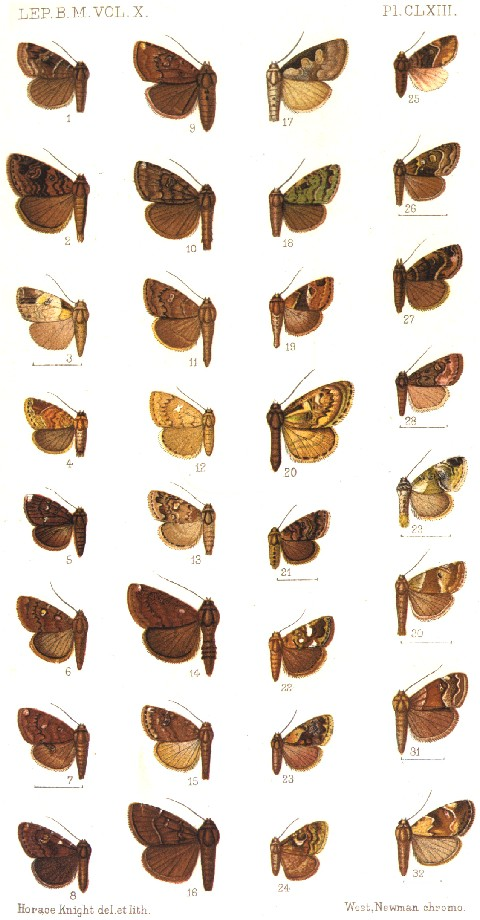
- A. amplificans is #14 (2nd column, 3rd row up)

Scientific classification
- Kingdom: Animalia
- Phylum: Arthropoda
- Class: Insecta
- Order: Lepidoptera
- Superfamily: Noctuoidea
- Family: Noctuidae
- Genus: Amyna
- Species: A. amplificans

Binomial name
- Amyna amplificans (Walker, 1858)

Synonyms
- Celaena amplificans Walker, 1858; Hadena impedita Walker, 1858

= Amyna amplificans =

Species of moth

Amyna amplificans is a moth in the family Noctuidae first described by Francis Walker in 1858. It is found from Guatemala and Costa Rica and Venezuela. A single specimen was collected in the Huachuca Mountains in south-eastern Arizona.
