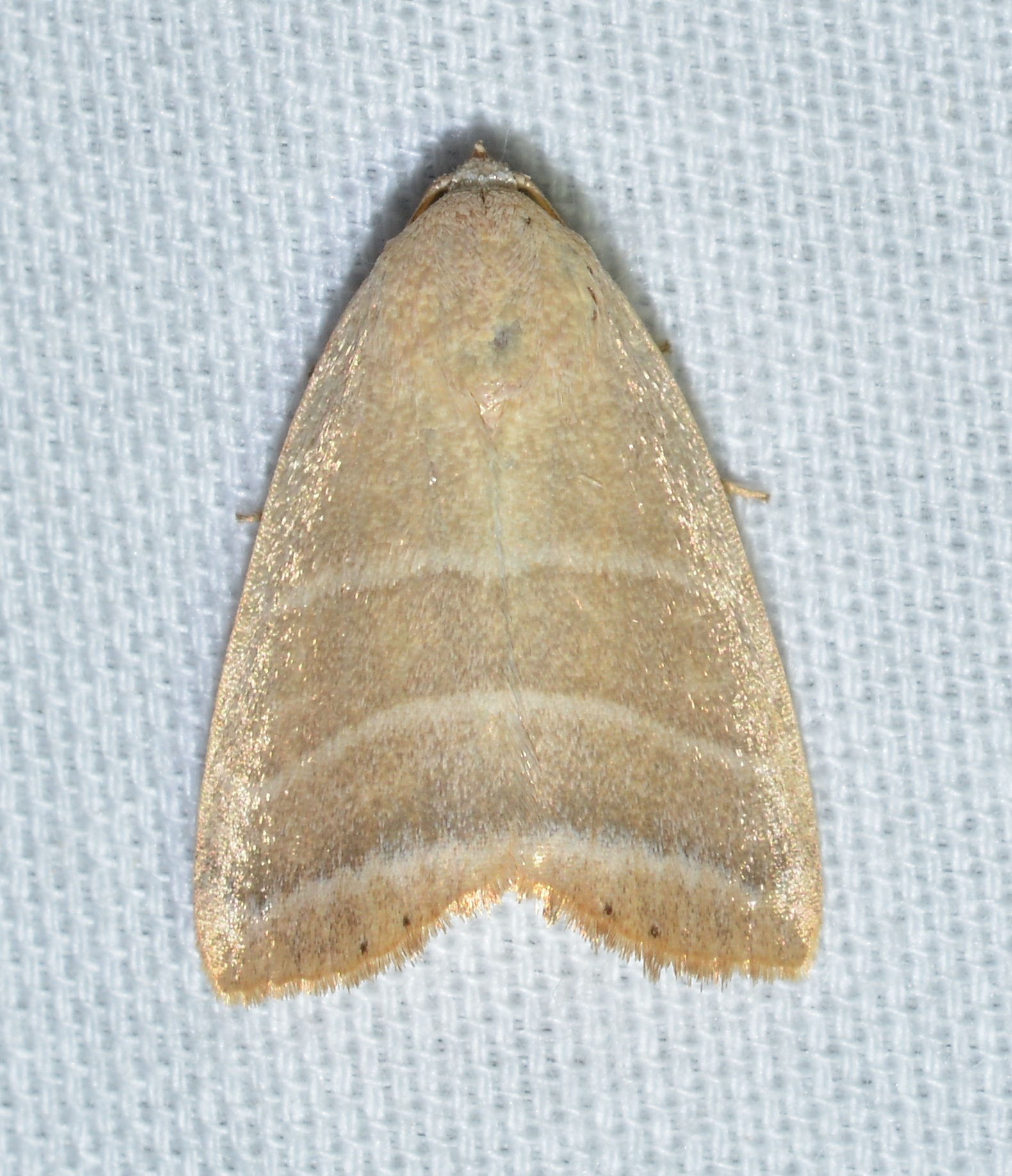

Scientific classification
- Domain: Eukaryota
- Kingdom: Animalia
- Phylum: Arthropoda
- Class: Insecta
- Order: Lepidoptera
- Superfamily: Noctuoidea
- Family: Noctuidae
- Genus: Bagisara
- Species: B. rectifascia

Binomial name
- Bagisara rectifascia (Grote, 1874)

= Bagisara rectifascia =

Species of moth

Bagisara rectifascia, the straight lined mallow moth or three-lined bagisera moth, is a species of moth in the family Noctuidae (the owlet moths). The species was first described by Augustus Radcliffe Grote in 1874. It is found in North America.

The MONA or Hodges number for Bagisara rectifascia is 9169.
