= Spinacia tetrandra =

Scientific classification
- Kingdom: Plantae
- Clade: Embryophytes
- Clade: Tracheophytes
- Clade: Angiosperms
- Clade: Eudicots
- Order: Caryophyllales
- Family: Amaranthaceae
- Genus: Spinacia
- Species: S. tetrandra

Binomial name
- Spinacia tetrandra Steven ex M.Bieb.

Synonyms
- Spinacia minor K.Koch; Spinacia oleracea var. tetrandra (Steven ex M.Bieb.) Alef.; Spinacia tetrandra f. cyclostegia Bornm.; Spinacia tetrandra var. subspinosa Aellen

Species of plant

Spinacia tetrandra is a species of flowering plant in the family Amaranthaceae. It is native to eastern Anatolia, the Caucasus, the Levant, Iraq, and western Iran. An annual, it is a crop wild relative of spinach (Spinacia oleracea), having diverged from it some 6.3 million years ago.
