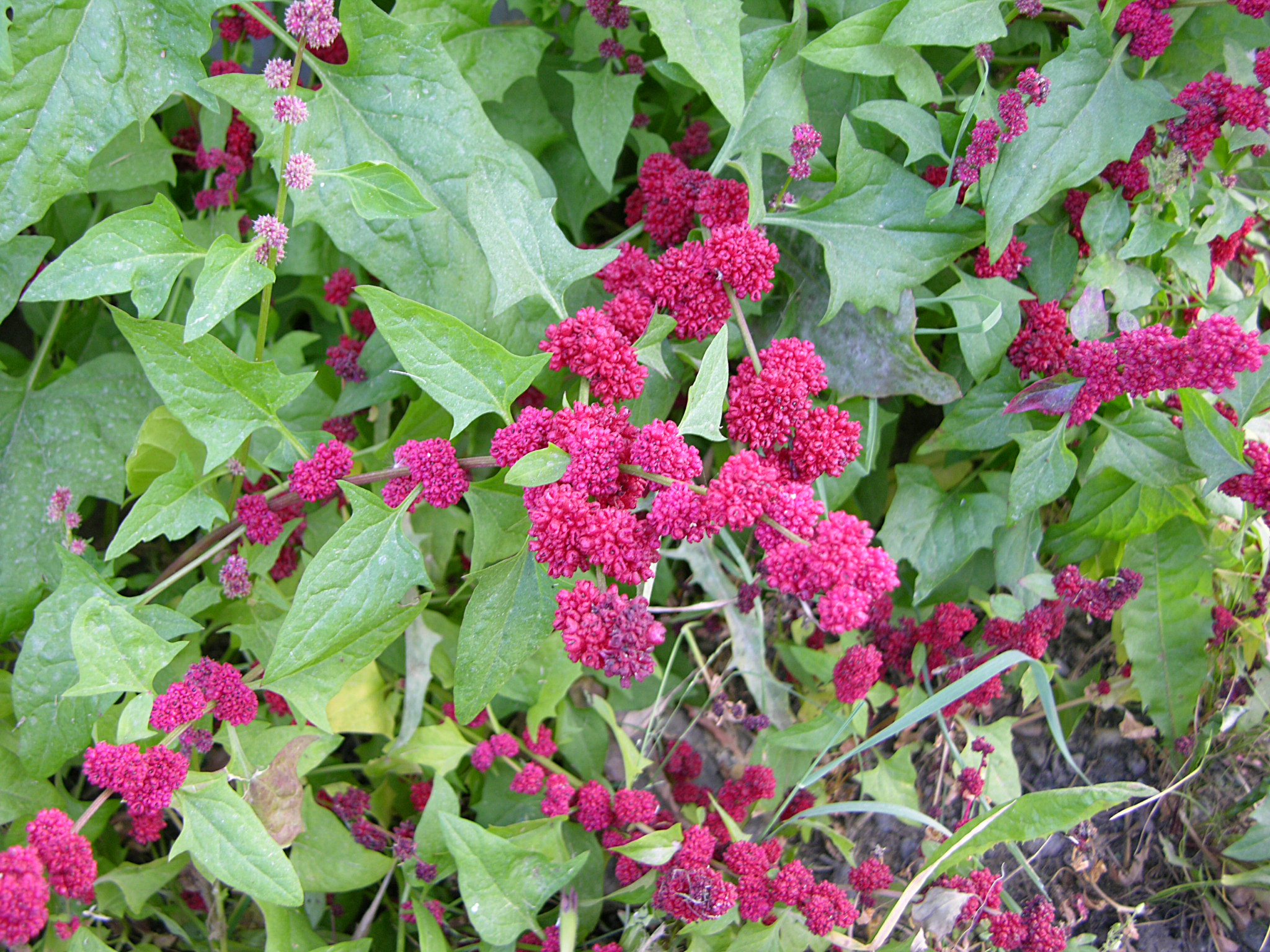
- strawberry blite (Blitum capitatum)

Scientific classification
- Kingdom: Plantae
- Clade: Tracheophytes
- Clade: Angiosperms
- Clade: Eudicots
- Order: Caryophyllales
- Family: Amaranthaceae
- Subfamily: Chenopodioideae
- Tribe: Anserineae
- Genus: Blitum; L.

Synonyms
- Agathophytum Moq. (1834), nom. superfl.; Anserina Dumort (1827); Carocarpidium S.C.Sand. & G.L.Chu (2017); Chenopodium sect. Agathophytum (T. Nees) Benth. & Hook. f.; Chenopodium sect. Atriplicina Aellen; Chenopodium sect. Blitum (L.) Benth. & Hook f.; Chenopodium subg. Blitum (L.) Hiitonen; Chenopodium [unranked] Californica Standl.; Chenopodium sect. Eublitum; Monolepis Schrad. (1830); Morocarpus Boehmer (1760), nom. superfl.; Orthosporum subg. Agathophytum T. Nees; Scleroblitum Ulbr. (1934)

= Blitum =

Genus of flowering plants

Blitum is a genus of flowering plants in the amaranth family Amaranthaceae, subfamily Chenopodioideae. It is closely related to genus Spinacia. Its 12 species were traditionally placed in the genera Chenopodium, Monolepis, or Scleroblitum. The species of genus Blitum occur in Asia, Europe, North Africa, the Americas, and Australia.

== Description ==
The species in genus Blitum are non-aromatic annual or perennial herbs. They are glabrous, or sometimes covered with stipitate vesicular hairs, young plants may be sticky. From the base emerge several erect, ascending or prostrate stems, that are unbranched or sparsely branched.

The alternate leaves consist of a petiole and a simple blade. The basal leaves are often long-petiolate and forming a rosette. The leaf blade is thin oder slightly fleshy, and may be triangular, triangular-hastate, triangular-lanceolate, or spathulate, with entire to dentate margins.

The inflorescences consist of spicately arranged compact glomerules of flowers, ebracteate or in the axils of small leaf-like bracts. Flowers are bisexual or pistillate. They contain (1) 3-5 herbaceous, unkeeled perianth segments, connate only at base or nearly to the middle, sometimes missing; a circle of 1-5 stamens; and an ovary with 2-4 stigmas.

In fruit, the perianth becomes either succulent or dry and hard. The pericarp is membranous and usually adhering to the vertically orientated, broadly ovate to orbicular seed. The seed coat is dark brown to black, its surface can be dull, almost smooth, slightly striate, rugulose, or reticulate.

== Systematics and distribution ==
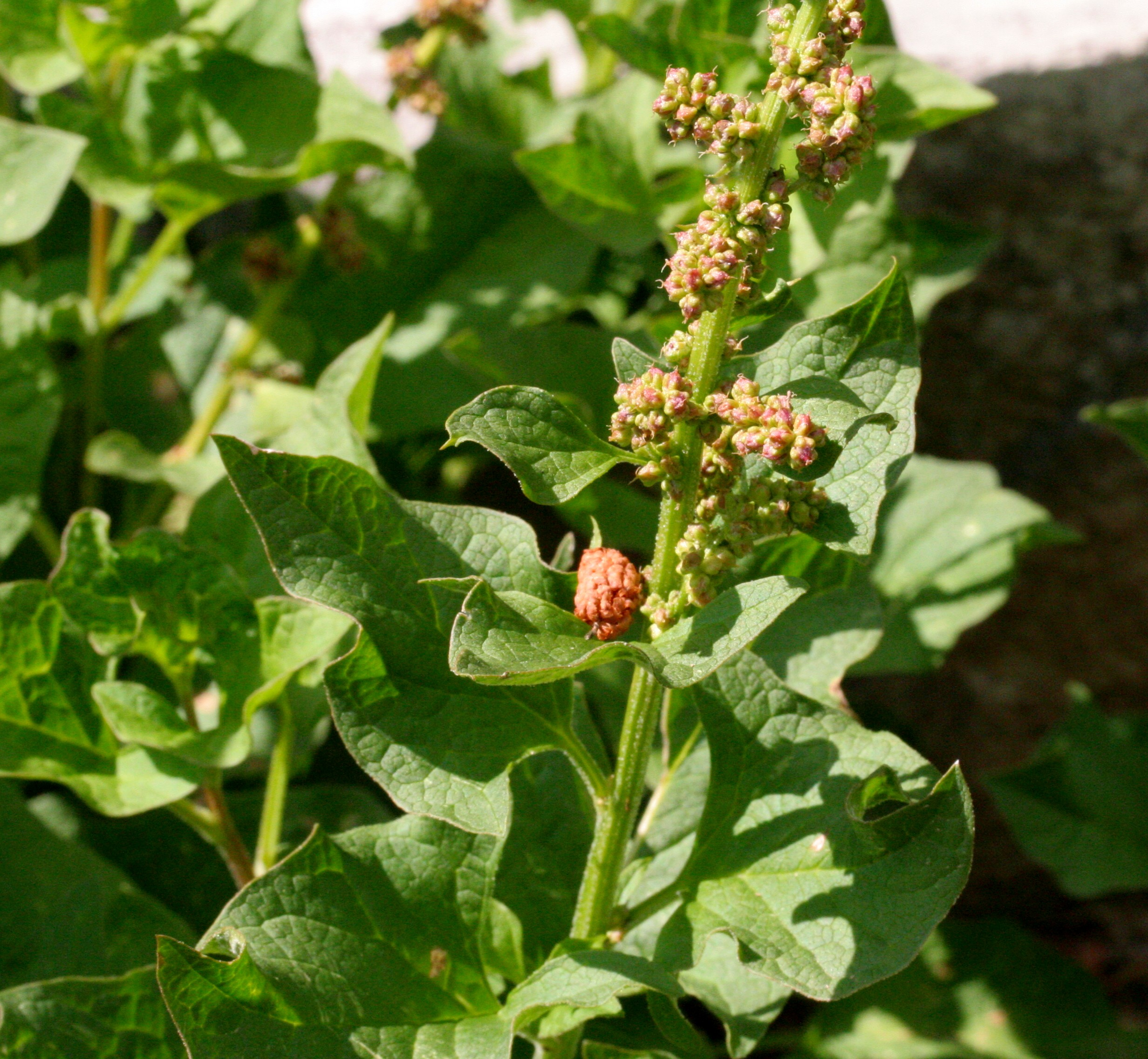
Good king henry (Blitum bonus-henricus)

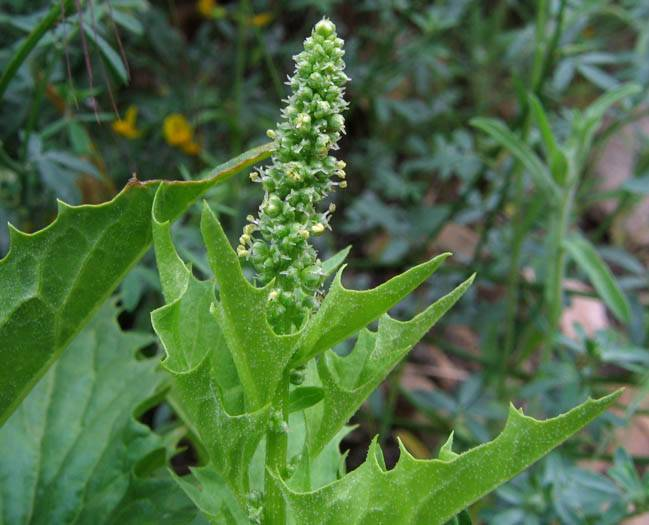
California goosefoot (Blitum californicum)

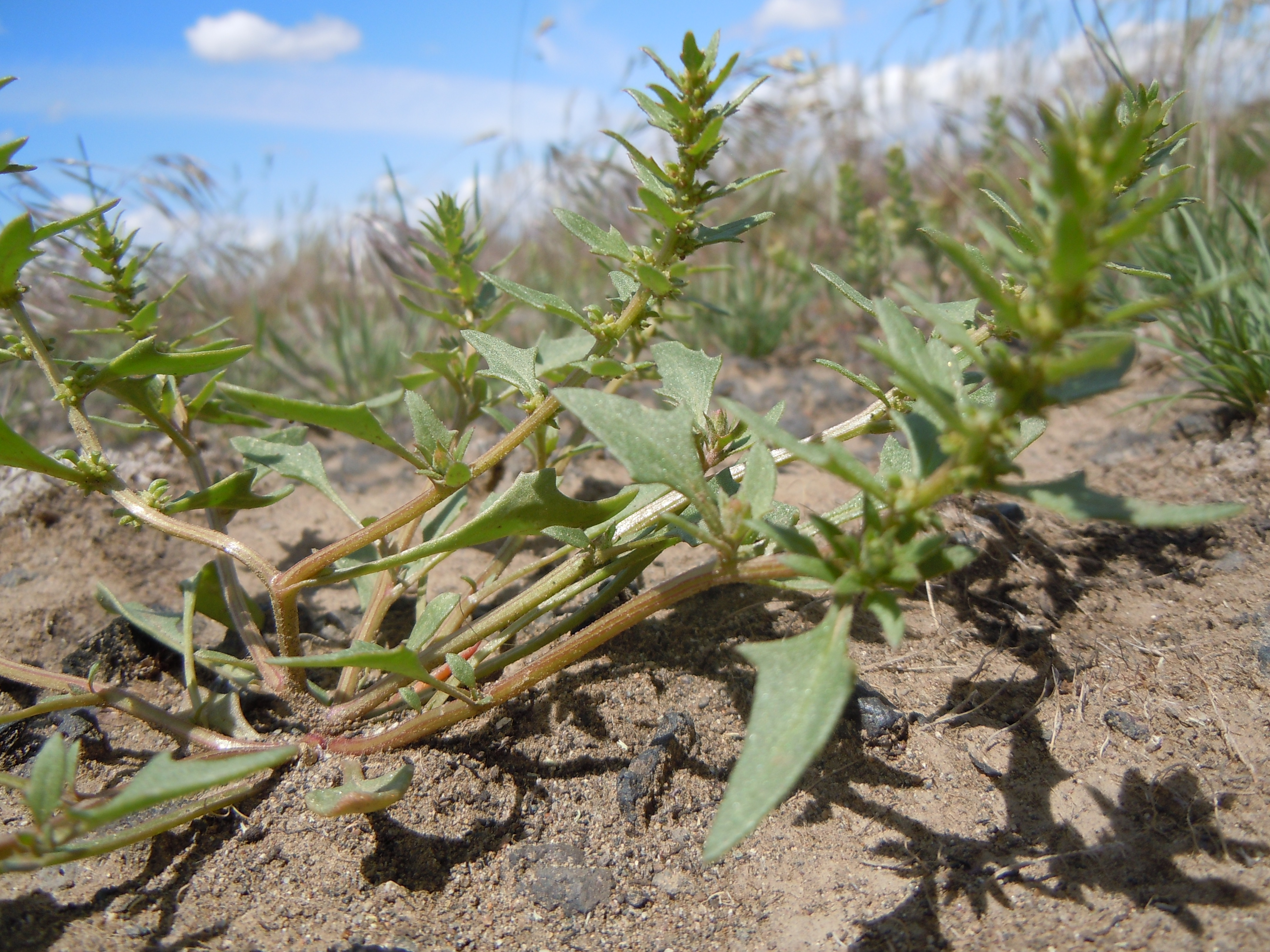
Nuttall's povertyweed (Blitum nuttallianum)

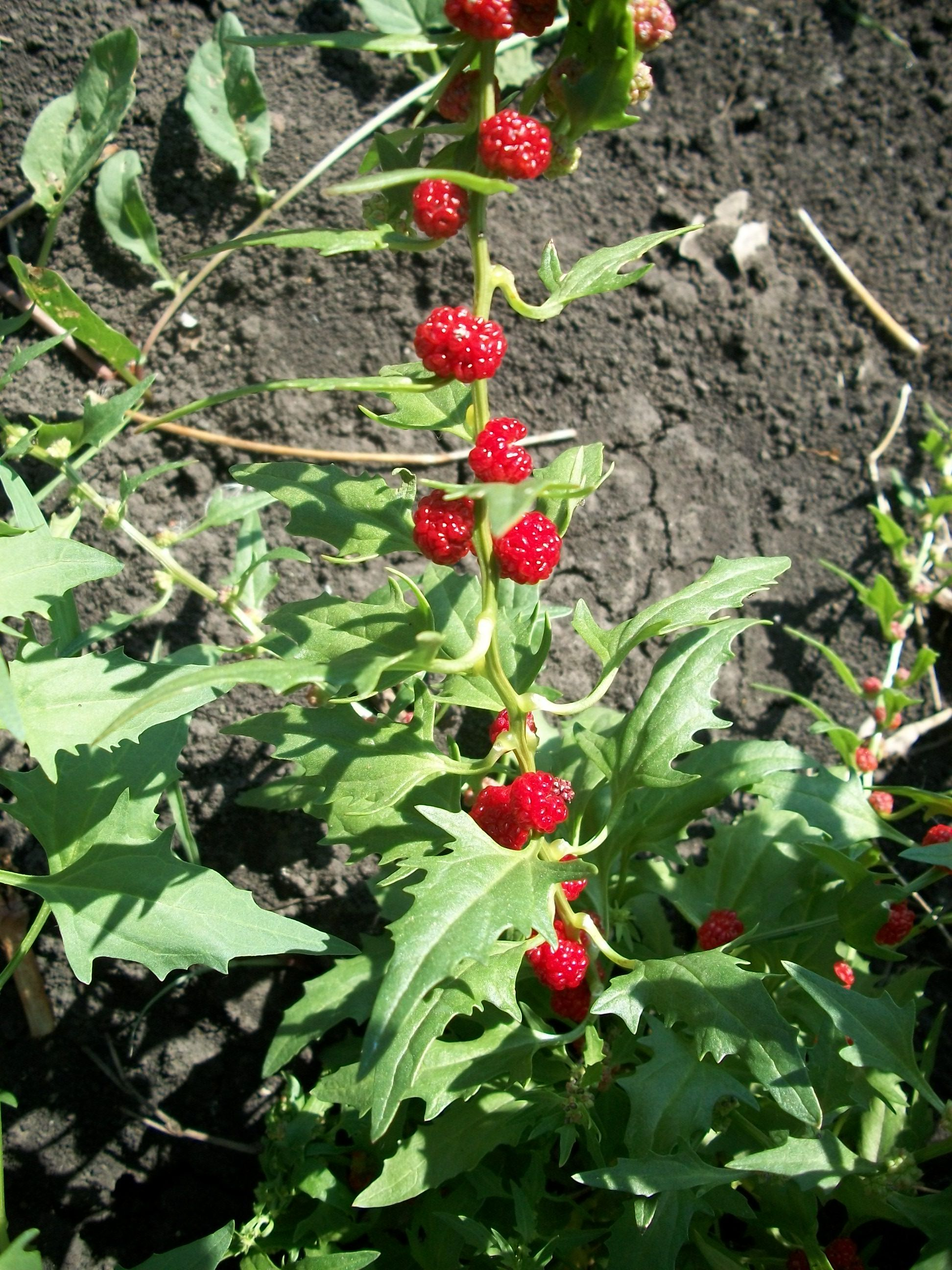
leafy goosefoot (Blitum virgatum)

The genus Blitum was first described in 1753 by Carl Linnaeus in Species Plantarum, Vol. 2, p. 4. Type species is Blitum capitatum L. Since the second half of the 19th century, Blitum species were grouped into genus Chenopodium and treated as a subgenus, Chenopodium subgenus Blitum. Phylogenetic research revealed, that these species, as well as species of Monolepis and Scleroblitum, are more closely related to Spinacia, and do not really belong to Chenopodium. Therefore, Fuentes-Bazan et al. (2012) separated them as own genus Blitum. Together with Spinacia, the genus Blitum was grouped into tribe Anserineae (syn. Spinacieae).

== Species ==
Blitum includes 12 species.

- Blitum antarcticum Hook.f. – southern Chile and Argentina
- Blitum asiaticum (Fisch. & C.A.Mey.) S.Fuentes, Uotila & Borsch (syn. Monolepis asiatica Fisch. & C.A.Mey.) – occurring in northeastern Russia in Sakha and the region of Khabarovsk.
- Blitum atriplicinum F.Muell. (syn. Scleroblitum atriplicinum (F. Muell.) Ulbr.) – distributed in Australia.
- Blitum bonus-henricus (L.) Rchb. (syn. Chenopodium bonus-henricus L.) – Good king henry: distributed in Europe.
- Blitum californicum S.Watson (syn. Chenopodium californicum (S.Watson) S.Watson) – California goosefoot: in California and Mexico.
- Blitum capitatum L. (syn. Chenopodium capitatum (L.) Ambrosi) – strawberry blite: in North America, naturalized in Europe.
- Blitum korshinskyi Litv. (syn. Chenopodium korshinskyi (Litv.) Minkw) – in Tadzhikistan.
- Blitum litwinowii (Paulsen) S.Fuentes, Uotila & Borsch (syn. Monolepis litwinowii Paulsen, Chenopodium litwinowii (Paulsen) Uotila) – in Afghanistan and Tadzhikistan.
- Blitum nuttallianum Schult. (syn. Monolepis nuttalliana (Schult.) Greene or Chenopodium trifidum Trev.) – Nuttall's povertyweed: in North America and Argentina.
- Blitum petiolare Link (syn. Chenopodium exsuccum (C. Loscos) Uotila) – in North Africa, Portugal and Spain, naturalized in Sweden.
- Blitum × tkalcsicsii (H.Melzer) Mosyakin – Italy
- Blitum venetum Iamonico, Argenti, Sciuto & M.A.Wolf – northeastern Italy
- Blitum virgatum L. (syn. Chenopodium foliosum Asch.) – leafy goosefoot: in Europe and Asia, naturalized in North America.

=== Formerly placed here ===
- Neomonolepis spathulata (A. Gray) Sukhor. (as Blitum spathulatum (A. Gray) S.Fuentes, Uotila & Borsch)
