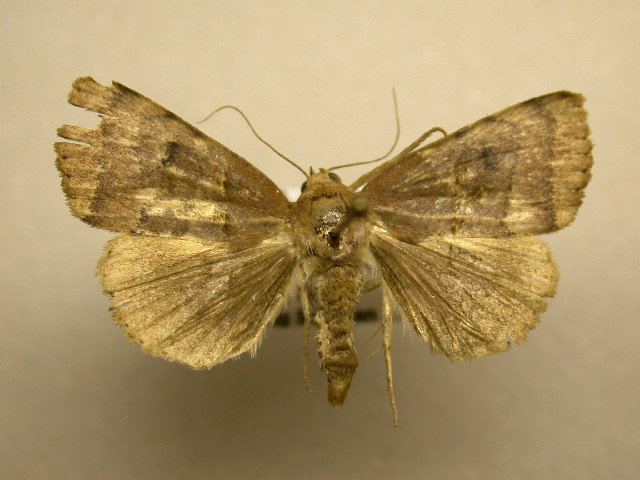

Scientific classification
- Domain: Eukaryota
- Kingdom: Animalia
- Phylum: Arthropoda
- Class: Insecta
- Order: Lepidoptera
- Superfamily: Noctuoidea
- Family: Noctuidae
- Genus: Bagisara
- Species: B. brouana

Binomial name
- Bagisara brouana Ferguson, 1997

= Bagisara brouana =

Species of moth

Bagisara brouana is a moth of the family Noctuidae first described by Alexander Douglas Campbell Ferguson in 1997. It is found in the US states of Louisiana and Mississippi.

It has a very limited distribution, which might indicate it feeds on a single genus or even species of plant which also has a limited distribution.
