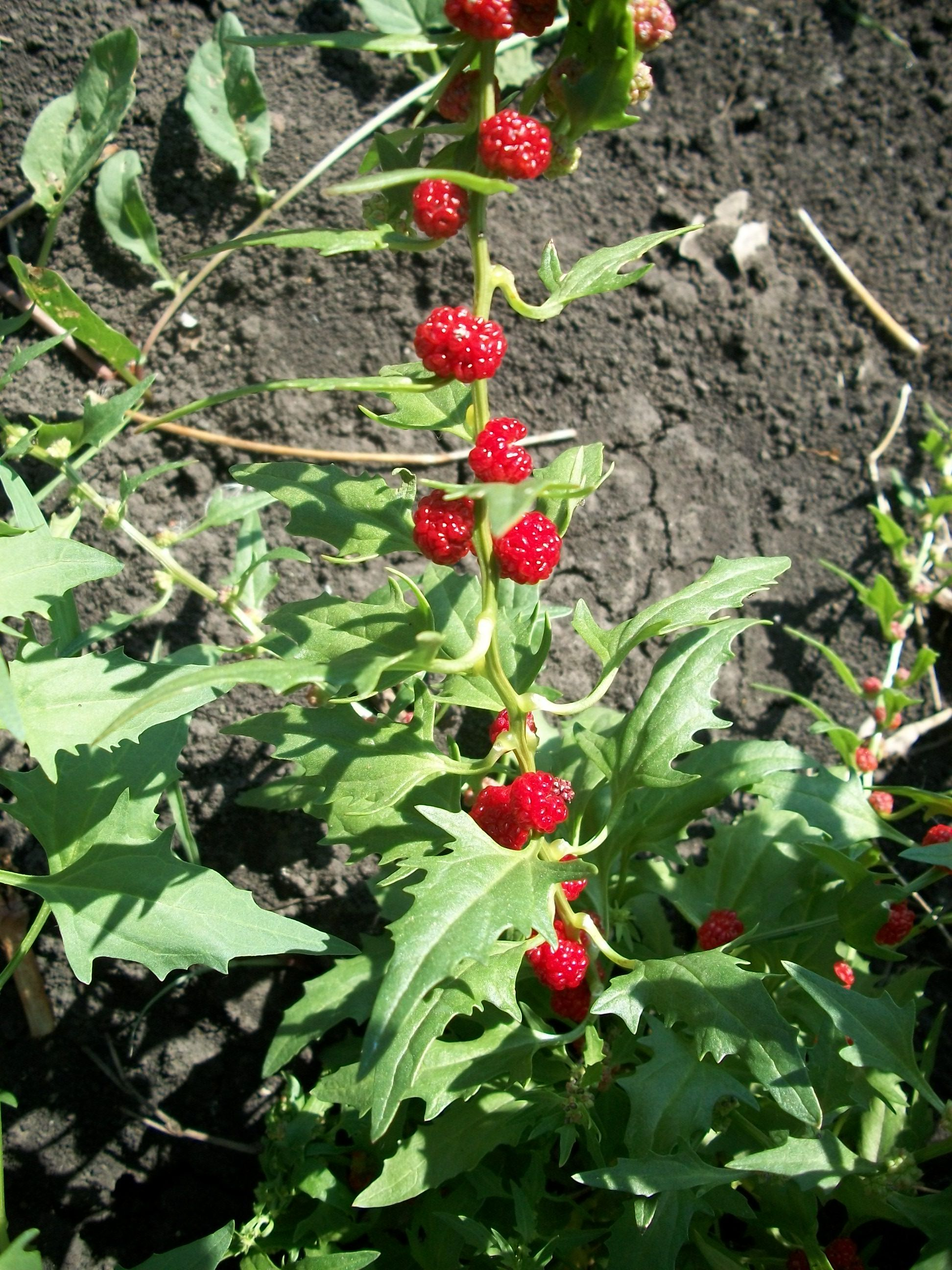

Scientific classification
- Kingdom: Plantae
- Clade: Tracheophytes
- Clade: Angiosperms
- Clade: Eudicots
- Order: Caryophyllales
- Family: Amaranthaceae
- Genus: Blitum
- Species: B. virgatum

Binomial name
- Blitum virgatum L.

Synonyms
- Chenopodium capitatum var. parvicapitatum Welsh; Chenopodium foliosum Asch.; Chenopodium virgatum (L.) Ambrosi (non Thunb.); Morocarpus foliosus Moench

= Blitum virgatum =

Species of flowering plant

Blitum virgatum, (syn. Chenopodium foliosum) is a species of flowering plant in the amaranth family known by the common name leafy goosefoot. It is native to Eurasia. It can be found on other continents as an introduced species, growing as a minor weed in disturbed habitats and cultivated land.

== Description ==
This is an erect annual herb growing to a maximum height just over half a meter. The leaves are 1 to 4 centimeters long and may be toothed or smooth-edged. The inflorescences are small spherical clusters of tiny reddish-green flowers wrapped around fruits which are about a millimeter wide.

== Uses ==
The leaves and inflorescences are edible and resemble spinach; the plant was grown as a leaf vegetable in Europe in former times, and there is some recent interest in its cultivation again.
