= Bagisara oula =

Scientific classification
- Kingdom: Animalia
- Phylum: Arthropoda
- Class: Insecta
- Order: Lepidoptera
- Superfamily: Noctuoidea
- Family: Noctuidae
- Genus: Bagisara
- Species: B. oula

Binomial name
- Bagisara oula Dyar, 1913

Species of moth

Bagisara oula is a species of moth in the family Noctuidae (the owlet moths). It is found in North America.

The MONA or Hodges number for Bagisara oula is 9173.
