= Bagisara tristicta =

Scientific classification
- Kingdom: Animalia
- Phylum: Arthropoda
- Class: Insecta
- Order: Lepidoptera
- Superfamily: Noctuoidea
- Family: Noctuidae
- Genus: Bagisara
- Species: B. tristicta

Binomial name
- Bagisara tristicta (Hampson, 1898)

Species of moth

Bagisara tristicta is a species of moth in the family Noctuidae (the owlet moths).

The MONA or Hodges number for Bagisara tristicta is 9176.
