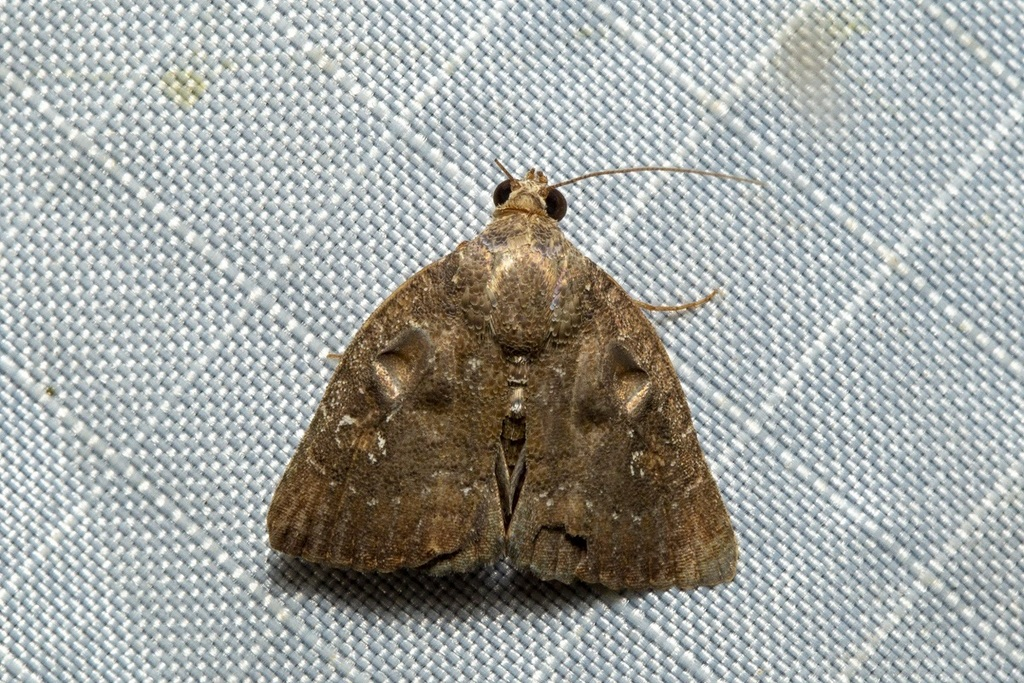

Scientific classification
- Kingdom: Animalia
- Phylum: Arthropoda
- Class: Insecta
- Order: Lepidoptera
- Superfamily: Noctuoidea
- Family: Noctuidae
- Genus: Amyna
- Species: A. natalis

Binomial name
- Amyna natalis (Walker, 1858)

Synonyms
- Berresa turpis Walker, 1858; Berresa natalis Walker, 1858; Miana palpalis Walker, 1865; Mesotrosta abyssa Snellen, 1880; Berresa meeki Bethune-Baker, 1906

= Amyna natalis =

Ilima moth

Species of moth

Amyna natalis, the ilima moth, is a moth of the family Noctuidae. It was first described by Francis Walker in 1858. It is widespread from tropical Asia into northern Australia. It is an introduced species in Hawaii, where it is found on Oahu.

== Description ==
The wingspan of the male is 20 mm and of the female is 26 mm. Body dull brown. Forewings with indistinct sub-basal, antemedial, postmedial and sub-marginal single waved lines with a few grey scales on them. Reniform represented by a small spot. Abdomen and hindwings are fuscous. Abdomen with an indistinct postmedial line.

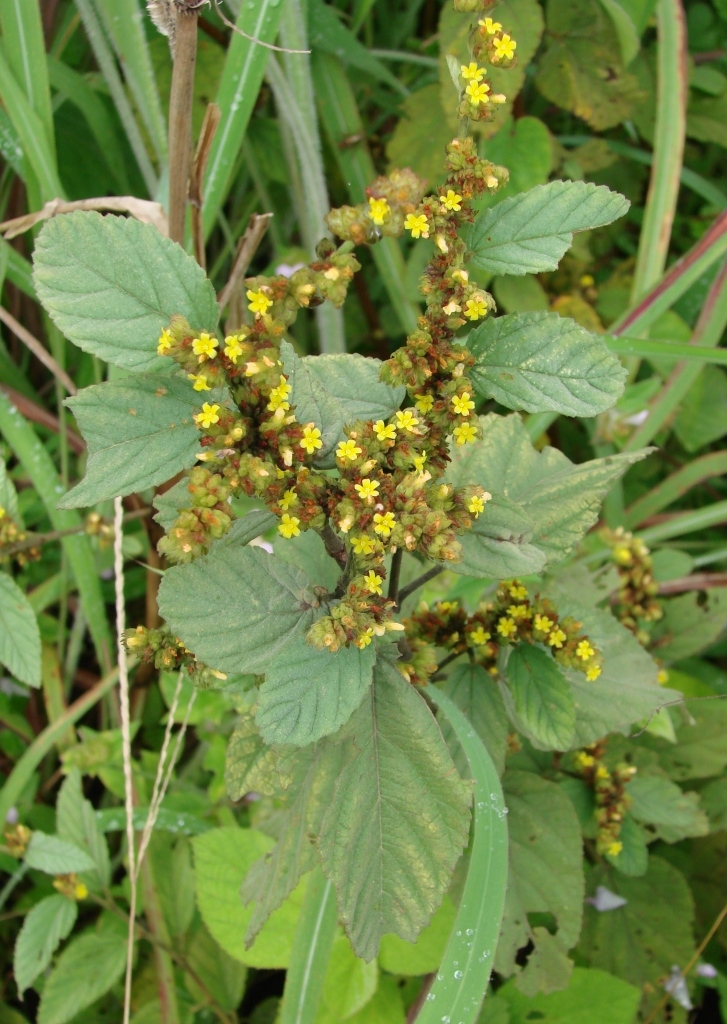
Waltheria americana

== Ecology ==
Larvae have been recorded on Abutilon incanum, Sida cordifolia, Sida fallax, Sida rhombifolia and Waltheria americana. The caterpillars are green loopers.
