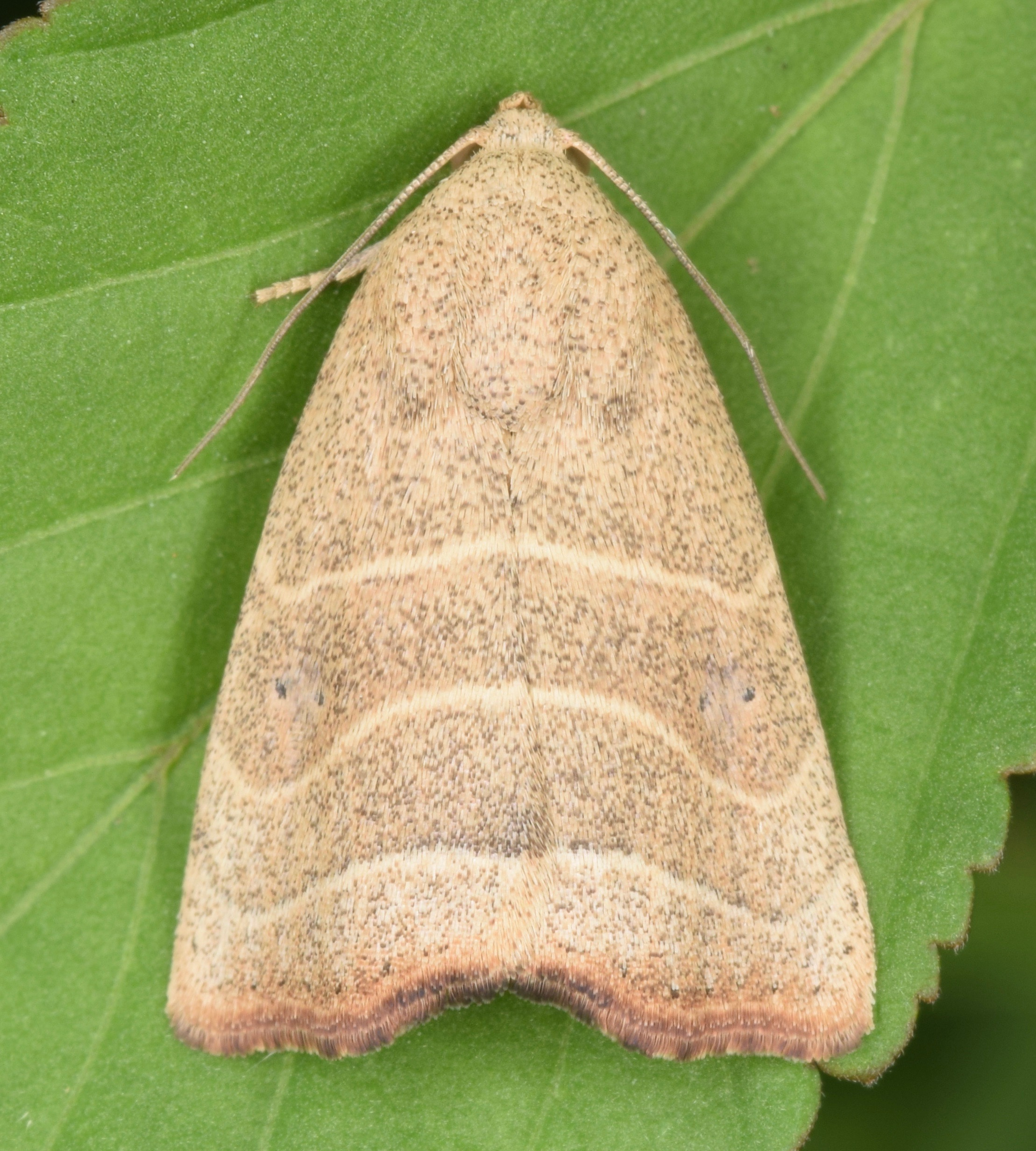

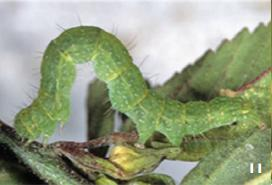
- Adult (top), and larva (lower)

Scientific classification
- Domain: Eukaryota
- Kingdom: Animalia
- Phylum: Arthropoda
- Class: Insecta
- Order: Lepidoptera
- Superfamily: Noctuoidea
- Family: Noctuidae
- Genus: Bagisara
- Species: B. repanda

Binomial name
- Bagisara repanda (Fabricius, 1793)

Synonyms
- Bombyx repanda Fabricius, 1793; Atethmia subusta Hübner, [1821]; Atethmia inusta Guenée, 1852; Anomis dispartita Walker, [1858]; Anthophila erecta Walker, [1858]; Poaphila congesta Walker, [1858]; Bagisara incidens Walker, 1858; Laphygma trilinea Walker, 1865; Acontia venusta Berg, 1882; Acontia unipunctata Möschler, 1890

= Bagisara repanda =

Species of moth

Bagisara repanda, the wavy lined mallow moth, is a moth of the family Noctuidae. The species was first described by Johan Christian Fabricius in 1793. It is found from the southern United States (South Carolina to Florida, west to Texas), south through Guatemala, Panama, the Antilles, Paraguay, Colombia, Venezuela, Guyana and Brazil to Argentina.

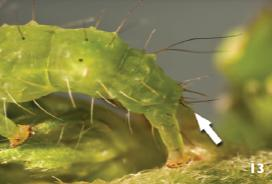
Larva caudal segments

The length of the forewings is 10–12 mm. In Louisiana, most adults are on wing from late August to November. Adults are on wing all year round in the tropics and perhaps in Florida.

The larvae feed on Sida species and possibly other plants in the Malvaceae.
