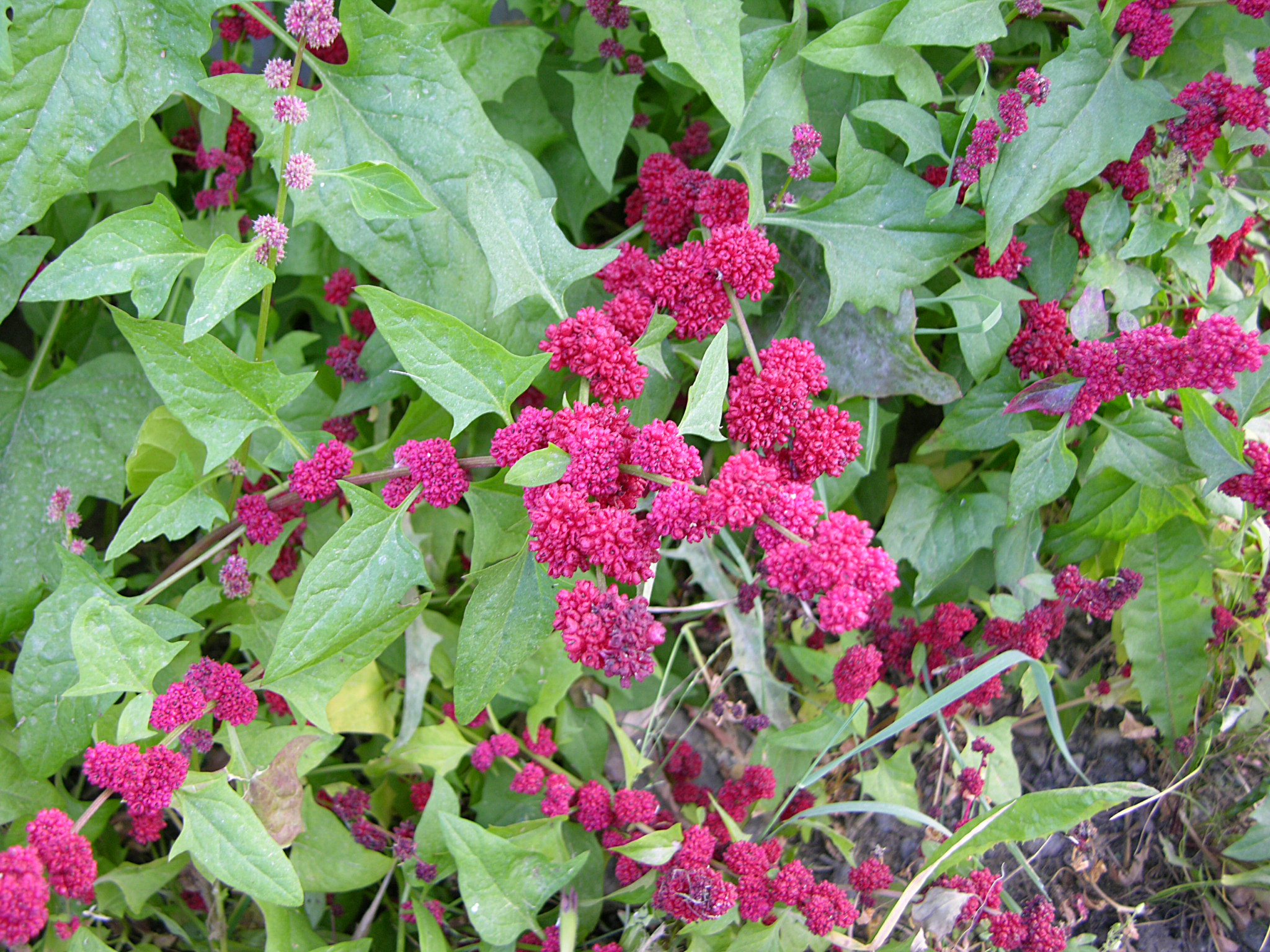

Scientific classification
- Kingdom: Plantae
- Clade: Tracheophytes
- Clade: Angiosperms
- Clade: Eudicots
- Order: Caryophyllales
- Family: Amaranthaceae
- Genus: Blitum
- Species: B. capitatum

Binomial name
- Blitum capitatum L.

= Blitum capitatum =

Strawberry blite

Species of flowering plant

Strawberry blite (Blitum capitatum, syn. Chenopodium capitatum) is an edible annual plant, also known as blite goosefoot, strawberry goosefoot, strawberry spinach, Indian paint, and Indian ink.

It is native to most of North America throughout the United States and Canada, including northern areas. It is considered to be extirpated in Ohio. It is also found in parts of Europe and New Zealand.

Fruit are small, pulpy, bright red and edible, resembling strawberries, though their taste is more bland. The juice from the fruit was also used as a red dye by native North Americans. The fruits contain small, black, lens-shaped seeds that are 0.7–1.2 mm long. The greens contain vitamins A and C; they are edible raw when young or as a potherb. If raw they should be eaten in moderation as they contain oxalates. The seeds may be toxic in large amounts.

Strawberry blite is found in moist mountain valleys.
