= Bagisara laverna =

Scientific classification
- Domain: Eukaryota
- Kingdom: Animalia
- Phylum: Arthropoda
- Class: Insecta
- Order: Lepidoptera
- Superfamily: Noctuoidea
- Family: Noctuidae
- Genus: Bagisara
- Species: B. laverna

Binomial name
- Bagisara laverna (H. Druce, 1889)

Species of moth

Bagisara laverna is a species of moth in the family Noctuidae (the owlet moths).

The MONA or Hodges number for Bagisara laverna is 9175.2.
