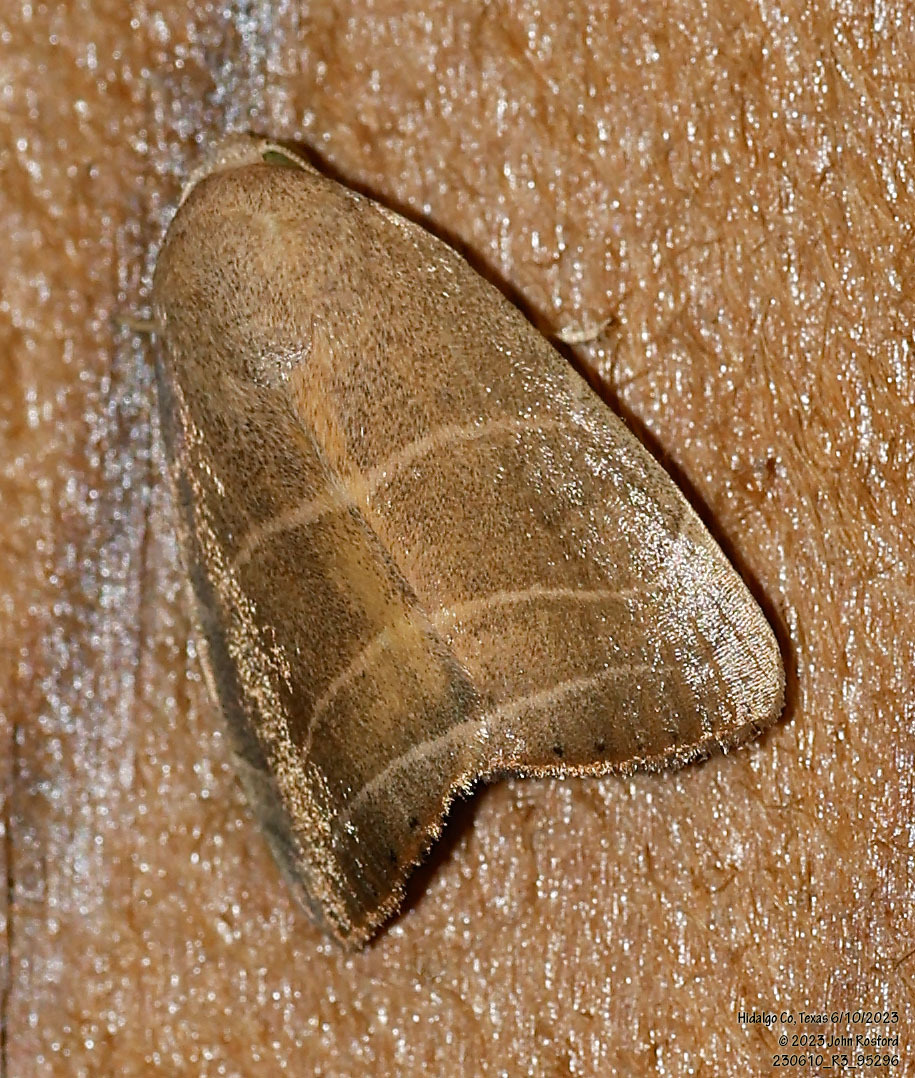

Scientific classification
- Kingdom: Animalia
- Phylum: Arthropoda
- Clade: Pancrustacea
- Class: Insecta
- Order: Lepidoptera
- Superfamily: Noctuoidea
- Family: Noctuidae
- Genus: Bagisara
- Species: B. pacifica

Binomial name
- Bagisara pacifica Schaus, 1911

= Bagisara pacifica =

Species of moth

Bagisara pacifica is a species of moth in the owlet moth family Noctuidae. It was first described by William Schaus in 1911 and is found in North America.
