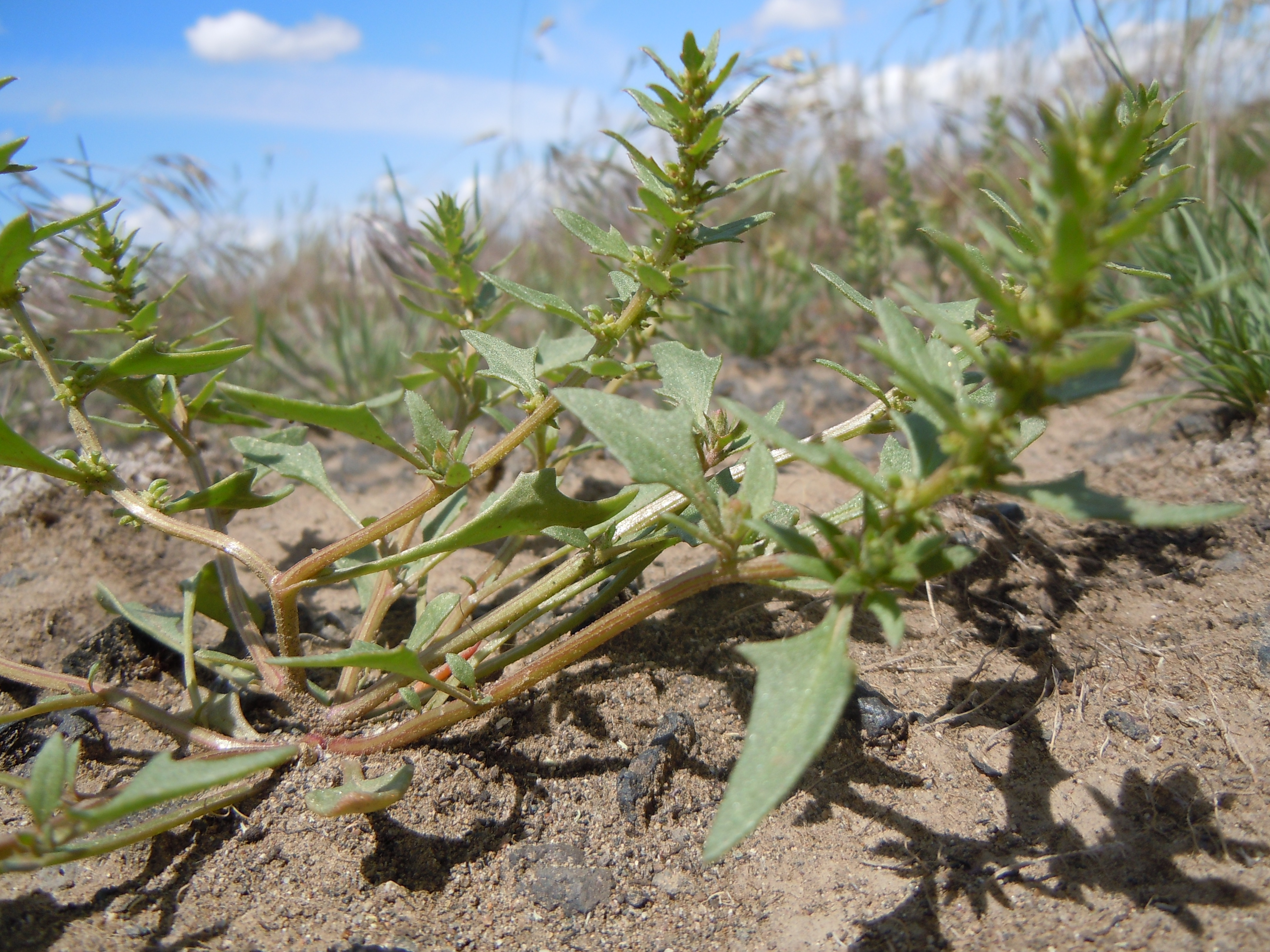

Conservation status
- Secure (NatureServe)

Scientific classification
- Kingdom: Plantae
- Clade: Tracheophytes
- Clade: Angiosperms
- Clade: Eudicots
- Order: Caryophyllales
- Family: Amaranthaceae
- Genus: Blitum
- Species: B. nuttallianum

Binomial name
- Blitum nuttallianum Schult.

Synonyms
- Blitum chenopodioides Nutt; Monolepis chenopodioides Moq; Monolepis nuttalliana (Schult.) Greene; Chenopodium trifidum Trev; Monolepis trifida (Trev.) Schrad

= Blitum nuttallianum =

Species of flowering plant

Blitum nuttallianum, (syn. Monolepis nuttalliana) is a species of flowering plant in the amaranth family known by the common names povertyweed and Nuttall's povertyweed. It is native to North America, where it is widespread and common from Alaska to Mexico to New England. It can be found in many types of habitat, including disturbed areas, often favoring wet places. It is a fleshy annual herb producing two or more erect, reddish, hairless stems up to about 40 centimeters tall. The thick lance-shaped or arrowhead-shaped leaves are up to 4 centimeters in length. Clusters of several rounded flowers each appear in the leaf axils and yield small fruits about 2 millimeters wide.

Many Native American groups used this plant as a medicine and a food. Southwestern tribes ground the seeds, combining them with mesquite beans and corn. The roots are edible, and the young stems are edible when cooked.
