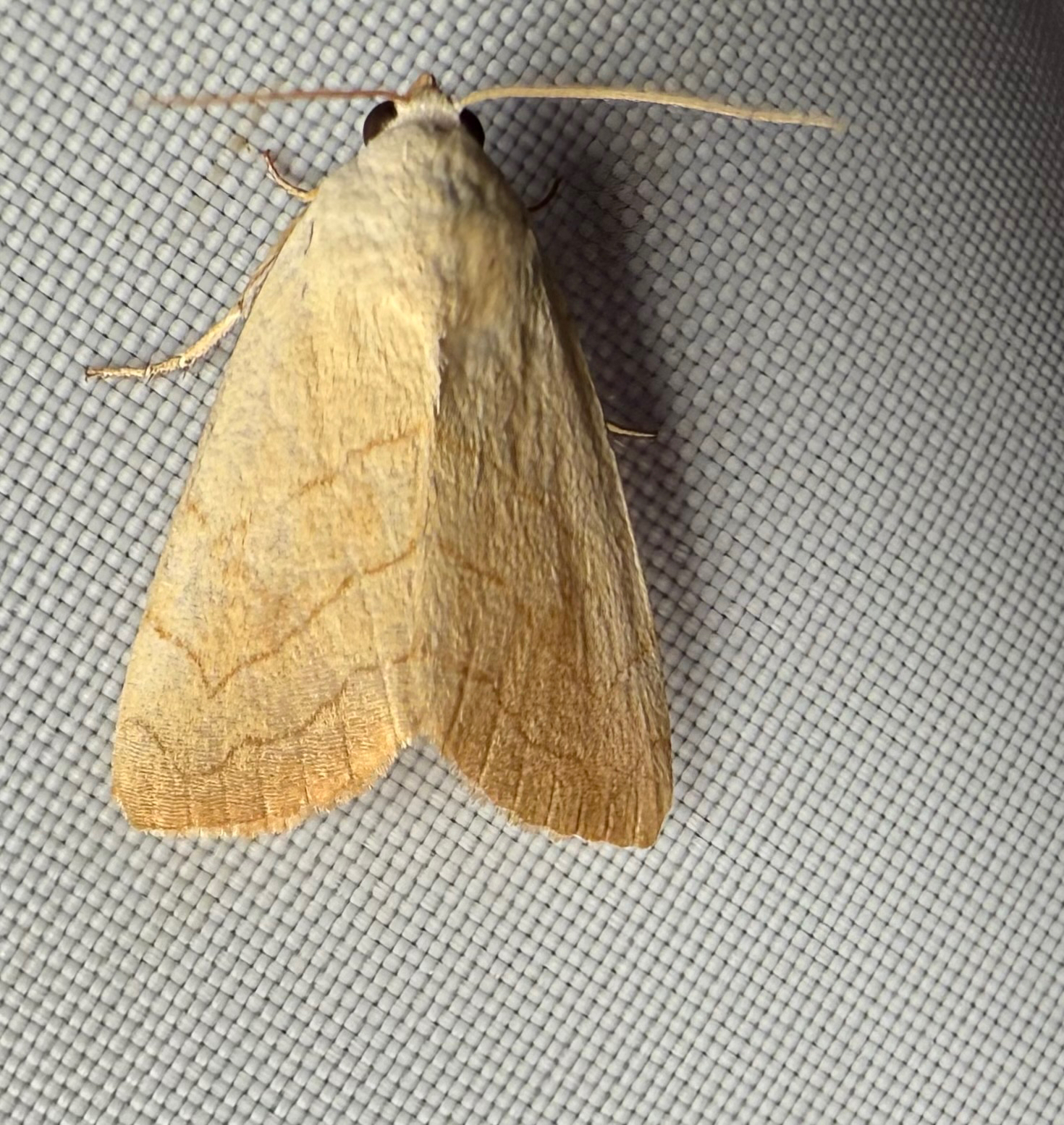
- Bagisara buxea, Texas

Scientific classification
- Kingdom: Animalia
- Phylum: Arthropoda
- Class: Insecta
- Order: Lepidoptera
- Superfamily: Noctuoidea
- Family: Noctuidae
- Genus: Bagisara
- Species: B. buxea

Binomial name
- Bagisara buxea (Grote, 1881)

= Bagisara buxea =

Species of moth

Bagisara buxea is a species of moth in the family Noctuidae (the owlet moths). It is found in North America.

The MONA or Hodges number for Bagisara buxea is 9172.
