= Amyna bullula =

Scientific classification
- Kingdom: Animalia
- Phylum: Arthropoda
- Class: Insecta
- Order: Lepidoptera
- Superfamily: Noctuoidea
- Family: Noctuidae
- Genus: Amyna
- Species: A. bullula

Binomial name
- Amyna bullula (Grote, 1873)

Species of moth

Amyna bullula, the hook-tipped amyna moth, is a species of moth in the family Noctuidae (the owlet moths). It is found in North America.

The MONA or Hodges number for Amyna bullula is 9069.

== Subspecies ==
These two subspecies belong to the species Amyna bullula:

- Amyna bullula bullula
- Amyna bullula concolorata Barnes & Benjamin, 1924
