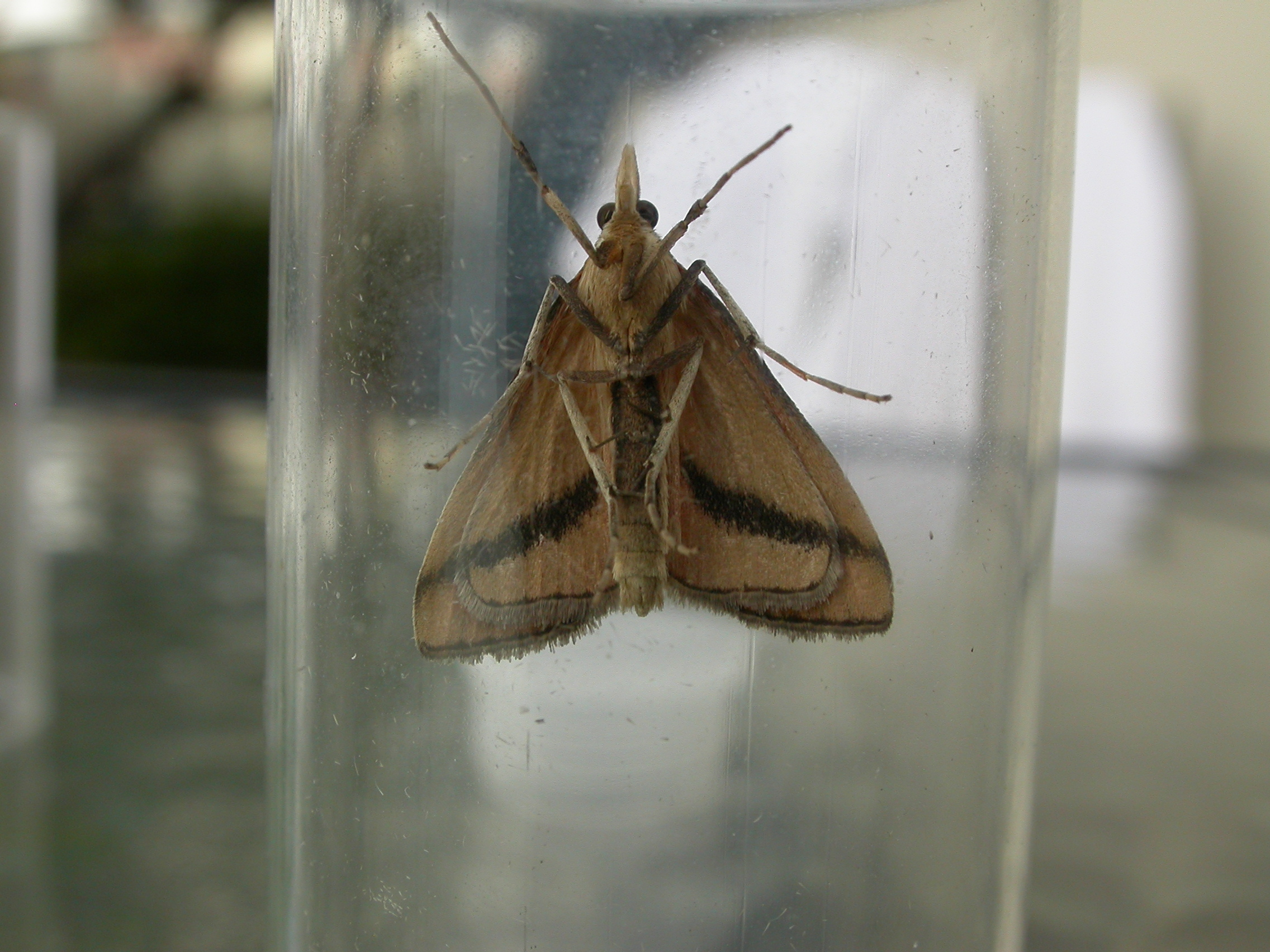

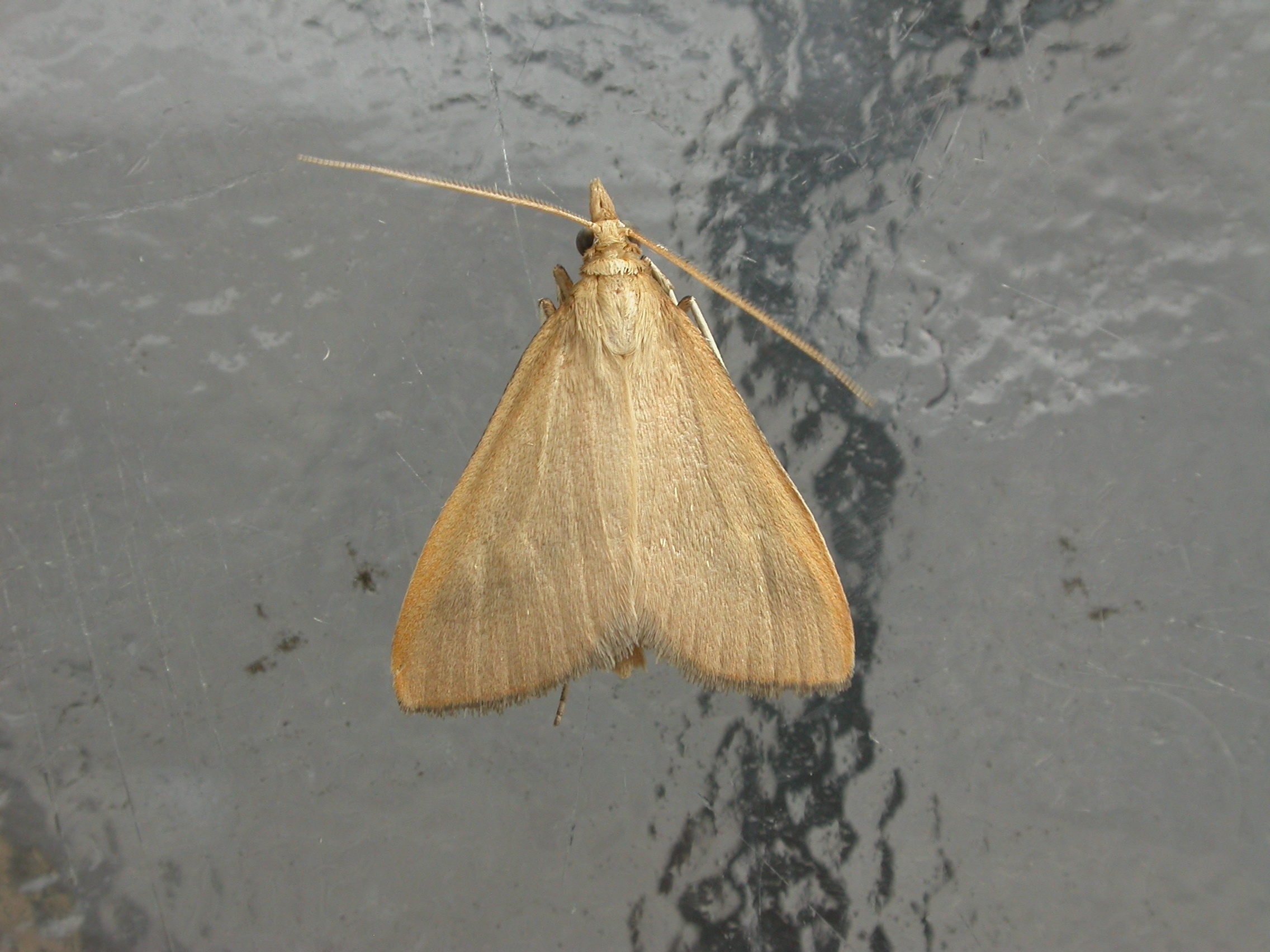

Scientific classification
- Domain: Eukaryota
- Kingdom: Animalia
- Phylum: Arthropoda
- Class: Insecta
- Order: Lepidoptera
- Family: Crambidae
- Subfamily: Spilomelinae
- Genus: Osiriaca; Walker, 1866
- Species: O. ptousalis

Binomial name
- Osiriaca ptousalis (Walker, 1859)

Synonyms
- Generic; Myriotis Meyrick, 1885; Specific; Botys ptousalis Walker, 1859; Osiriaca inturbidalis Walker, 1866; Botys ptoalis Meyrick, 1885; Amyna aurea T.P. Lucas, 1898

= Osiriaca =

Genus of moths

Osiriaca is a monotypic moth genus of the family Crambidae described by Francis Walker in 1866. Its only species, Osiriaca ptousalis, described by the same author in 1859, is known from Australia.

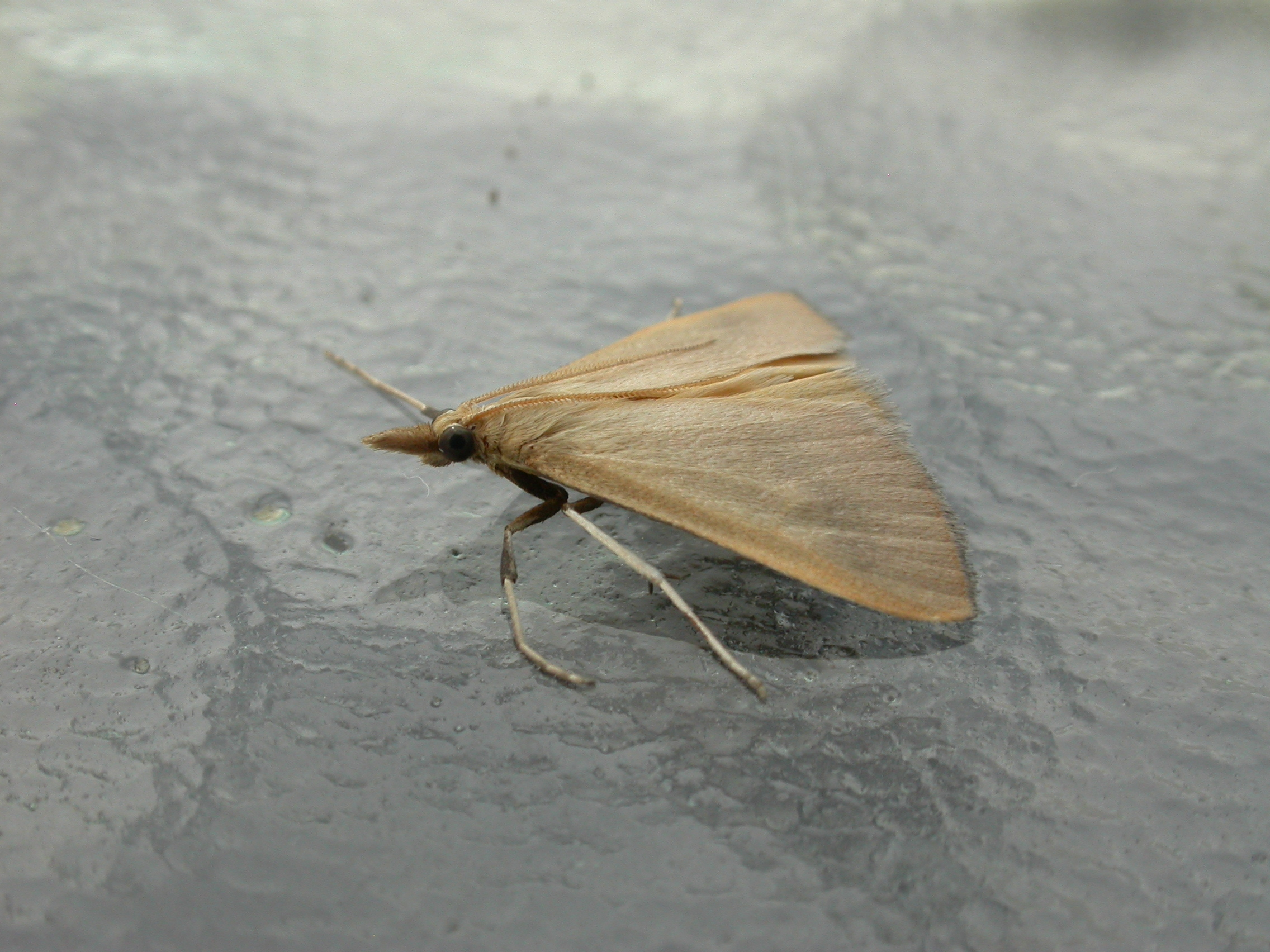
