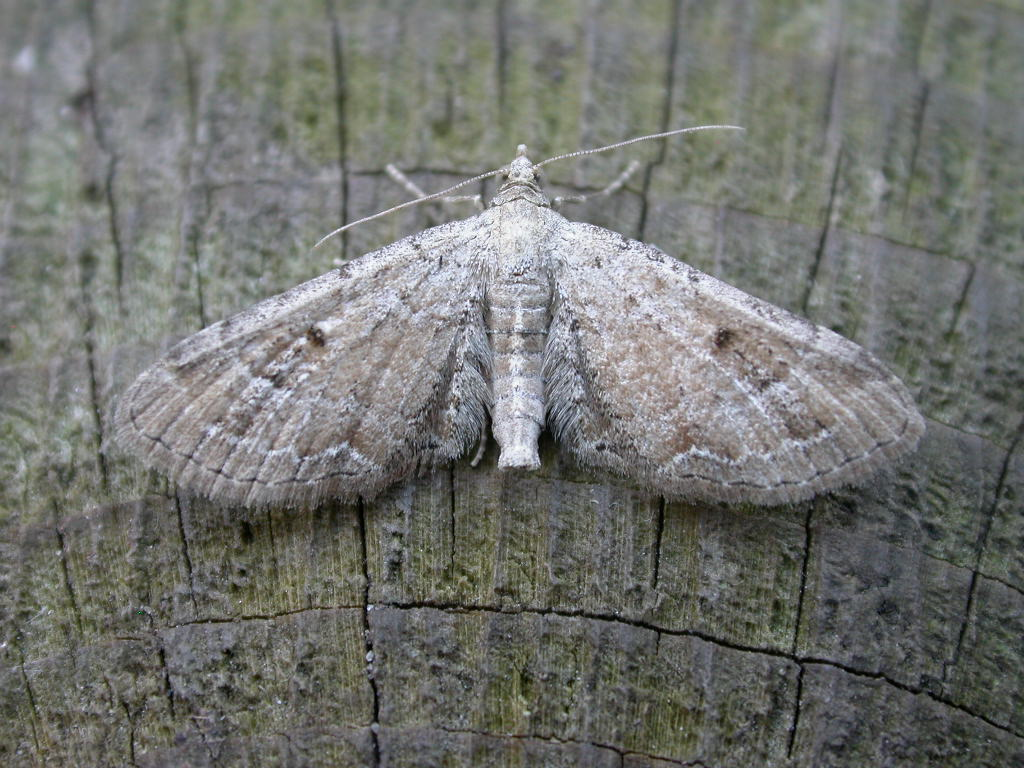

Scientific classification
- Kingdom: Animalia
- Phylum: Arthropoda
- Clade: Pancrustacea
- Class: Insecta
- Order: Lepidoptera
- Family: Geometridae
- Genus: Eupithecia
- Species: E. simpliciata

Binomial name
- Eupithecia simpliciata (Haworth, 1809)

Synonyms
- Phalaena simpliciata Haworth, 1809; Geometra subnotata Hübner, 1813; Eupithecia subnotata; Eupithecia subnotata f. collustrata Dietze, 1911

= Eupithecia simpliciata =

Species of moth

Eupithecia simpliciata, the plain pug, is a moth of the family Geometridae. It is found in the Palearctic realm, from western Europe to north-western China (Xinjiang).

== Description ==
The wingspan is 21–23 mm. Eupithecia simpliciata has a relatively broad rounded forewing. The forewing ground colour is pale ochre. The forewing has indistinct, curved fuscous striae. The postmedian fascia has curved pale edges, the outer one zig-zagged towards the tornus. The forewing fringes are chequered. The hindwings are whitish-grey, darkened in the postmedian field. The discal spot is small. The moths vary significantly in colour and pattern. See also Prout

== Distribution and habitat ==
The species primarily colonizes wastelands, rubble and abandoned vineyards, and in Asia also salt steppes. In the Alps, the range of altitude extends up to 1,200 m (3,900 ft).

== Biology ==
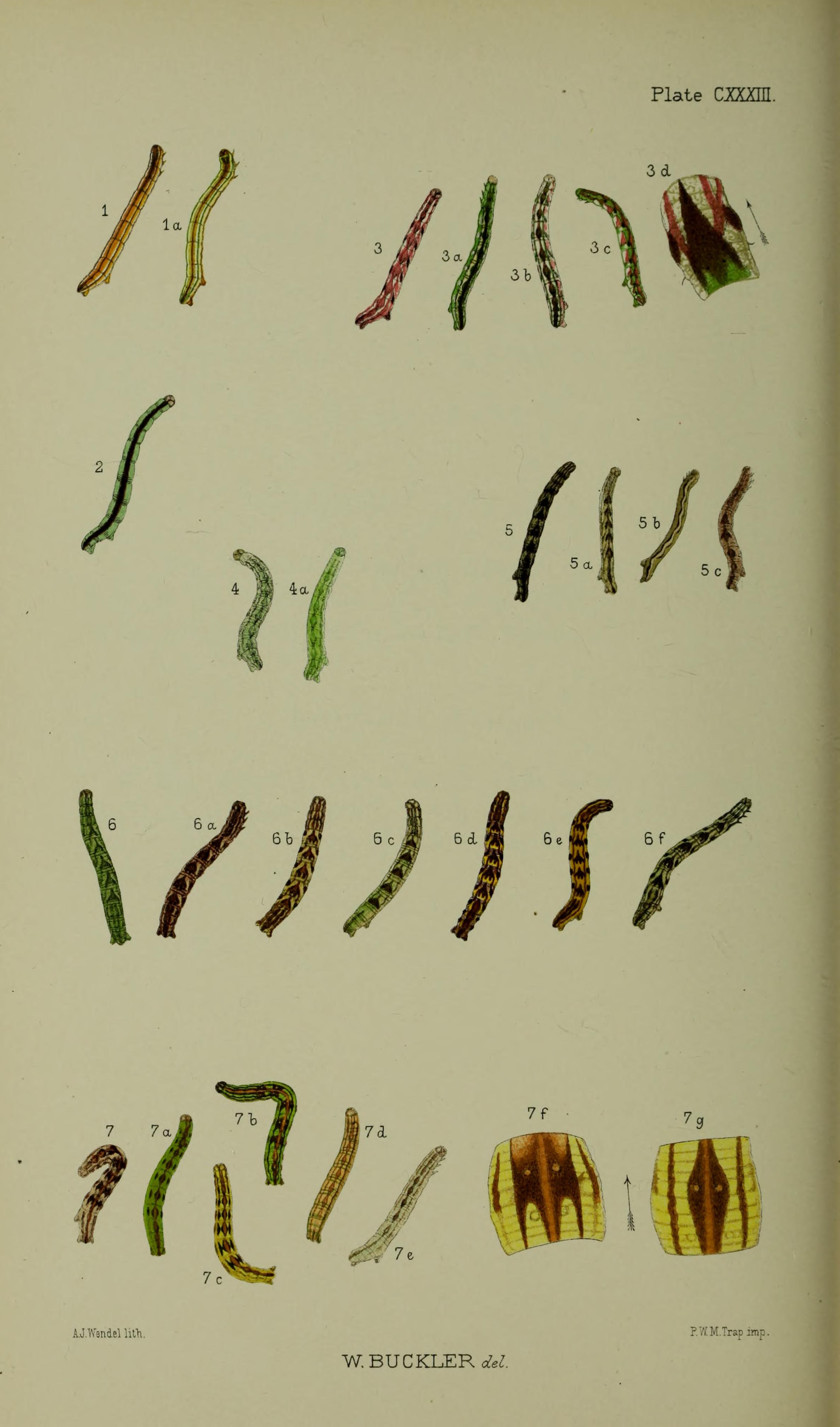
Figs 4,4a larvae after final moult

The caterpillars are greenish or brownish coloured and usually show indistinct dark angular or diamond markings on the back. The pupa is brownish, the wing sheaths shimmer greenish. The cone-shaped cremaster is equipped with two curved thorns as well as some short hook bristles.

The moth flies from May to September, depending on the location.

The larvae feed on Atriplex, Chenopodium, Artemisia maritima and Artemisia vulgaris.
