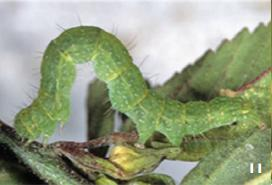

Scientific classification
- Domain: Eukaryota
- Kingdom: Animalia
- Phylum: Arthropoda
- Class: Insecta
- Order: Lepidoptera
- Superfamily: Noctuoidea
- Family: Noctuidae
- Subfamily: Bagisarinae
- Genus: Bagisara; Crumb, 1956

Synonyms
- Caroia Walker, 1858

= Bagisara =

Genus of moths

Bagisara is a genus of moths of the monotypic subfamily Bagisarinae of the family Noctuidae. It is found mainly in North America and the Amazon rainforest.

== Species ==
- Bagisara albicosta Schaus, 1911
- Bagisara avangareza Schaus, 1911
- Bagisara brouana Ferguson, 1997
- Bagisara buxea Grote, 1881
- Bagisara demura Dyar, 1913
- Bagisara graphicomas Dyar, 1922
- Bagisara gulnare Strecker, 1878
- Bagisara laverna Druce, 1889
- Bagisara lulua Schaus, 1921
- Bagisara malacha Druce, 1889
- Bagisara obscura Hampson, 1910
- Bagisara oula Dyar, 1913
- Bagisara pacifica Schaus, 1911
- Bagisara patula Druce, 1898
- Bagisara paulensis Schaus, 1898
- Bagisara praecelsa Ferguson, 1997
- Bagisara rectifascia Grote, 1874
- Bagisara repanda (Fabricius, 1793)
- Bagisara tristicta Hampson, 1898
- Bagisara xan Dyar, 1913
