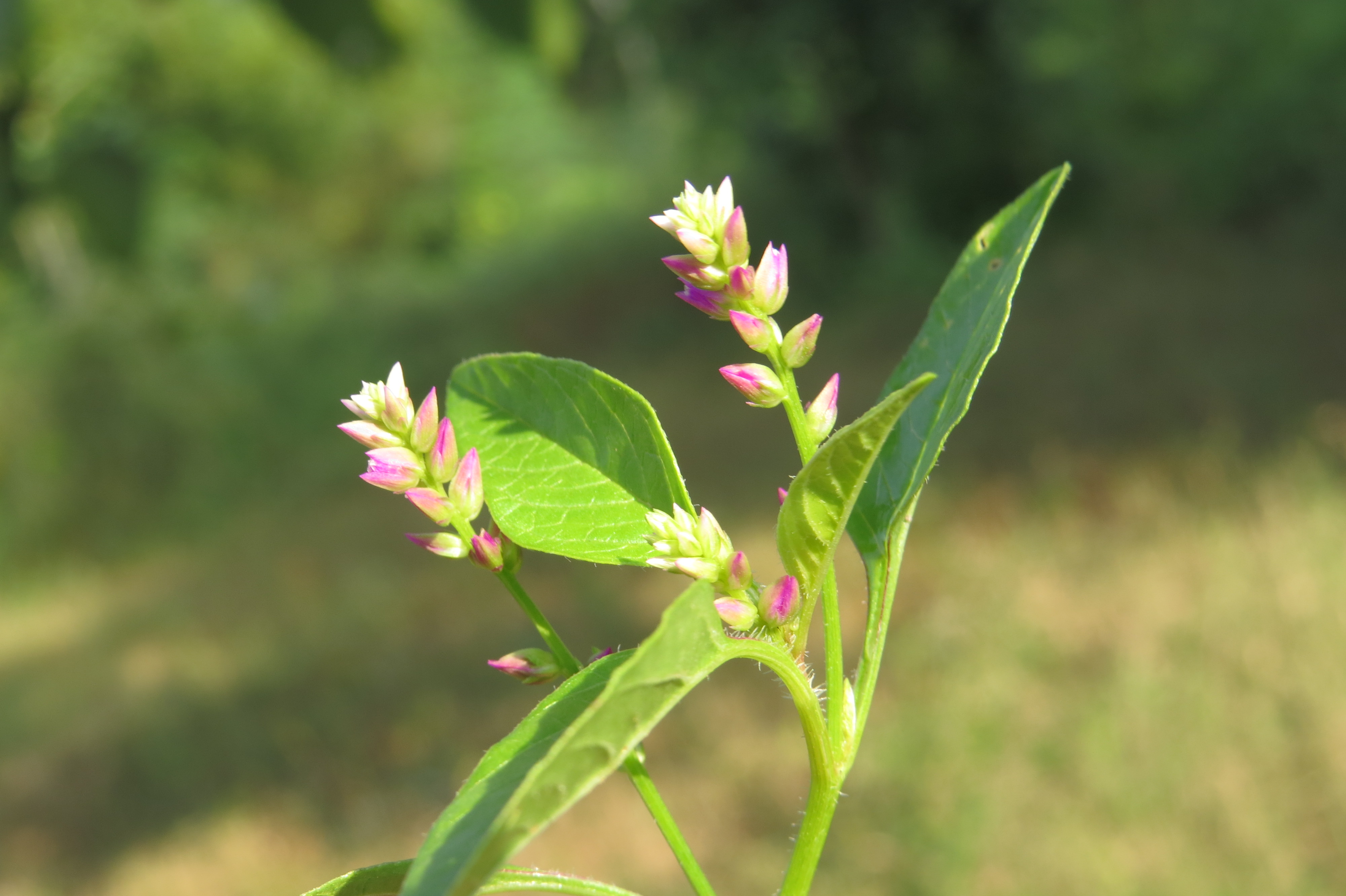
- Digera muricata in Tamil Nadu, India

Scientific classification
- Kingdom: Plantae
- Clade: Embryophytes
- Clade: Tracheophytes
- Clade: Angiosperms
- Clade: Eudicots
- Order: Caryophyllales
- Family: Amaranthaceae
- Genus: Digera; Forssk. (1775)
- Species: D. muricata

Binomial name
- Digera muricata (L.) Mart. (1926)

Subspecies and varieties
- Digera muricata var. macroptera C.C.Towns.; Digera muricata subsp. muricata; Digera muricata var. patentipilosa C.C.Towns.; Digera muricata subsp. trinervis C.C.Towns.

Synonyms
- Eclotoripa Raf. (1837); Pseudodigera Chiov. (1936); Achyranthes muricata L. (1762); Amaranthus frutescens Dum.Cours. (1802), nom. illeg.; Chamissoa muricata (L.) Spreng. (1824); Cladostachys muricata (L.) Moq. (1849); Desmochaeta muricata (L.) DC. (1813)

= Digera =

Genus of plants

Digera muricata is a species of flowering plant belonging to the family Amaranthaceae. It is the sole species in the genus Digera. It is an annual native to parts of Africa and Asia, ranging from Egypt to Tanzania in eastern Africa, and to Madagascar, the Arabian Peninsula, Afghanistan, the Indian Subcontinent, Myanmar, southeastern China, Sumatra, Java, Sulawesi, and the Maluku Islands.

== Subdivisions ==
Four subdivisions are recognized:

- Digera muricata var. macroptera C.C.Towns. – eastern Africa, from Ethiopia and Somalia to Tanzania
- Digera muricata subsp. muricata – Egypt, Eritrea, Djibouti, Somalia, Kenya, Rwanda, Madagascar, the Arabian Peninsula, Afghanistan, the Indian subcontinent, Myanmar, southeastern China, Sumatra, Java, Sulawesi, and Maluku
- Digera muricata var. patentipilosa C.C.Towns. – southern Somalia, eastern Kenya, and Socotra
- Digera muricata subsp. trinervis C.C.Towns. – northeastern and eastern tropical Africa from Sudan to Tanzania
