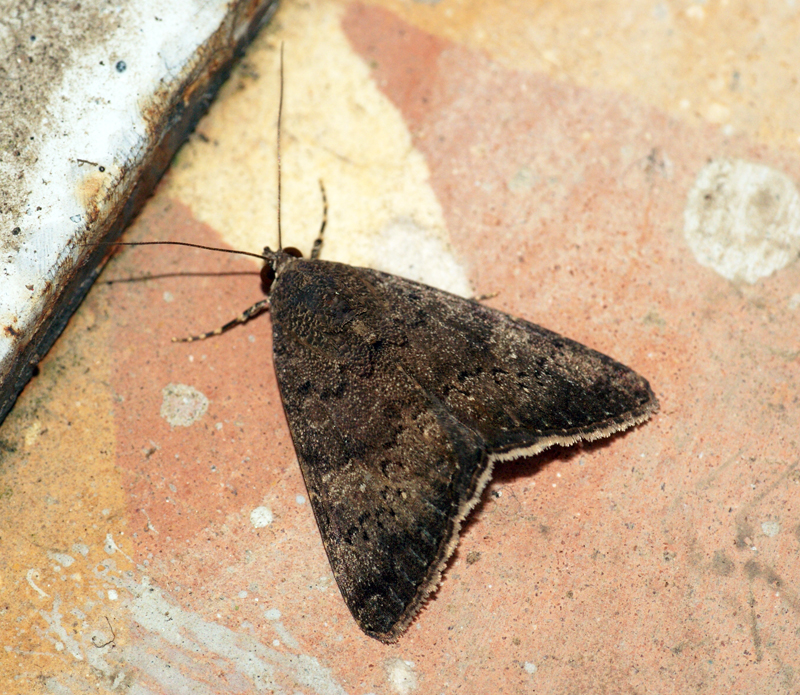

Scientific classification
- Kingdom: Animalia
- Phylum: Arthropoda
- Clade: Pancrustacea
- Class: Insecta
- Order: Lepidoptera
- Superfamily: Noctuoidea
- Family: Noctuidae
- Genus: Amyna
- Species: A. punctum

Binomial name
- Amyna punctum (Fabricius, 1794)

Synonyms
- Noctua punctum Fabricius, 1794; Noctua annulata Fabricius, 1794; Amyna selenampha Guenée, 1852; Alamis spoliata Walker, 1858; Hama latipennis Wallengren, 1860; Amyna subtracta Walker, 1862; Perigea trivenefica Wallengren, 1863; Perigea urba Wallengren, 1863; Hadena latipennis Walker, 1865; Perigea natalensis Wallengren, 1865; Hesperimorpha paradoxa Saalmüller, 1880

= Amyna punctum =

Species of moth

Amyna punctum is a moth of the family Noctuidae first described by Johan Christian Fabricius in 1794. This moth can be found throughout subtropical African countries such as South Africa, Madagascar and Australasian countries like India, Sri Lanka, the Philippines, Borneo and the Andaman Islands.

== Description ==
Its wingspan is about 30–36 mm. Forewings of the male with no vesicle in cell. Fuscous brown with an olive tinge in body. Legs ringed with ochreous. Forewings with irregularly waved black line on sub-basal, antemedial, postmedial and sub-marginal areas. Submarginal line indistinct. There is a marginal specks series can be seen. Orbicular and reniform very indistinct, where reniform with its lower part obscured by a prominent ochreous spot in the typical form. Hindwings with traces of a postmedial waved line. Ventral side suffused with white. There is a crenulate sub-marginal line of hindwings can be seen.

== Ecology ==
The larvae feed on Croton (Euphorbiaceae), Triticum vulgare, Gossypium species, and Tricitum aestivum.
