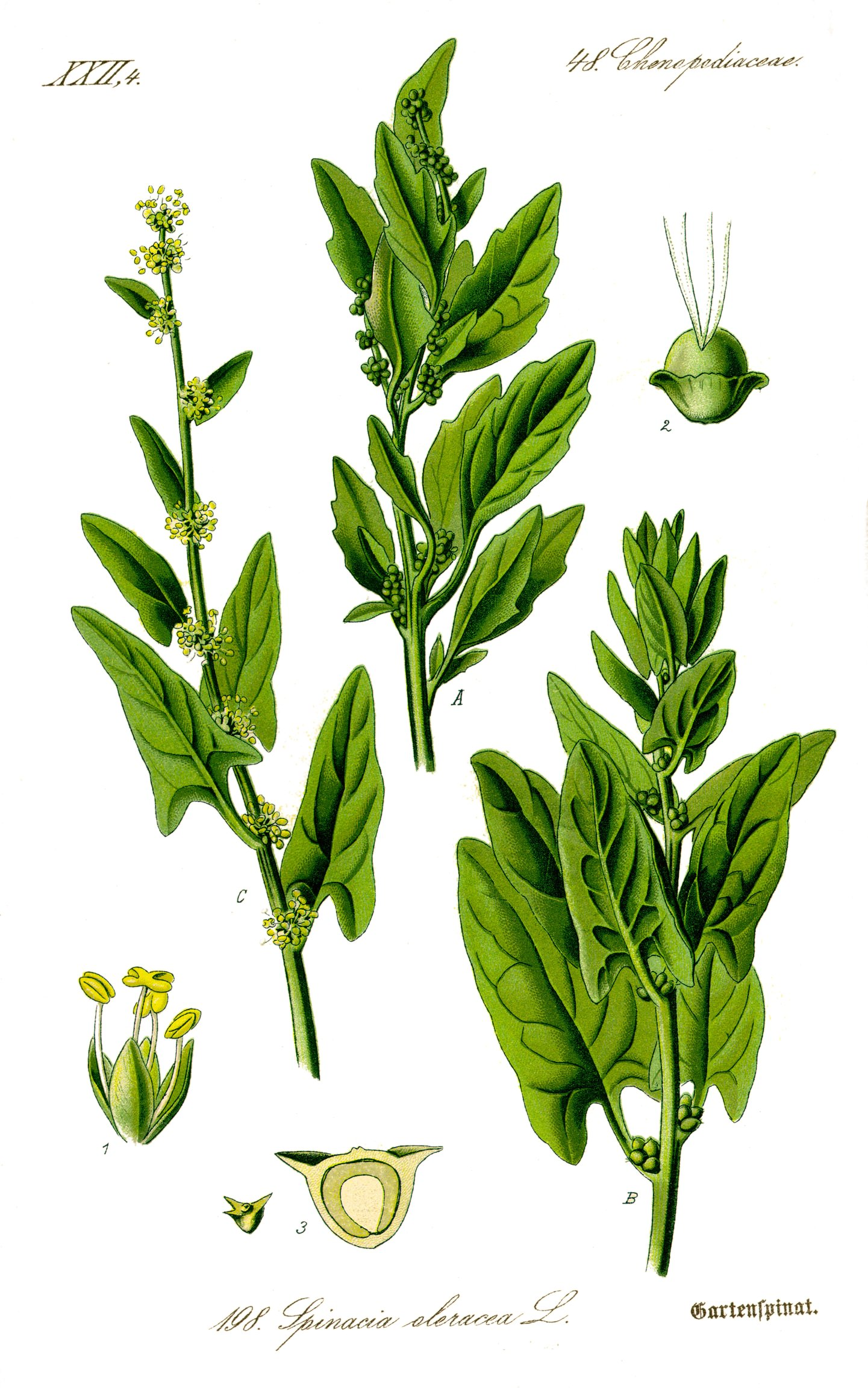
- Spinacia oleracea from Otto Wilhelm Thomé's 1885 Flora von Deutschland, Österreich und der Schweiz

Scientific classification
- Kingdom: Plantae
- Clade: Embryophytes
- Clade: Tracheophytes
- Clade: Angiosperms
- Clade: Eudicots
- Order: Caryophyllales
- Family: Amaranthaceae
- Subfamily: Chenopodioideae
- Tribe: Anserineae
- Genus: Spinacia; L.

Species
- Spinacia oleracea; Spinacia tetrandra; Spinacia turkestanica

= Spinacia =

Genus of flowering plants in the amaranth family

Spinacia is a flowering plant genus in the subfamily Chenopodioideae of the family Amaranthaceae. The most common member is spinach.

== Description ==
The species in genus Spinacia are annual or biennial herbs. Plants are always glabrous. Their stems grow erect and are unbranched or sparsely branched. The alternate leaves consist of a petiole and a simple blade. The basal leaves are often forming a rosette. The leaf blade is triangular-hastate to ovate, sometimes with elongated lobes, with entire or dentate margins and an acute apex.

The plants are usually dioecious, (rarely monoecious). The male flowers are in glomerules forming interrupted terminal spike-like panicles. They consist of 4–5 oblong perianth segments and 4–5 stamens. Female flowers are in glomerules sitting in the leaf axils. Enclosed by 2 accrescent or united bracteoles, without perianth, they consist of an ovary with 4–5 filiform stigmas.

In fruit, bracteoles become enlarged and hardened, sometimes with dentate margins, sometimes several flowers becoming connate. The membranous pericarp adheres to the vertically orientated seed. The dark seed coat is spiny or smooth. The embryo is annular, surrounding the copious, farinaceous perisperm.

The chromosome base number is x = 6, which is unusual for Chenopodioideae.

== Distribution ==
The genus Spinacia was originally distributed in temperate Asia, and has been introduced to the mediterranean area early. Spinacia oleracea grows cultivated or naturalized in all temperate and subtropical regions of Europe, Asia, and North America.

== Systematics ==
The genus Spinacia was first described in 1753 by Carl Linnaeus in Species Plantarum, 2, p. 1027. Type species is Spinacia oleracea. The genus name may derive from the Latin spina or from Persian ispanakh (=spine), referring to the spiny fruit. Spinacia is closely related to genus Blitum, both grouping in Tribus Anserineae (Syn. Spinacieae).

The genus Spinacia comprises 3 species:

- Spinacia oleracea L., spinach: only cultivated, probably originating from Southwest Asia.
- Spinacia tetrandra Steven ex M. Bieb.: in Caucasus region (Armenia, Azerbaijan) and Western Asia (Iran, Iraq, Jordan, Syria, eventually Turkey).
- Spinacia turkestanica Iljin: in Western Asia (Iran) and Middle Asia (Afghanistan, Kazakhstan, Turkmenistan, southern Russia, Pakistan, India, Tibet).
