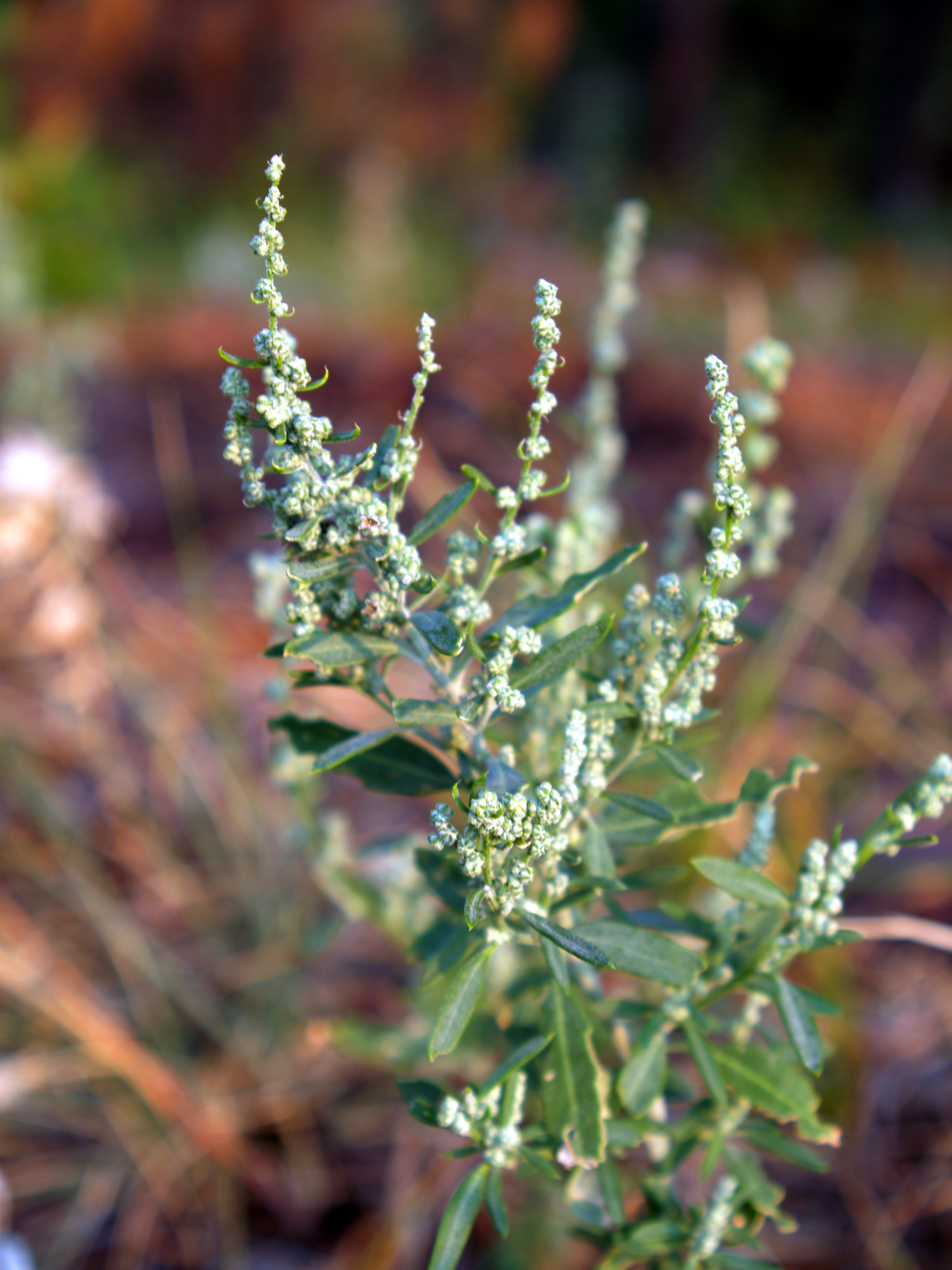
- Chenopodium berlandieri

Scientific classification
- Kingdom: Plantae
- Clade: Tracheophytes
- Clade: Angiosperms
- Clade: Eudicots
- Order: Caryophyllales
- Family: Amaranthaceae
- Subfamily: Chenopodioideae; Burnett

Genera
- About 26 genera, see text

= Chenopodioideae =

Subfamily of flowering plants

The Chenopodioideae are a subfamily of the flowering plant family Amaranthaceae in the APG III system, which is largely based on molecular phylogeny, but were included – together with other subfamilies – in the family Chenopodiaceae, or goosefoot family, in the Cronquist system.

Food species comprise spinach (Spinacia oleracea), Good King Henry (Blitum bonus-henricus), several Chenopodium species (quinoa, kañiwa, fat hen), orache (Atriplex spp.), and epazote (Dysphania ambrosioides). The name is Greek for goosefoot, the common name of a genus of plants having small greenish flowers.

== Description ==
The Chenopodioideae are annual or perennial herbs, subshrubs, shrub or small trees. The leaves are usually alternate and flat.

The flowers are often unisexual. Many species are monoecious or have mixed inflorescences of bisexual and unisexual flowers. Some species are dioecious, like Spinacia, Grayia, Exomis microphylla, and Atriplex. In several species of tribe Atripliceae, the female flowers are without perianth, but enclosed by two bracts. The species with a perianth have up to five tepals. The seed is horizontal or vertical, with annular or horseshoe-shaped embryo.

== Distribution ==
The subfamily Chenopodioideae is distributed worldwide, but originates from Eurasia.

== Systematics ==
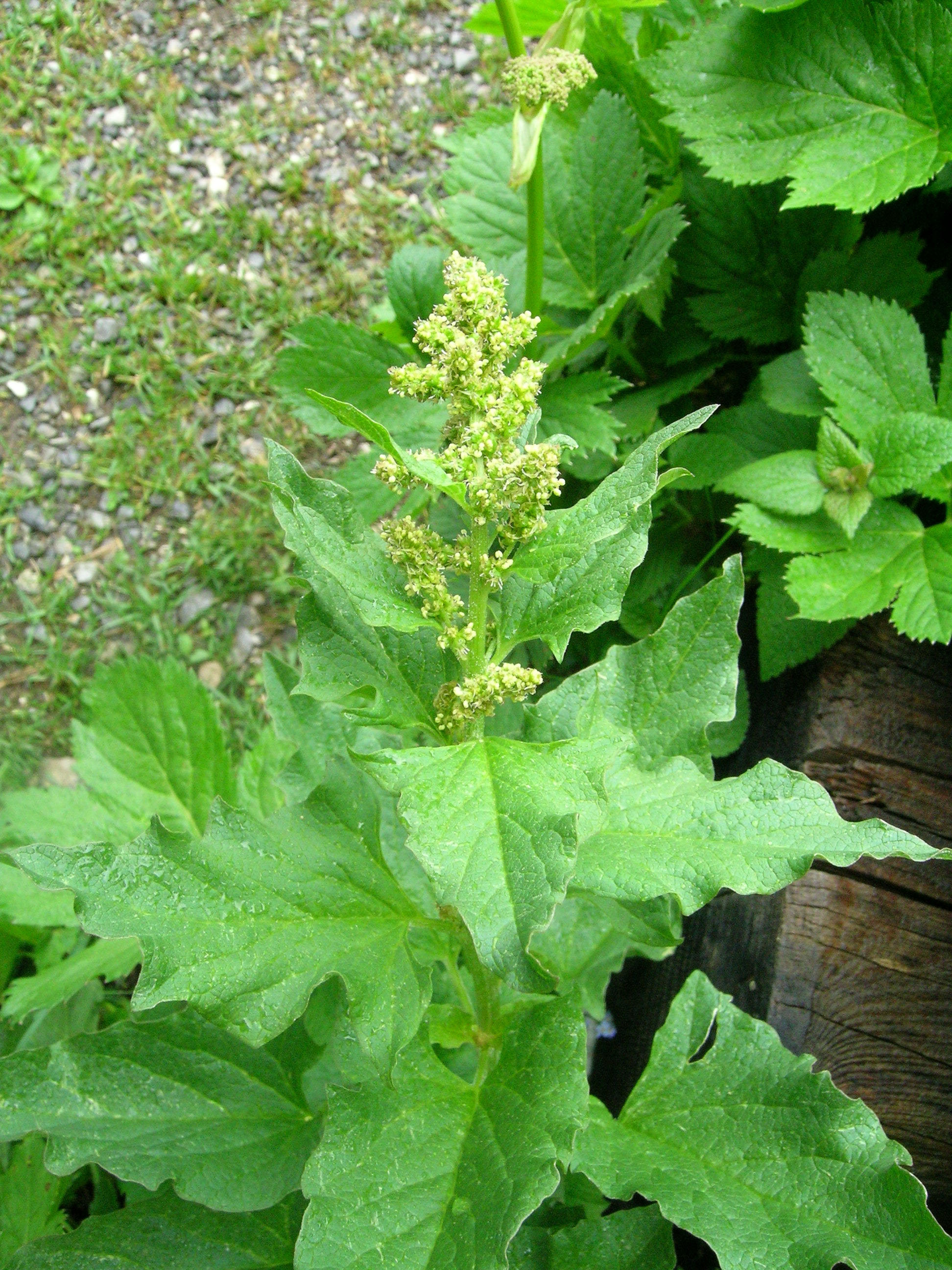
Good King Henry (Blitum bonus-henricus), tribe Anserineae

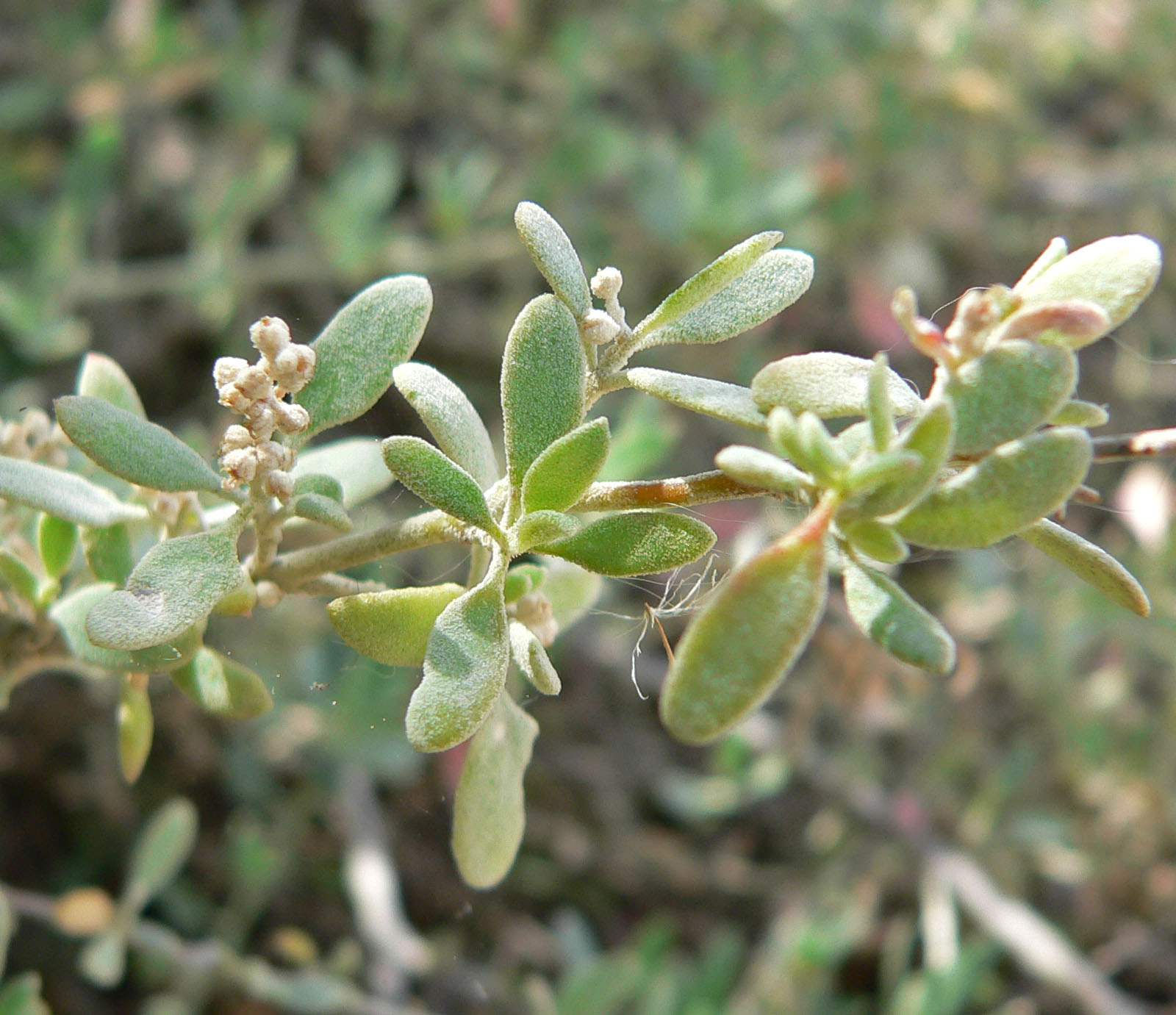
Chenopodium spinescens, tribe Atripliceae

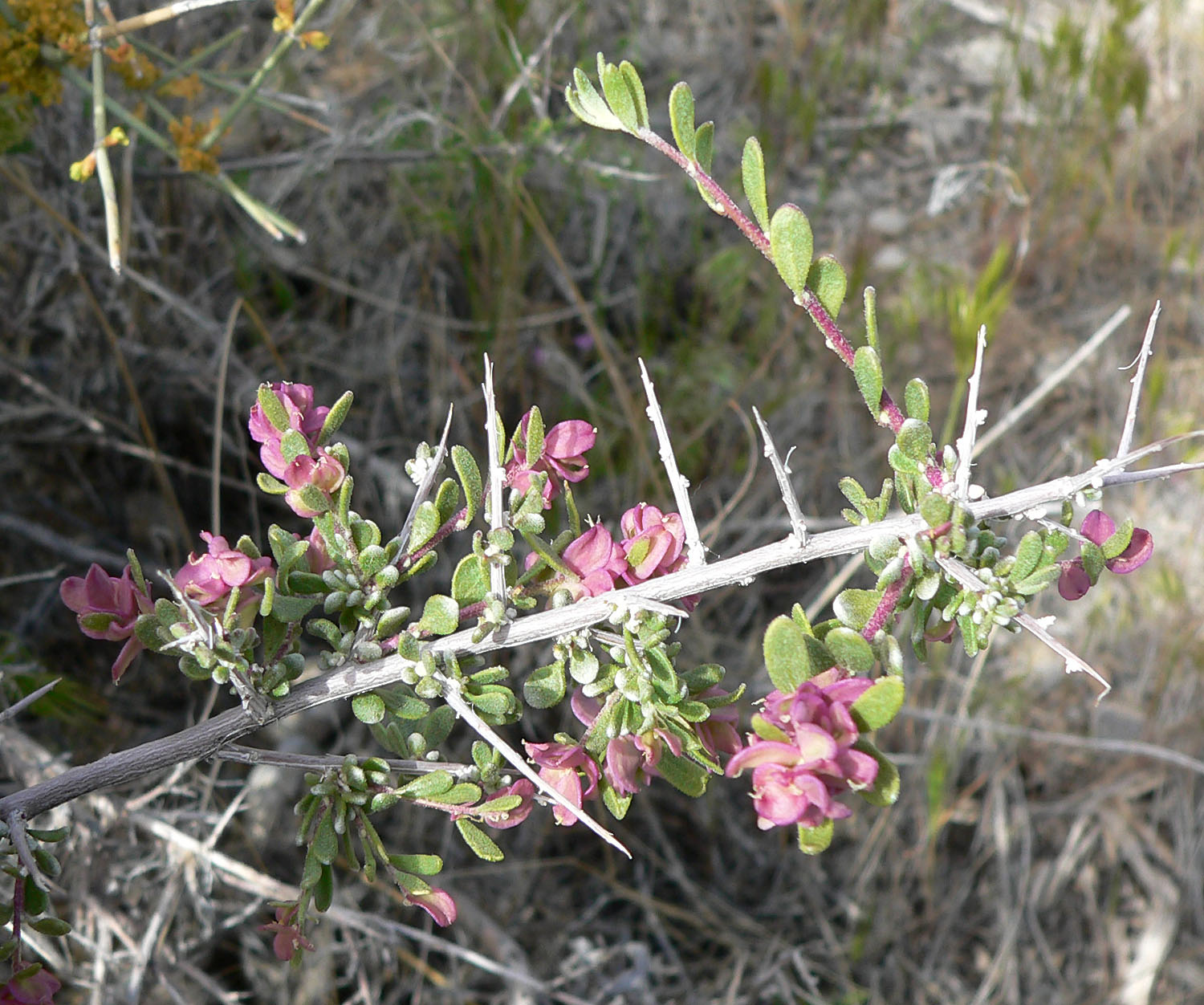
Grayia spinosa, tribe Atripliceae

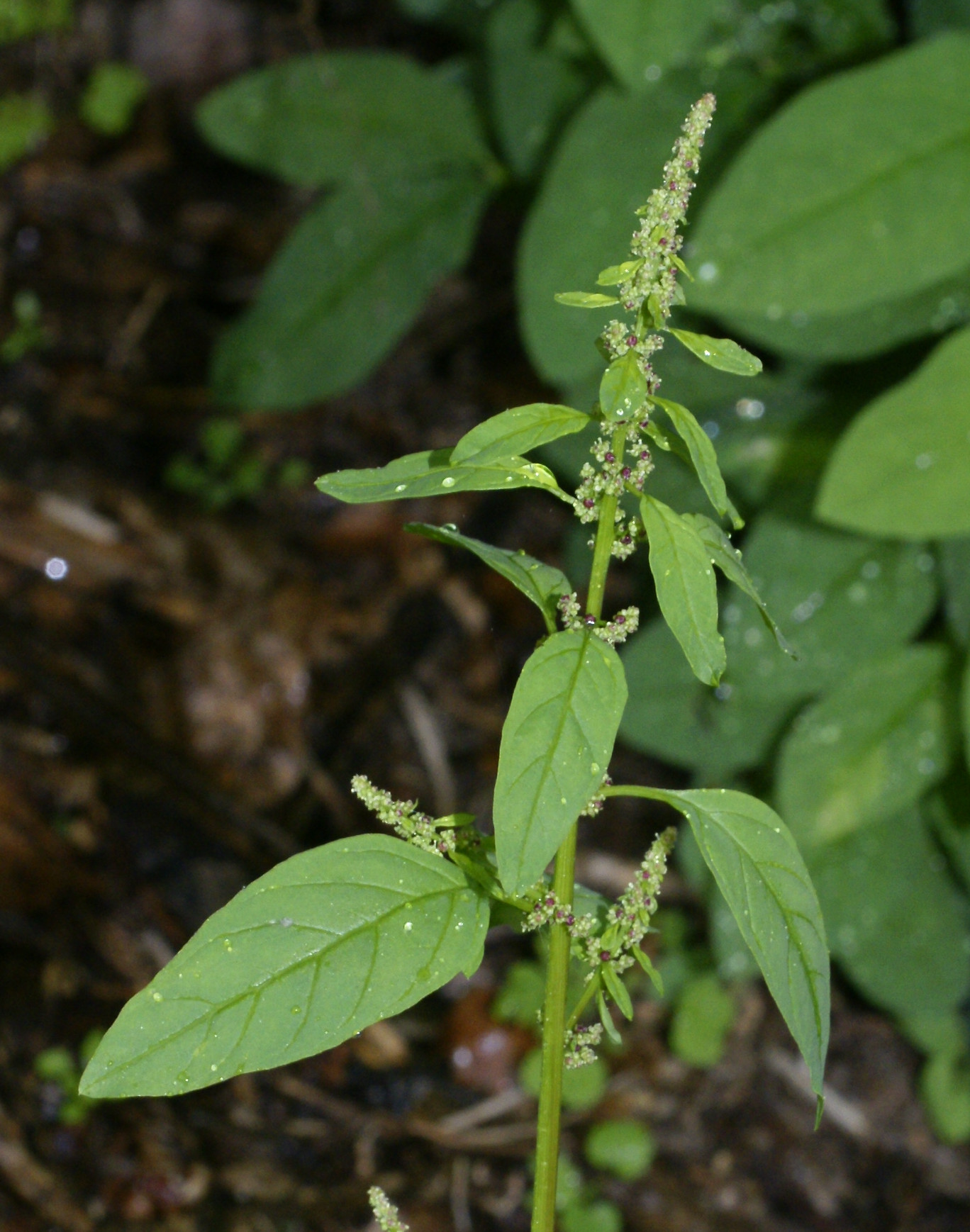
Lipandra polysperma, tribe Atripliceae

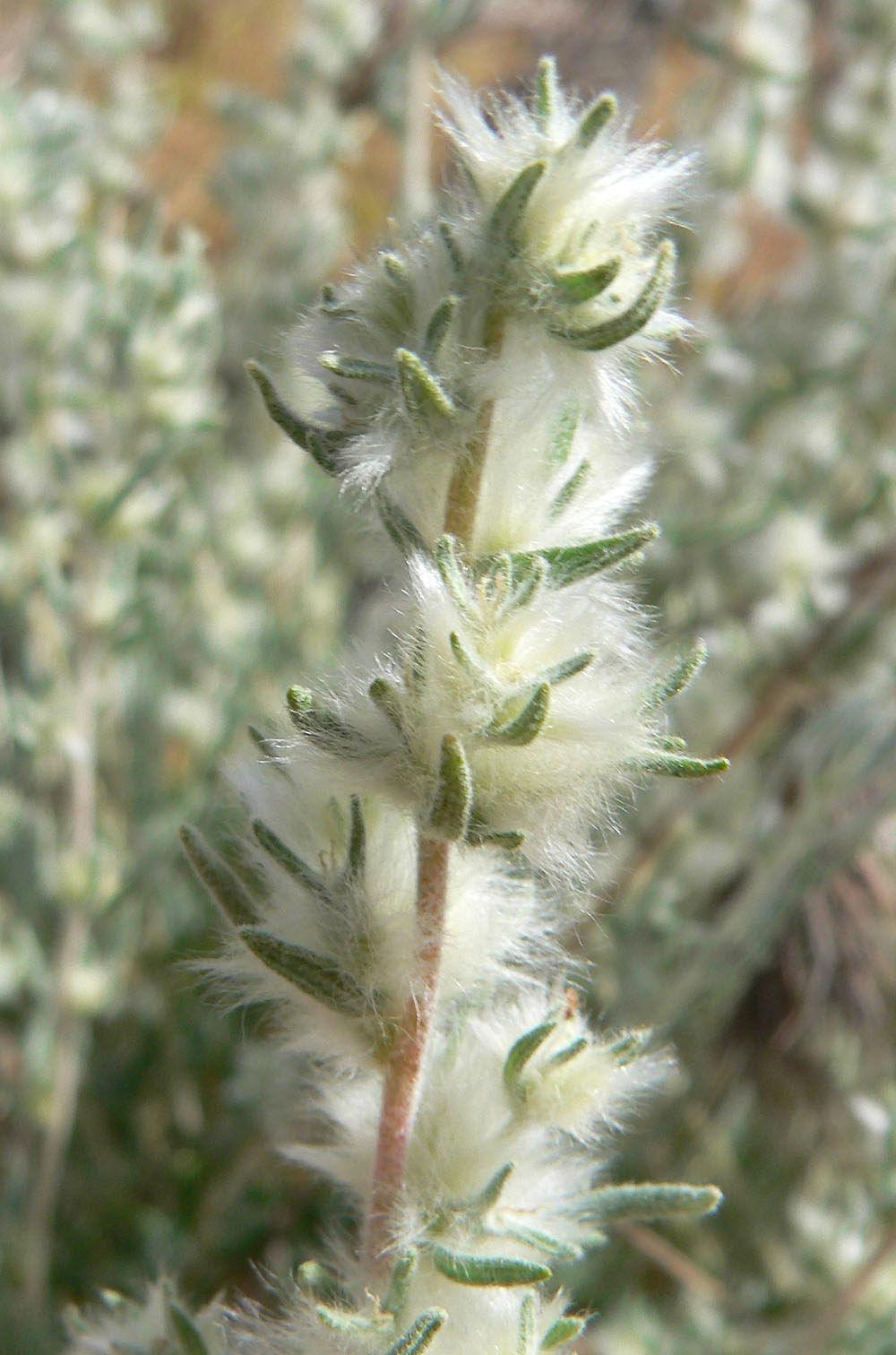
Krascheninnikovia lanata, tribe Axyrideae

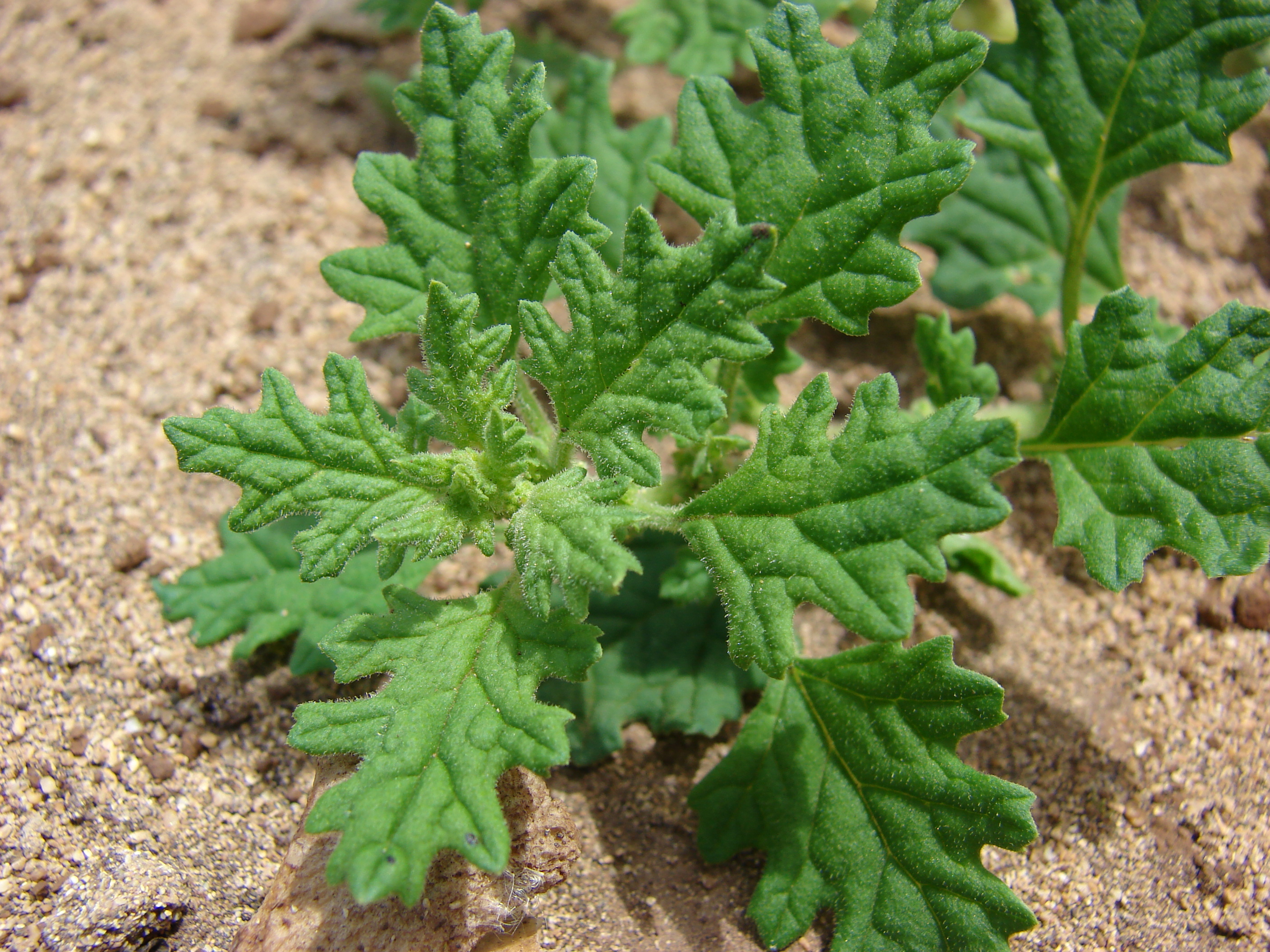
Dysphania carinata, tribe Dysphanieae

The genera of this subfamily were formerly classified in family Chenopodiaceae in the Cronquist system.

According to Fuentes-Bazan et al. (2012) and based on molecular genetic research, the subfamily comprises four tribes and includes about twenty-six genera:

- Tribus Anserineae Dumort. (Syn. Spinacieae), with two genera:
  - Spinacia L.: with three species in Western Asia and North Africa:
    - Spinach (Spinacia oleracea)
  - Blitum, with 12 species nearly worldwide, for example:
    - Blitum capitatum – Strawberry Blite (Syn. Chenopodium capitatum)
    - Blitum bonus-henricus – Good King Henry (Syn. Chenopodium bonus-henricus)
    - Blitum virgatum – leafy goosefoot (Syn. Chenopodium foliosum)
- Tribus Atripliceae C. A. Mey. (Syn. Chenopodieae Dumort.): Fuentes-Bazan et al. (2012) include here also Chenopodium and related genera, as Chenopodiastrum, Lipandra and Oxybasis.
  - Archiatriplex G.L.Chu, with only one species:
    - Archiatriplex nanpinensis G.L.Chu: endemic in the Chinese province Sichuan.
  - Atriplex L. - saltbush, orache (Syn.: Blackiella, Cremnophyton, Haloxanthium, Neopreissia, Obione, Pachypharynx, Senniella, Theleophyton), with about 300 species worldwide
  - Baolia H.W.Kung & G.L.Chu, with only one species:
    - Baolia bracteata H.W.Kung & G.L.Chu, endemic in the Chinese province Gansu.
  - Chenopodiastrum S. Fuentes, Uotila & Borsch: with five species, for example:
    - Chenopodiastrum hybridum (L.) S. Fuentes, Uotila & Borsch (Syn. Chenopodium hybridum L.)
    - Chenopodiastrum murale (L.) S. Fuentes, Uotila & Borsch – Sowbane, nettle-leaf goosefoot (Syn. Chenopodium murale L.)
    - Chenopodiastrum simplex (Torrey) S.Fuentes, Uotila & Borsch – Maple-leaf goosefoot (Syn.: Chenopodium simplex (Torrey) Raf.)
  - Chenopodium L. – goosefoot (sensu stricto, incl. Einadia Raf. and Rhagodia R.Br.): with about 90 species worldwide.
  - Exomis Fenzl ex Moq., with only one species:
    - Exomis microphylla (Thunb.) Aellen: a subshrub in southern and western Africa growing in gardens and hedges.
  - Extriplex E.H.Zacharias, with two species in western North America:
    - Extriplex californica (Moq.) E.H.Zacharias – California saltbush, California orache (Syn.: Atriplex californica Moq.)
    - Extriplex joaquinana (A.Nelson) E.H.Zacharias – San Joaquin saltbush, San Joaquin orach (Syn.: Atriplex joaquinana A.Nelson)
  - Grayia Hook. & Arn. – siltbush, hopsage (Syn. Zuckia Standl.), with four shrubby species in western North America, for example:
    - Grayia spinosa (Hook.) Moq. – spiny hopsage
  - Halimione Aellen – purslane, with three species in Europe and Western Asia, for example:
    - Halimione portulacoides (L.) Aellen (Syn.: Atriplex portulacoides L.) – sea purslane
  - Holmbergia Hicken, with only one species:
    - Holmbergia tweedii (Moq.) Speg., a shrub in Bolivia, Paraguay and Argentina.
  - Lipandra Moq.: with only one species:
    - Lipandra polysperma (L.) S. Fuentes, Uotila & Borsch (Syn. Chenopodium polyspermum L.) – many-seed goosefoot
  - Manochlamys Aellen, with only one species:
    - Manochlamys albicans Aellen: a subshrub in southern Africa, Namibia and Cape province, growing on rocky and sandy slopes, sand dunes and road sides.
  - Microgynoecium Hook.f., with only one species:
    - Microgynoecium tibeticum Hook.f.: in Tibet and Sikkim, growing in alpine meadows and on disturbed sites.
  - Micromonolepis Ulbr., with only one species:
    - Micromonolepis pusilla (Torr. ex S. Watson) Ulbr. – small povertyweed, in western North America
  - Oxybasis Kar. & Kir.: with five species, for example:
    - Oxybasis chenopodioides (L.) S. Fuentes, Uotila & Borsch – low goosefoot (Syn. Chenopodium chenopodioides (L.) Aellen)
    - Oxybasis glauca (L.) S. Fuentes, Uotila & Borsch – Oak-leaved goosefoot (Syn. Chenopodium glaucum L.)
    - Oxybasis rubra (L.) S. Fuentes, Uotila & Borsch – Red Goosefoot (Syn. Chenopodium rubrum L.)
  - Proatriplex (W.A.Weber) Stutz & G.L.Chu, with only one species:
    - Proatriplex pleiantha (W.A.Weber) Stutz & G.L.Chu, an annual herb from western North America.
  - Stutzia E.H.Zacharias (Syn. Endolepis Torr.), with two annual species in western North America:
    - Stutzia covillei (Standl.) E.H.Zacharias (Syn. Atriplex covillei (Standl.) J. F. Macbr., Endolepis covillei Standl)
    - Stutzia dioica (Nutt.) E.H.Zacharias (Syn. Atriplex suckleyi (Torrey) Rydberg, Endolepis suckleyi Torr.)
- Tribus Axyrideae (Heklau) G. Kadereit & A. Sukhor., with dendritic trichomes. three genera:
  - Axyris L., with about six species Central Asia, Himalaya and western China, for example:
    - Axyris amaranthoides L. – Russian pigweed, upright axyris
  - Ceratocarpus L., with two species in Europe and West Asia
  - Krascheninnikovia Gueldenst., with eight species in Eurasia and western North America, for example:
    - Krascheninnikovia lanata (Pursh) A.Meeuse & A.Smit – winterfat
- Tribus Dysphanieae:
  - Cycloloma Moq. (Syn.: Cyclolepis Moquin-Tandon) with only one species:
    - Cycloloma atriplicifolium (Sprengel) J.M.Coulter: widespread in Canada, USA and northern Mexico
  - Dysphania R.Br., with about 42 species worldwide, for example:
    - Dysphania ambrosioides – epazote
    - Dysphania anthelmintica – wormseed
  - Neomonolepis Sukhor., with one species, Neomonolepis spathulata, from western North America.
  - Suckleya A.Gray, with only one species:
    - Suckleya suckleyana (Torr.) Rydb., a succulent annual from western North America.
  - Teloxys Moq.: with only one species:
    - Teloxys aristata (L.) Moq. (Syn.: Chenopodium aristatum L., Dysphania aristata): from Eastern Europe to temperate Asia, naturalized elsewhere.

== Fossil record ==
The oldest fossil records for Chenopodioideae are pollen grains recovered from Maastrichtian sediments of the Edmonton Formation in Canada.
