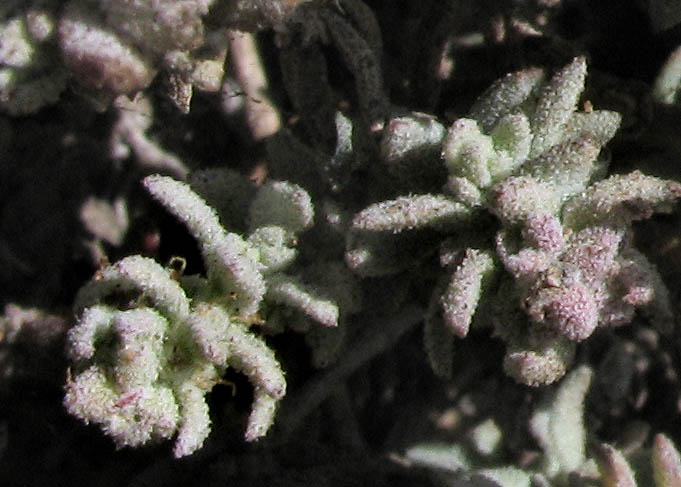
- Extriplex californica

Scientific classification
- Kingdom: Plantae
- Clade: Tracheophytes
- Clade: Angiosperms
- Clade: Eudicots
- Order: Caryophyllales
- Family: Amaranthaceae
- Subfamily: Chenopodioideae
- Tribe: Atripliceae

Genera
- Archiatriplex G.L.Chu; Atriplex L.; Chenopodiastrum S. Fuentes, Uotila & Borsch; Chenopodium L. (sensu stricto, incl. Einadia Raf. and Rhagodia R.Br.); Exomis Fenzl ex Moq.; Extriplex E.H.Zacharias; Grayia Hook. & Arn.; Holmbergia Hicken; Lipandra Moq.; Manochlamys Aellen; Microgynoecium Hook.f.; Micromonolepis Ulbr.; Oxybasis Kar. & Kir.; Proatriplex (W.A.Weber) Stutz & G.L.Chu; Stutzia E.H.Zacharias (Syn. Endolepis Torr.)

= Atripliceae =

Tribe of flowering plants

Atripliceae is a tribe of the subfamily Chenopodioideae belonging to the plant family Amaranthaceae. Atriplex is the largest genus of the tribe. Species of Atripliceae are ecologically important in steppe and semi-desert climates.

== Distribution ==
Most of the species are distributed in Africa, Australia, and North America, with some others spread out worldwide.

== Taxonomy ==
Traditional taxonomy of Atripliceae based on morphological features has been controversial. Molecular studies have found that many genera are not true clades. One such study found that Atripliceae could be divided into two main clades, Archiatriplex, with a few, scattered species, and the larger Atriplex clade, which is highly diverse and found around the world.
