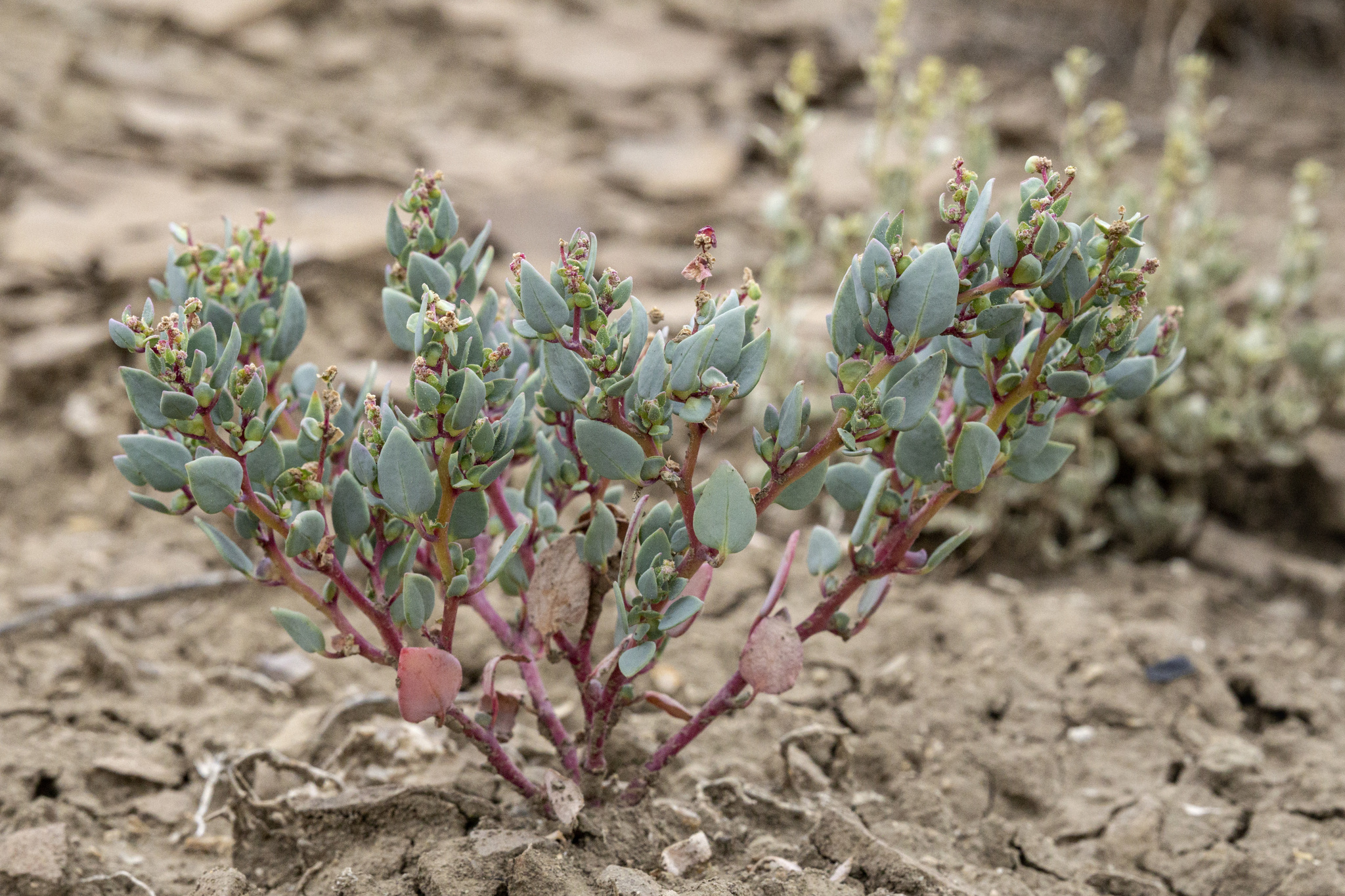
- Proatriplex pleiantha Sandoval County, New Mexico, USA

Conservation status
- Vulnerable (NatureServe)

Scientific classification
- Kingdom: Plantae
- Clade: Tracheophytes
- Clade: Angiosperms
- Clade: Eudicots
- Order: Caryophyllales
- Family: Amaranthaceae
- Subfamily: Chenopodioideae
- Tribe: Atripliceae
- Genus: Proatriplex (W.A.Weber) Stutz & G.L.Chu
- Species: P. pleiantha

Binomial name
- Proatriplex pleiantha (W.A.Weber) Stutz & G.L.Chu (1990)

Synonyms
- Atriplex pleiantha W.A.Weber (1950); Atriplex subg. Proatriplex W.A.Weber; Atriplex sect. Pleianthae S.L.Welsh

= Proatriplex =

Genus of plants

Proatriplex is a monotypic plant genus in the subfamily Chenopodioideae of the family Amaranthaceae, with the only species Proatriplex pleiantha (syn. Atriplex pleiantha). It is known by the common names four-corners orach and Mancos shadscale. It occurs in the Navajo Basin of Arizona, Colorado, New Mexico, and Utah.

== Description ==
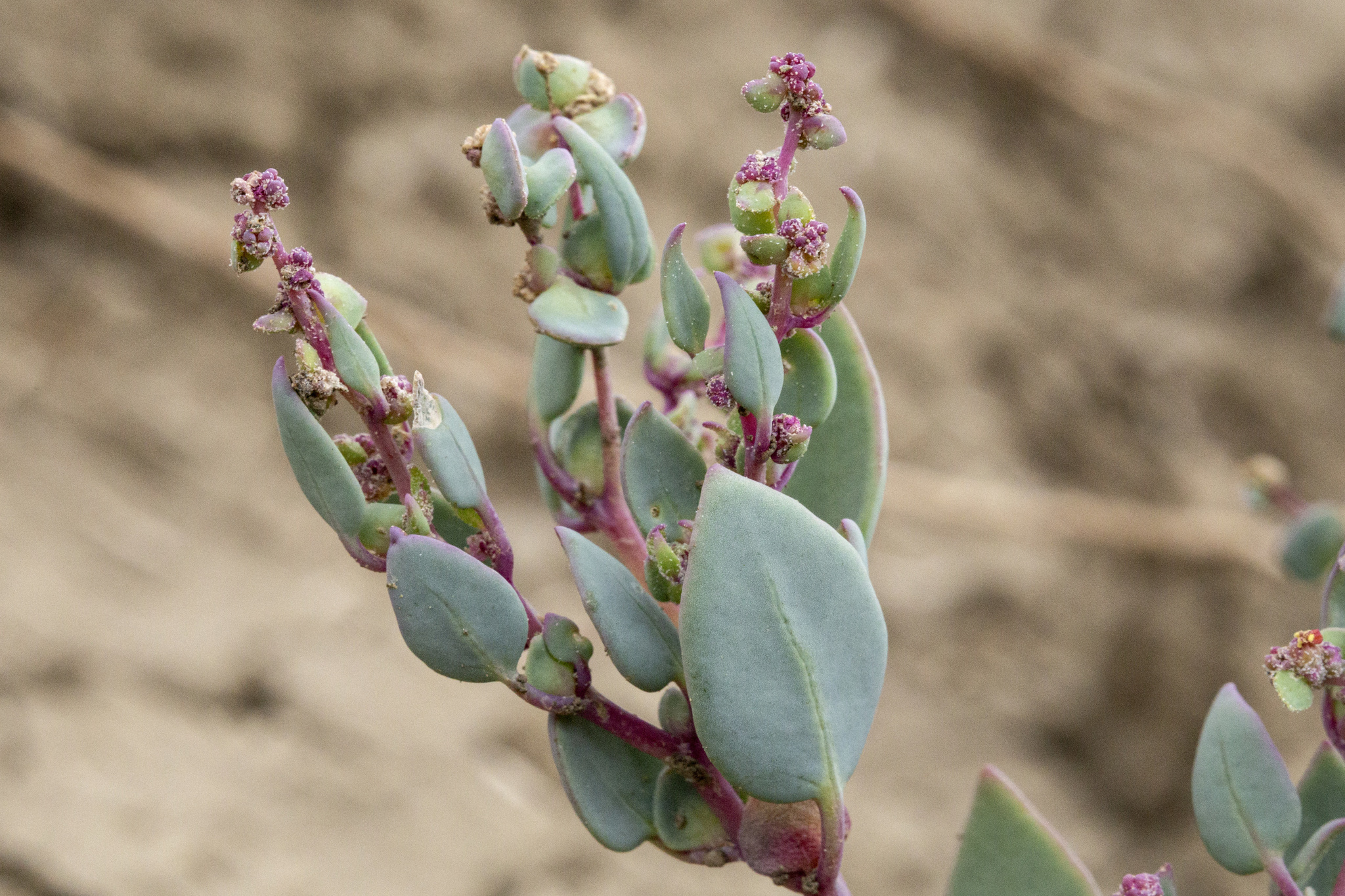
Proatriplex pleiantha detail of leaves and flowers

Proatriplex pleiantha is an annual plant of 5–17 cm, glabrous, sometimes slightly farinose. The erect stems are branched from base with white-yellow or reddish ascending branches. The alternate or sometimes nearly opposite leaves are petiolate. The succulent, bright green leaf blades of 5–28 mm length and width are ovate to suborbiculate with entire margins. The leaf anatomy is of the "normal" (non-Kranz) type of C3-plants.

The plants are monoecious. The inflorescences either contain mixed male and female flowers, or consist of interrupted, terminal spikes of glomerulated male flowers, and female flowers standing in the leaf axils. Male flowers (without bracteoles) consist of 5 perianth lobes, ca. 1–1.5 mm long, united in the lower half, with cucullate tips, and 5 exserting stamens inserting on a disc. Female flowers are sitting in groups of 2–6 within 2 opposite bracteoles, they consist of a hyaline perianth of 5 scale-like, lanceolate to ovate tepals of 1–1.5 mm, and an ovary with 2 filiform, slightly exserted stigmas.

In fruit, the bracteoles enclosing the fruits become accrescent, 3–7 mm long and broad, slightly connate in the lower half. Their shape is triangular-ovate to orbiculate, with sessile or shortly stipitate bases and entire margins. Their surface is glabrous, without tubercles. The suborbicular to obovoid, laterally compressed fruit (utricle) is nearly equal in length to perianth and falls at maturity. The membranous pericarp adheres to the seed. The vertically orientated seed has a black, smooth and shining, crustaceous seed coat. The annular embryo surrounds the copious farinaceous perisperm.

Proatriplex pleiantha is flowering from May to June.

The chromosome numbers are n = 9 (haploid) and 2n = 18 (diploid).

== Systematics ==
Proatriplex belongs to the tribe Atripliceae in the subfamily Chenopodioideae of the family Amaranthaceae.

Proatriplex has been first described in 1950 by William Alfred Weber at the rank of a subgenus of Atriplex (in: Madroño 10(6): p. 188–189). In 1990, it was raised to genus level by Howard Coombs Stutz & Ge Lin Chu (in: American Journal of Botany 77(3), p. 364). The genus is monotypic, comprising only Proatriplex pleiantha (W.A. Weber) Stutz & G.L. Chu.. This species was later again included in genus Atriplex. Phylogenetic research revealed it to be distinct from most Atriplex species, being more closely related to other endemic North American genera of Atripliceae.

== Distribution ==
Proatriplex pleiantha is endemic to the Navajo Basin of Arizona, Colorado, New Mexico, and Utah. It is very common in desert badlands, and occurs often in pure stands on saline clay soils of depressions, or together with other halophytes in salt desert shrubs. It grows at altitudes of 1400–1500 m.
