= Grayia =

Grayia may refer to:

- Grayia (snake), a genus of African water snakes
- Grayia (plant), a genus of desert shrubs in the family Amaranthaceae
