= Coleophora unipunctella =

Scientific classification
- Kingdom: Animalia
- Phylum: Arthropoda
- Clade: Pancrustacea
- Class: Insecta
- Order: Lepidoptera
- Family: Coleophoridae
- Genus: Coleophora
- Species: C. unipunctella

Binomial name
- Coleophora unipunctella Zeller, 1849

Synonyms
- Coleophora nigrostigmatella Heeger, 1853; Coleophora zelleri Nowicki, 1860

Species of moth

Coleophora unipunctella is a moth of the family Coleophoridae. It is found from France and Spain to Romania and from Germany, Poland and Lithuania to Italy and Hungary. It is also known from southern Russia. It occurs in forest-steppe.

Adults are on wing in June and July.

The larvae feed on Chenopodium hybridum and Atriplex species. They feed on the generative organs of their host plant.
