= Chenopodiastrum selvagense =

Scientific classification
- Kingdom: Plantae
- Clade: Tracheophytes
- Clade: Angiosperms
- Clade: Eudicots
- Order: Caryophyllales
- Family: Amaranthaceae
- Genus: Chenopodiastrum
- Species: C. selvagense

Binomial name
- Chenopodiastrum selvagense Uotila

Species of flowering plant

Chenopodiastrum selvagense is a species of flowering plant in the family Amaranthaceae. It is endemic to the Savage Islands and Desertas Islands in Macaronesia.
