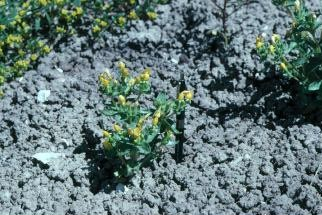
- Mentzelia mollis

Conservation status
- Imperiled (NatureServe)

Scientific classification
- Kingdom: Plantae
- Clade: Tracheophytes
- Clade: Angiosperms
- Clade: Eudicots
- Clade: Asterids
- Order: Cornales
- Family: Loasaceae
- Genus: Mentzelia
- Species: M. mollis

Binomial name
- Mentzelia mollis M.Peck

= Mentzelia mollis =

Species of flowering plant

Mentzelia mollis is a species of flowering plant in the Loasaceae known by the common names soft blazingstar, smooth blazingstar, and smooth stickleaf. It is native to the western United States, where it occurs in Idaho, Oregon, and Nevada.

== Description ==
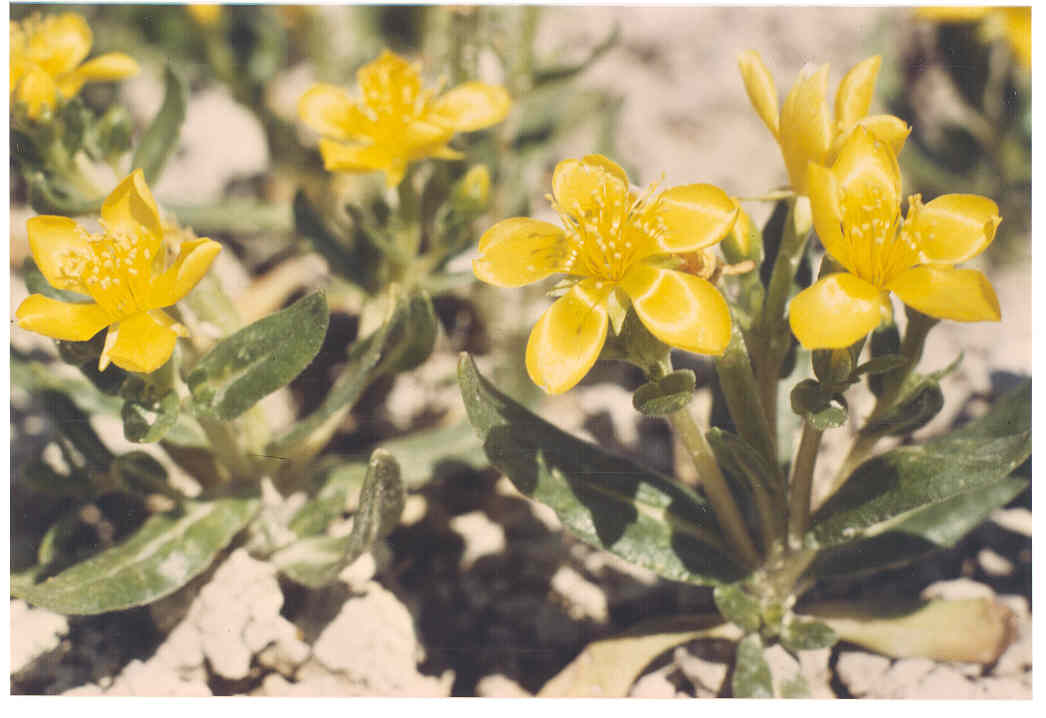
Mentzelia mollis flowers

This annual herb grows 5 to 12 centimeters tall with a thick, branching, erect stem. The leaves are lance-shaped and mostly smooth-edged. It produces flowers with bright yellow flowers with petals about a centimeter long and with many stamens in the middle. Flowering occurs in May and June. The flowers are visited by bumblebees. The fruit is a four-sided capsule about 2.5 centimeters long.

This plant grows on deposits of montmorillonite, a slick, powdery clay soil. It also grows on volcanic ash soils high in potassium. The substrate is also high in calcium and sodium. Summer soil temperatures are hot. The soils are mostly barren of vegetation but may host other annuals such as Monolepis pusilla, Mentzelia albicaulis, Cleomella macbrideana, and Phacelia humilis. Only 10 to 12 inches of annual precipitation falls in the area.

This species is distributed in Malheur County, Oregon, Owyhee County, Idaho, and Humboldt County, Nevada. Threats include habitat destruction from mining activity and off-road vehicle use.
