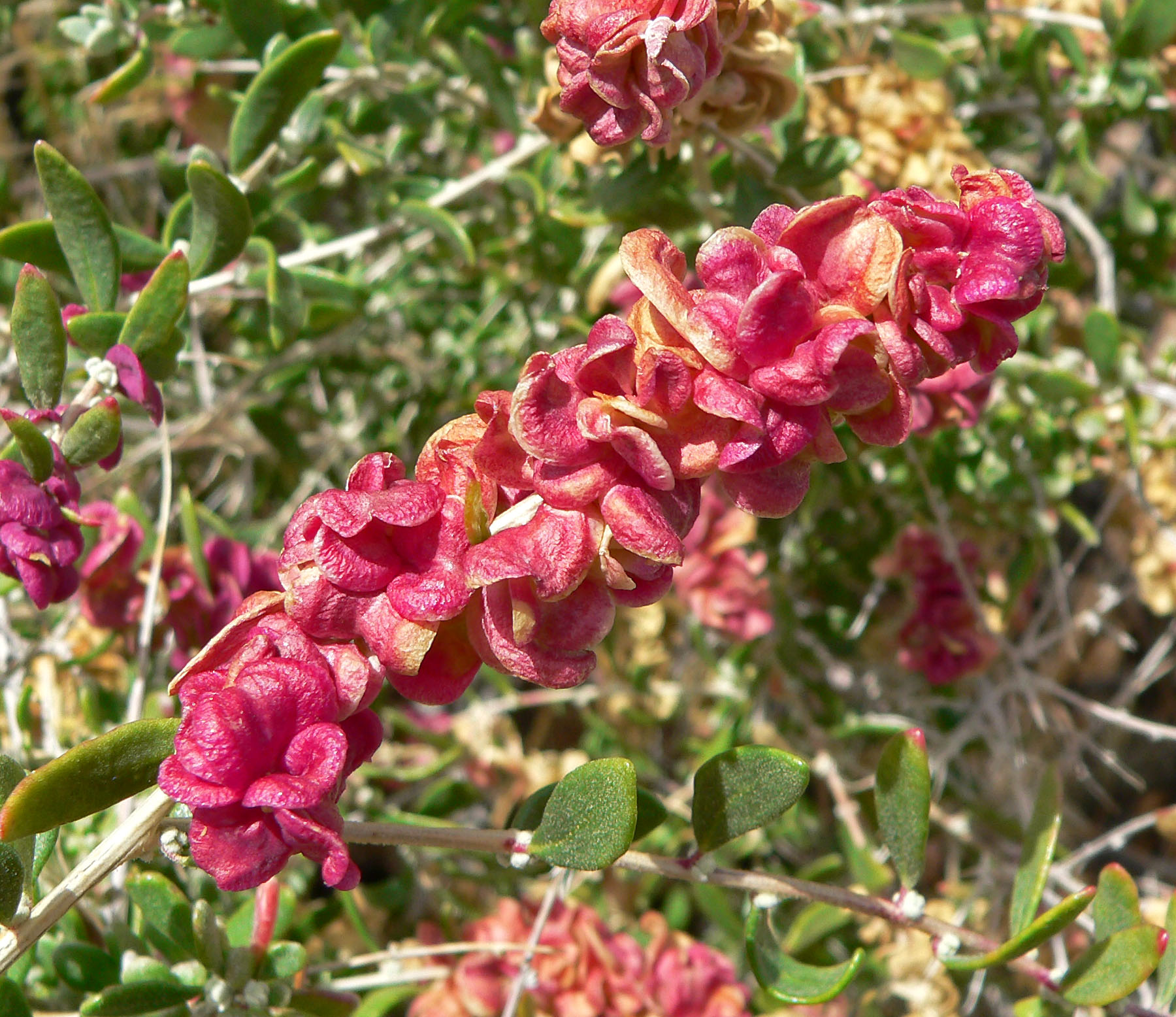

Conservation status
- Secure (NatureServe)

Scientific classification
- Kingdom: Plantae
- Clade: Tracheophytes
- Clade: Angiosperms
- Clade: Eudicots
- Order: Caryophyllales
- Family: Amaranthaceae
- Genus: Grayia
- Species: G. spinosa

Binomial name
- Grayia spinosa (Hook.) Moq.

Synonyms
- Grayia polygaloides Hook. & Arn. (nom. illeg.); Chenopodium spinosum Hook.; Atriplex grayi Collotzi ex W. A. Weber (not Atriplex spinosa D. Dietr)

= Grayia spinosa =

Species of flowering plant

Grayia spinosa is a species of the genus Grayia in the subfamily Chenopodioideae of the flowering plant family Amaranthaceae, which is known by the common names hop sage and spiny hop sage. It is widely distributed across the Western United States, where it grows in a number of desert and mountain habitats.

== Description ==
Grayia spinosa is a small, multibranched, brambly shrub 30-100 (150) cm in height. The stems are reddish brown with whitish ribs, the older bark is dark gray. The lateral branches are stiff with spiny, pointed ends. During the growing season the branches are covered in small flat to scooplike alternate leaves of 1-2.5(-4.2) cm × 1.5-6(-10) mm, with green oval-shaped leaf blades and often with whitish tips.

The plants are dioecious (rarely monoecious). Male individuals are flowering in clumps of a few flowers in the axils of leaflike bracts. Male flowers comprise 4(-5) perianth lobes of 1.5–2 mm, equaling or a bit longer than the 4-5 stamens, with filaments shorter than the anthers. Female inflorescences with one- or few-flowered glomerules of pistillate flowers, surrounded by 2 completely united bracteoles, without perianth, consisting of an ovary with 2 stigmas, that protrude through the opening in the covering bracteoles.

In fruit, the orbicular to broadly elliptic bracteoles enlarge up to 7.5-14 × 6–12 mm and form a flattened wing-like structure. They become bright pink to red-tinged, yellowish green, or whitish, making the plant one of the more colorful shrubs in the springtime habitat. The enclosed fruit (utricle) is brown, 1.5–2 mm, with free pericarp. The vertically orientated seed is compressed-lenticular and has a brown, tuberculate seed coat. The annular embryo surrounds the copious perisperm.

The chromosome number is 2n = 36.

The shrub sheds its leaves and flowers by the summer in hot or dry areas and becomes a woody gray thicket; it is evergreen in some regions.

== Distribution ==
Grayia spinosa is widely distributed across the Western United States and is native in Colorado, Idaho, Montana, Oregon, Washington, Wyoming, Arizona, California, Nevada and Utah. It grows in valleys and on foothills from 500 to 2,400 m (1,640 to 7,870 ft), on dry, alkaline or scarcely alkaline soils, in sagebrush, shadscale, or creosote bush communities.

== Taxonomy ==
The species was first described in 1838 by William Jackson Hooker as Chenopodium spinosum Hook. (In: Flora Boreali-Americana 2(9), p. 127). In 1840, William Jackson Hooker and George Arnott Walker-Arnott moved it to a separate genus, Grayia (in: The Botany of Captain Beechey's Voyage (p. 387–388)[3]), but they used the illegitimate name Grayia polygaloides Hook. & Arn. In 1849, Alfred Moquin-Tandon made the valid combination as Grayia spinosa (Hook.) Moq. (in Candolle: Prodromus Systematis Naturalis Regni Vegetabilis 13(2), p. 119).
