= Neomonolepis =

Scientific classification
- Kingdom: Plantae
- Clade: Tracheophytes
- Clade: Angiosperms
- Clade: Eudicots
- Order: Caryophyllales
- Family: Amaranthaceae
- Subfamily: Chenopodioideae
- Tribe: Dysphanieae
- Genus: Neomonolepis; Sukhor. (2018)
- Species: N. spathulata

Binomial name
- Neomonolepis spathulata (A.Gray) Sukhor. (2018)

Synonyms
- Blitum spathulatum (A.Gray) S.Fuentes, Uotila & Borsch (2012); Monolepis spathulata A.Gray (1868)

Genus of flowering plants

Neomonolepis spathulata is a species of flowering plant in the amaranth family, Amaranthaceae. It is the only species in the genus Neomonolepis. It is an annual native to Baja California, California, Nevada, and Oregon in western North America.

It is an herbaceous annual, growing 2 to 20 cm tall. Plants may be trailing or erect. leaves are fleshy and entire, 3 to 25 mm long, and narrowly oblanceolate to spoon-shaped. Flowers appear in June to September, and grow in clusters of 4 to 15 or more.

Typical habitats are moist mountain streambanks and meadows from 2,000 to 3,450 meters elevation. In California it grows on the eastern and western slopes of the high Sierra Nevada and in the San Bernardino Mountains.
