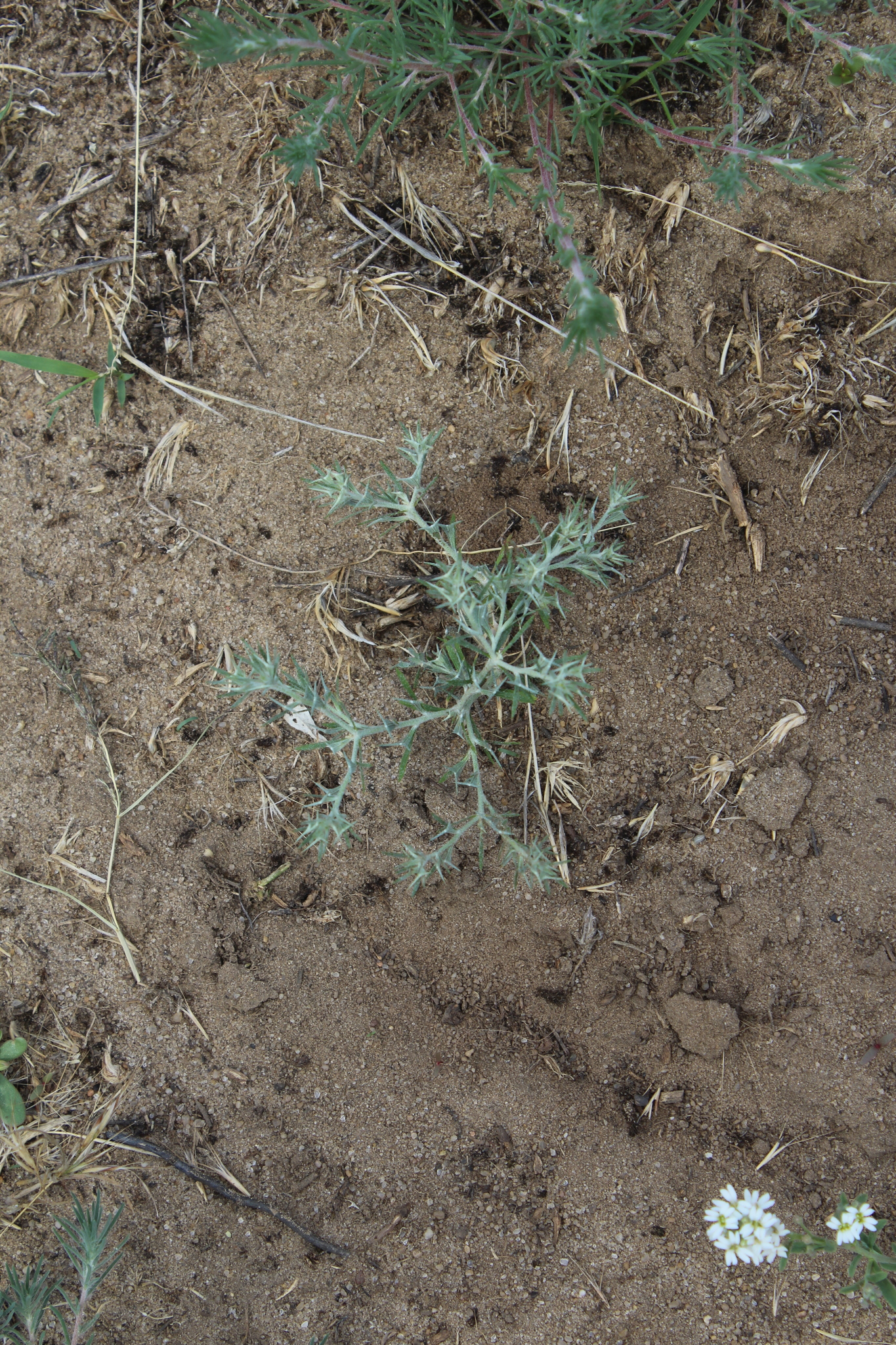
- Ceratocarpus arenarius

Scientific classification
- Kingdom: Plantae
- Clade: Embryophytes
- Clade: Tracheophytes
- Clade: Angiosperms
- Clade: Eudicots
- Order: Caryophyllales
- Family: Amaranthaceae
- Subfamily: Chenopodioideae
- Tribe: Axyrideae
- Genus: Ceratocarpus; L.
- Species: C. arenarius

Binomial name
- Ceratocarpus arenarius L.

= Ceratocarpus =

Genus of flowering plants

Ceratocarpus is a genus of flowering plants in the family Amaranthaceae. It has only one currently accepted species, Ceratocarpus arenarius, found in Bulgaria, Romania, Crimea, Russia, Anatolia, the Caucasus, Iran, Afghanistan, Pakistan, Central Asia, the Altai, western Siberia, Xinjiang in China, and Mongolia. A bushy herbaceous plant, no more than 30 cm (12 in) tall (or wide), it is a valuable fodder for sheep, goats and horses, and it grows well in degraded and trampled soils.

== Species ==
Only one species is currently accepted, Ceratocarpus arenarius, but a number of names have been previously associated with Ceratocarpus:

- Ceratocarpus arenarius subsp. utriculosus (Bluket ex Krylov) Takht.
- Ceratocarpus caput-medusae Bluket
- Ceratocarpus maritimus Pall. ex M.Bieb.
- Ceratocarpus salinus Pall.
- Ceratocarpus turkestanicus Sav.-Rycz.
- Ceratocarpus utriculosus Bluket ex Krylov
