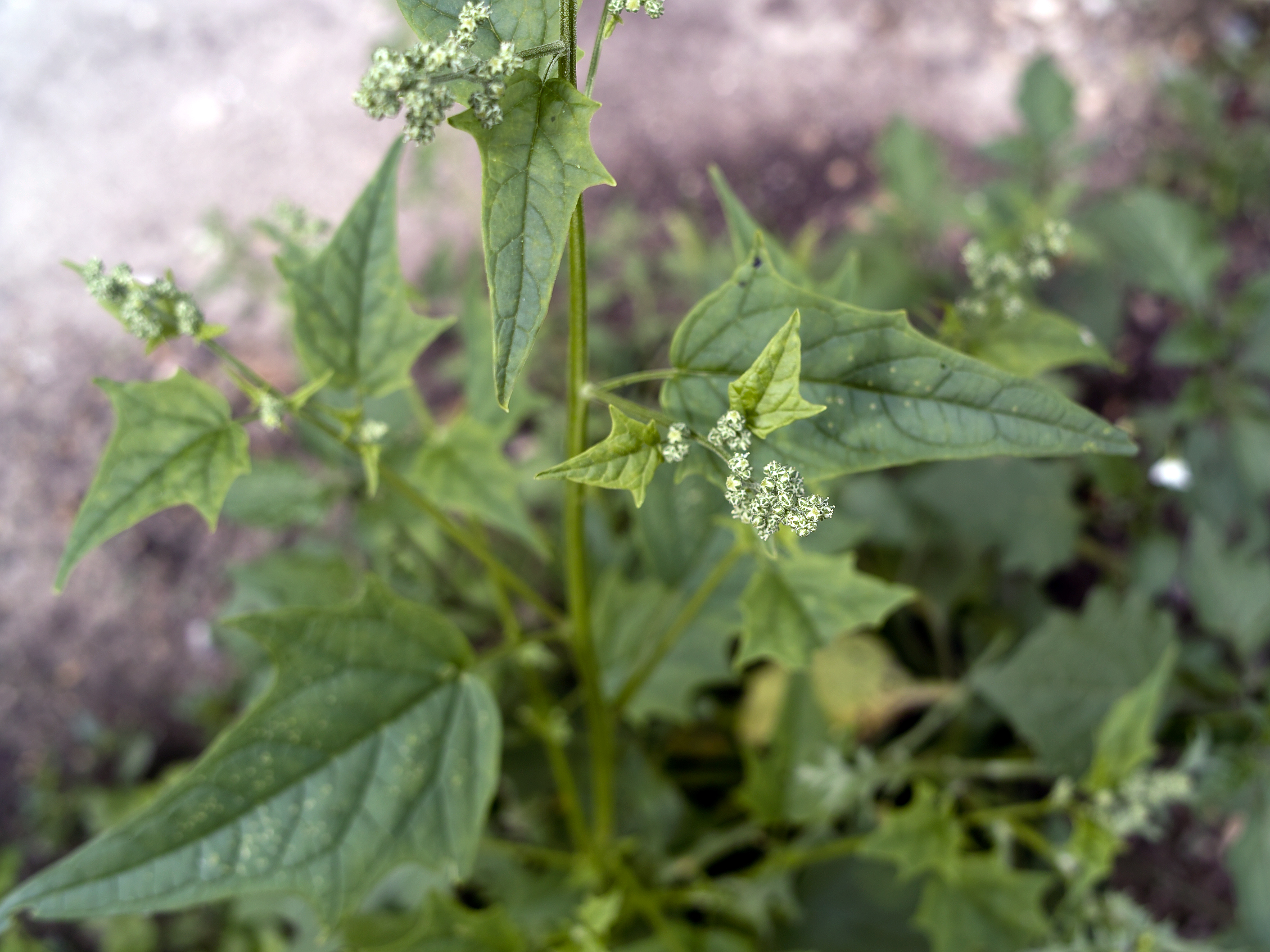

Scientific classification
- Kingdom: Plantae
- Clade: Embryophytes
- Clade: Tracheophytes
- Clade: Angiosperms
- Clade: Eudicots
- Order: Caryophyllales
- Family: Amaranthaceae
- Subfamily: Chenopodioideae
- Tribe: Atripliceae
- Genus: Chenopodiastrum
- Species: C. hybridum

Binomial name
- Chenopodiastrum hybridum (L.) S.Fuentes, Uotila & Borsch

Synonyms
- List: Atriplex hybrida Crantz; Blitum hybridum (L.) Theodorova; Botrys hybridus (L.) Nieuwl.; Chenopodium angulatum Curtis ex Steud.; Chenopodium angulosum Lam.; Chenopodium hybridum L.; Chenopodium serotinum Suter; Chenopodium stramoniifolium Chev.; Polycnemum hybridum Andrz. ex Trautv.; Vulvaria stramoniifolia (Chev.) Bubani

= Chenopodiastrum hybridum =

Species of plant

Chenopodiastrum hybridum is a species of flowering plant in the family Amaranthaceae. It is native to Europe and Asia.
