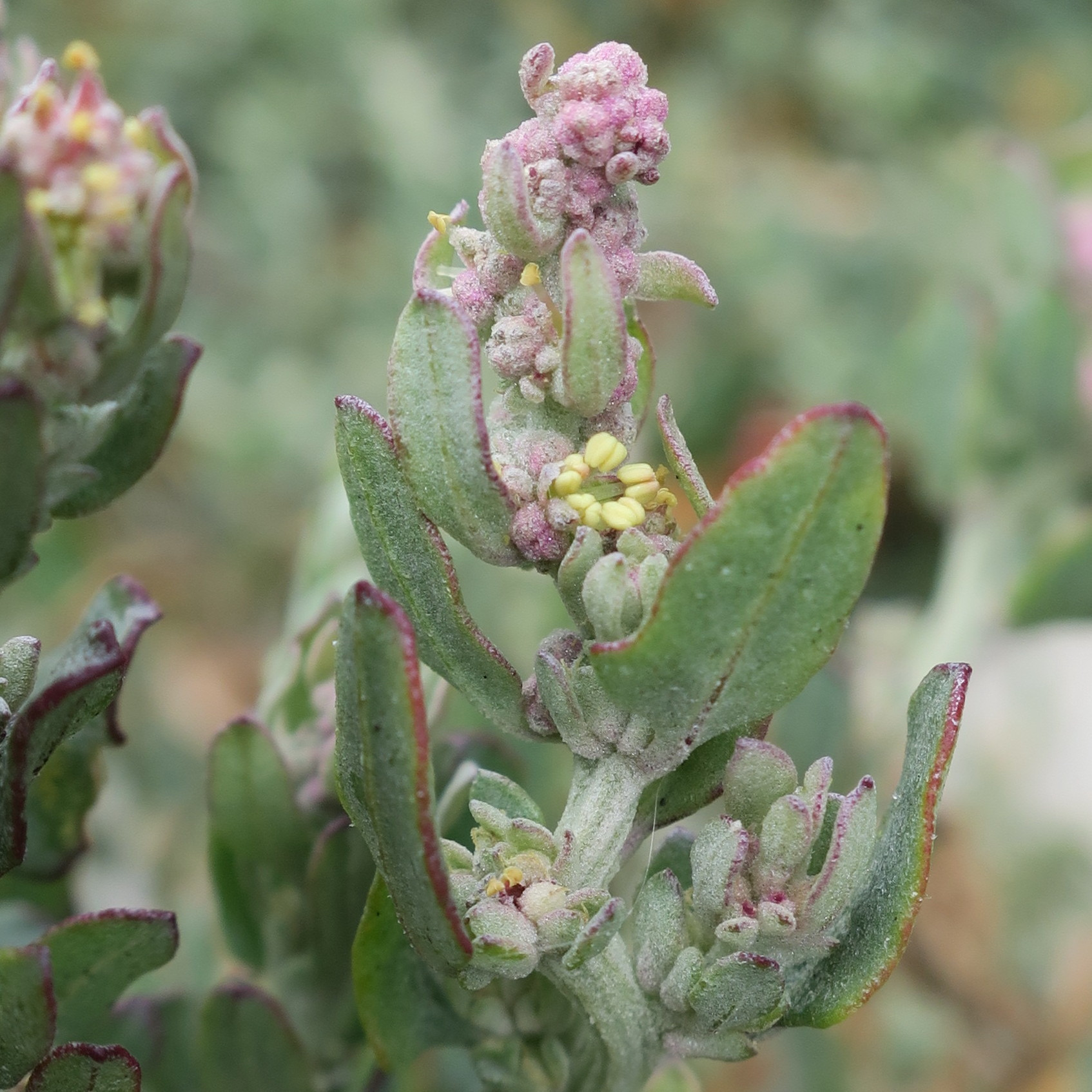

Scientific classification
- Kingdom: Plantae
- Clade: Tracheophytes
- Clade: Angiosperms
- Clade: Eudicots
- Order: Caryophyllales
- Family: Amaranthaceae
- Subfamily: Chenopodioideae
- Tribe: Atripliceae
- Genus: Exomis; Fenzl ex Moq.
- Species: E. microphylla

Binomial name
- Exomis microphylla (Thunb.) Aellen

Synonyms
- Chenopodium microphyllum Thunb.

= Exomis microphylla =

Species of flowering plant

Exomis is a genus of flowering plants belonging to the family Amaranthaceae. It just contains one species, Exomis microphylla (Thunb.) Aellen It is also in the Chenopodioideae subfamily.

== Description ==
They are shrubs with dichotomous branching (forking into two equal branches), monoecious with few bisexual flowers (with male and female reproductive structures in separate flowers but on the same plant). The staminate flowers (male flowers) are in clusters, these forming terminal spikes with a 5-lobed perianth. It has 5 stamens, with the filaments basally fused. The pistillate flowers (female flowers) are irregularly dispersed between the staminate ones. They are surrounded by 2 cylindrical bracteoles (small modified leaves) accrescent (increasing in size) when in fruit. The fruit (or seed capsule), is beaked at the top with the pericarp (wall of the fruit) fleshy and adherent (linked). The seeds are vertical with the embryo annular (circle or ring shaped). With the radicle (root) pointing downward.

== Ecology ==
The larva of Brephidium metophis, (the tinktinkie blue), a butterfly feed on the plant.

The bush Karoo rat (Otomys unisulcatus), builds its nests, dome-shaped stick shelters or lodges, using the plant stems of Exomis.

== Taxonomy ==
In Khoi is known as 'Hondebos'.

The genus name of Exomis is derived from Greek word exomis or exomidos meaning a 'a man's vest without sleeves'.

The Latin specific epithet of microphylla means small leaved. It was first published in Chenop. Monogr. Enum. on page 49 in 1840. The species of Exomis microphylla was published in Bot. Jahrb. Syst. Vol.70 on page 375 in 1939.

There is a known variant Exomis microphylla var. microphylla (with its own synonym of Atriplex microphylla Willd.).

The genus is recognized by the United States Department of Agriculture and the Agricultural Research Service and they do list all known species and all known variants.

== Distribution ==
It is native to South Africa, it is found in the provinces of the Cape Provinces and Free State and also in Namibia. arid areas

The shrub can be found growing on low-lying sandy areas with other plants such as; Zygophyllum cordiflorum, Z. flexuosum, Z. morgsana, Atriplex semibaccata, Ruschia geminiflora, Ehrharta calycina, Muraltia dumosa, Searsia glauca, Limonium perigrinum, Restio oleocharis and Euclea racemosa.

== Uses ==
Exomis microphylla is known as 'unvenyathi' and used as a folk medicine in Alice, South Africa, a leaf decoction is used in a remedy for endometritis and vaginitis. The Cape Khoi people used the leaf decoctions with milk to remedy for epilepsy, winds, cramps and also convulsions in infants.
