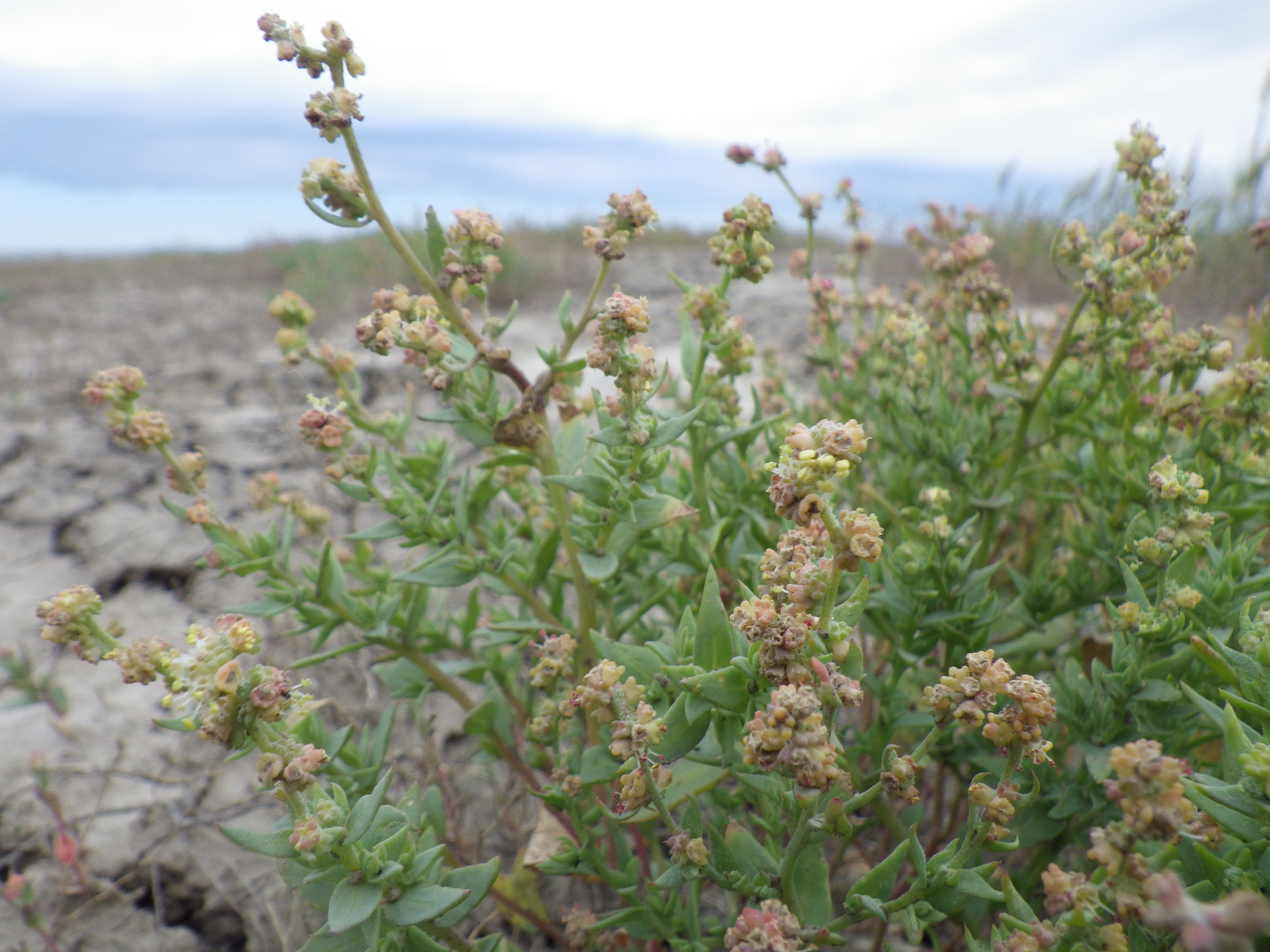
- Stutzia dioica

Scientific classification
- Kingdom: Plantae
- Clade: Tracheophytes
- Clade: Angiosperms
- Clade: Eudicots
- Order: Caryophyllales
- Family: Amaranthaceae
- Tribe: Atripliceae
- Genus: Stutzia; E.H.Zacharias

Species
- See text.

Synonyms
- Endolepis Torr (nom. illeg.); Atriplex sect. Endolepis McNeill; Atriplex L. sect. Covilleiae S. L. Welsh

= Stutzia =

Genus of plants

Stutzia is a plant genus in the subfamily Chenopodioideae of the family Amaranthaceae. It was described in 2010, replacing the illegitimate name Endolepis. It comprises two species, that have also been included in the genus Atriplex.

Stutzia species occur in western North America. They are annual plants up to 50 cm tall and broad, growing upright or spreading. The parts of young plants are rarely furfuraceous or farinose, older ones glabrescent. The stem branches almost from the base with ascending or spreading branches, older ones with white bark.

== Description ==
The species of Stutzia are annual herbs that are 3–50 cm high and broad, growing erect or spreading. Young plant parts are sparsely furfuraceous or farinose, older ones glabrescent. The stems are branched nearly from base with ascending or spreading branches, the older ones with whitish bark. The numerous green leaves are alternate, petiolated or not. Their succulent leaf blades are 7–50 long and 2–30 mm wide, triangular-hastate, broadly ovate, lanceolate-ovate, lanceolate, or elliptic, with entire margins. The leaf anatomy is of the "normal" (non-Kranz) type of C3-plants.

The plants are monoecious. The inflorescences form terminal, dense or interrupted spikes of glomerulate male and often female flowers, and female flowers standing to 1–6 in the axils of midstem leaves. Male flowers (without bracteoles) consist of 5 triangular to subulate perianth lobes, ca. 1–2 mm long, united in the lower half to 3/4, smooth or with a fleshy crest, and 5 exserting stamens inserting on a disc. Female flowers are sitting within 2 opposite bracteoles, they consist of a hyaline perianth of 1–5 distinct, entire or lobed tepals, and an ovary with 2 filiform, slightly exserted stigmas.

In fruit, the bracteoles enclosing the fruit become accrescent, 2–20 × 1–10 mm, connate at least to the middle or to the summit. Their shape can be either ovate and entire or ovate-cordate to lanceolate, and laterally lobed at base, with acute to acuminate apices. Their surface is scurfy, usually without tubercles. The ovate, laterally compressed to subglobose fruit (utricle) greatly surpassing the perianth is not spongy, and does not fall at maturity. The membranous pericarp adheres to the seed. The vertically orientated seed with rostellate apex has a brown to dark reddish-brown, thin, crustaceous seed coat. The subannular, slender embryo surrounds the copious perisperm.

Stutzia is flowering from April to July.

The chromosome numbers are n = 9 (haploid) and 2n = 18 (diploid).

== Systematics ==
The genus Stutzia has been first described in 2010 by Elizabeth H. Zacharias (In: A Molecular Phylogeny of North American Atripliceae (Chenopodiaceae), with Implications for Floral and Photosynthetic Pathway Evolution. In: Systematic Botany 35 (4), p. 839-857). It replaced the illegitimate name Endolepis, that had been described in 1860 by John Torrey (not being aware of the earlier fossil Endolepis Schleid. from 1846). The type species is Stutzia dioica. Stutzia species were often included in genus Atriplex. The genus name Stutzia was given in honour to the botanist Howard C. Stutz, who had resurrected Endolepis in 1993.

Stutzia belongs to the tribe Atripliceae in the subfamily Chenopodioideae of the family Amaranthaceae.

=== Species ===
The genus comprises two species:

- Stutzia covillei (Standl.) E.H.Zacharias - Coville's orach (Synonyms Atriplex covillei (Standl.) J.F.Macbr., Endolepis covillei Standl.)
- Stutzia dioica (Nutt.) E.H.Zacharias - Suckley's orach (Syn. Kochia dioica Nutt., Salsola dioica (Nutt.) Spreng., Endolepis dioica (Nutt.) Standl., Atriplex dioica (Nutt.) J.F.Macbr., Atriplex suckleyi (Torrey) Rydberg, Endolepis suckleyi Torr., Endolepis ovata Rydb., Atriplex ovata (Rydb.) Clem. & E.G.Clem.)

== Distribution ==
The species of Stutzia are distributed in western North America (Alberta, Saskatchewan, California, Colorado, Montana, Nevada, North Dakota, South Dakota, Wyoming, and possibly Oregon).

They grow in dry habitats on alkaline or saline substrates, from 400 to 2,200 m. Stutzia dioica is more widely distributed, and is a pioneer on alkaline or saline, fine-textured soils in badlands. Sometimes it occurs together with Atriplex species, sagebrush, or grasses. Stutzia covillei grows on saline soils in saltbush, greasewood, rabbitbrush, warm desert scrub, and salt-grass communities.
