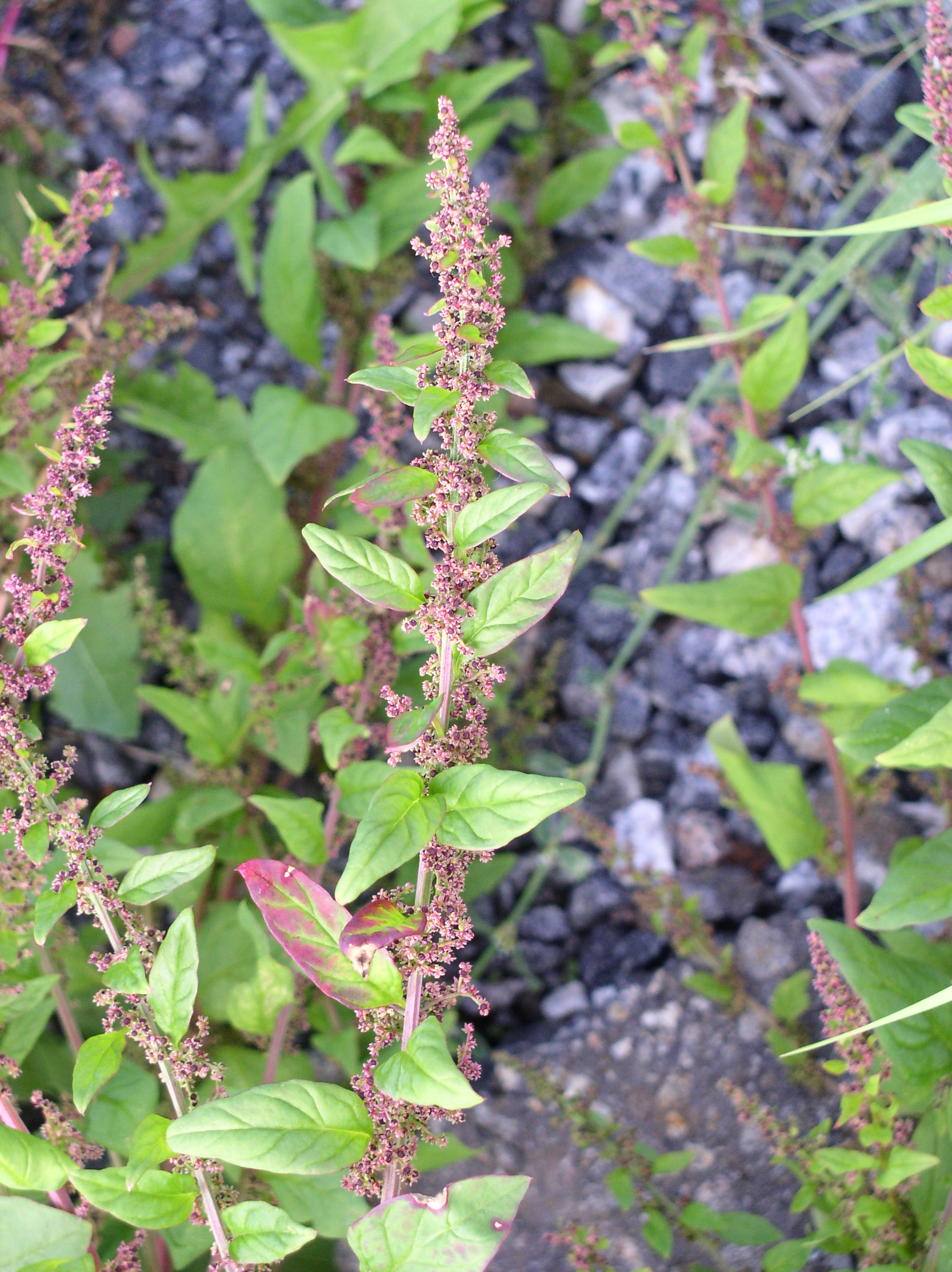
- Manyseed goosefoot (Lipandra polysperma)

Scientific classification
- Kingdom: Plantae
- Clade: Tracheophytes
- Clade: Angiosperms
- Clade: Eudicots
- Order: Caryophyllales
- Family: Amaranthaceae
- Subfamily: Chenopodioideae
- Tribe: Atripliceae
- Genus: Lipandra; Moq.
- Species: L. polysperma

Binomial name
- Lipandra polysperma (L.) S. Fuentes, Uotila & Borsch

Synonyms
- Chenopodium polyspermum L.; Atriplex polysperma (L.) Crantz; Vulvaria polysperma (L.) Bubani; Lipandra atriplicoides (Less.) Moq.; Oligandra atriplicoides Less.

= Lipandra =

Genus of flowering plants

Lipandra polysperma (Syn. Chenopodium polyspermum), common name manyseed goosefoot, is the only species of the monotypic plant genus Lipandra from the subfamily Chenopodioideae of the family Amaranthaceae.

== Description ==
Many-seeded goosefoot is a non-aromatic, glabrous annual herb, which can grow up to 1 m tall, although often has a sprawling habit. The stem is square in cross-section and can be green or bright red. The leaves (and subsequently branches) are alternate but sometimes nearly opposite at the base. it has no stipules. The petioles are up to 2.5 cm long, and the leaves are ovate-elliptic, 3-5 cm long, and usually have untoothed margins.

The inflorescences consist of loose dichasia in the axils of leaf-like bracts, sometimes of more condensed glomerules of flowers arranged spicately. The flowers are bisexual or pistillate, with (4-) 5 nearly free perianth segments, 1-3 (-5) stamens and an ovary with 2 stigmas.

In fruit, perianth segments remain unchanged. The fruit has a membranous pericarp, which is free from the seed. The horizontally orientated seeds are compressed-globose. The brown to blackish seed coat is undulately striate.

== Distribution ==
Lipandra polysperma is distributed in most regions of Europe and in temperate Asia. It is widely naturalized elsewhere, as in North America.

== Systematics ==
The species was first described in 1753 by Carl Linnaeus as Chenopodium polyspermum in Species Plantarum. After phylogenetic research, Fuentes-Bazan et al. (2012) separated this species from genus Chenopodium that would otherwise have been polyphyletic. The genus Lipandra was first described by Alfred Moquin-Tandon in 1840 (in Chenopodearum monographica enumeratio, p. 19.), replacing an older illegitimate name: Christian Friedrich Lessing's genus Oligandra (1835, not the Asteraceae genus Oligandra from 1832) had only one species, Oligandra atriplicoides, that was soon considered identical with Chenopodium polyspermum.

Lipandra polysperma belongs to the same tribe as Chenopodium, Tribus Atripliceae.

Synonyms of genus Lipandra Moq.:

- Oligandra Less. 1835 (nom illeg., non Less. 1832)
- Gandriloa Steud. (nom. illeg.)
- Oliganthera Endl. (nom. illeg.)
- Chenopodium [unranked] Polysperma Standl.
- Chenopodium subsect. Polysperma (Standl.) Kowal ex Mosyakin & Clemants
