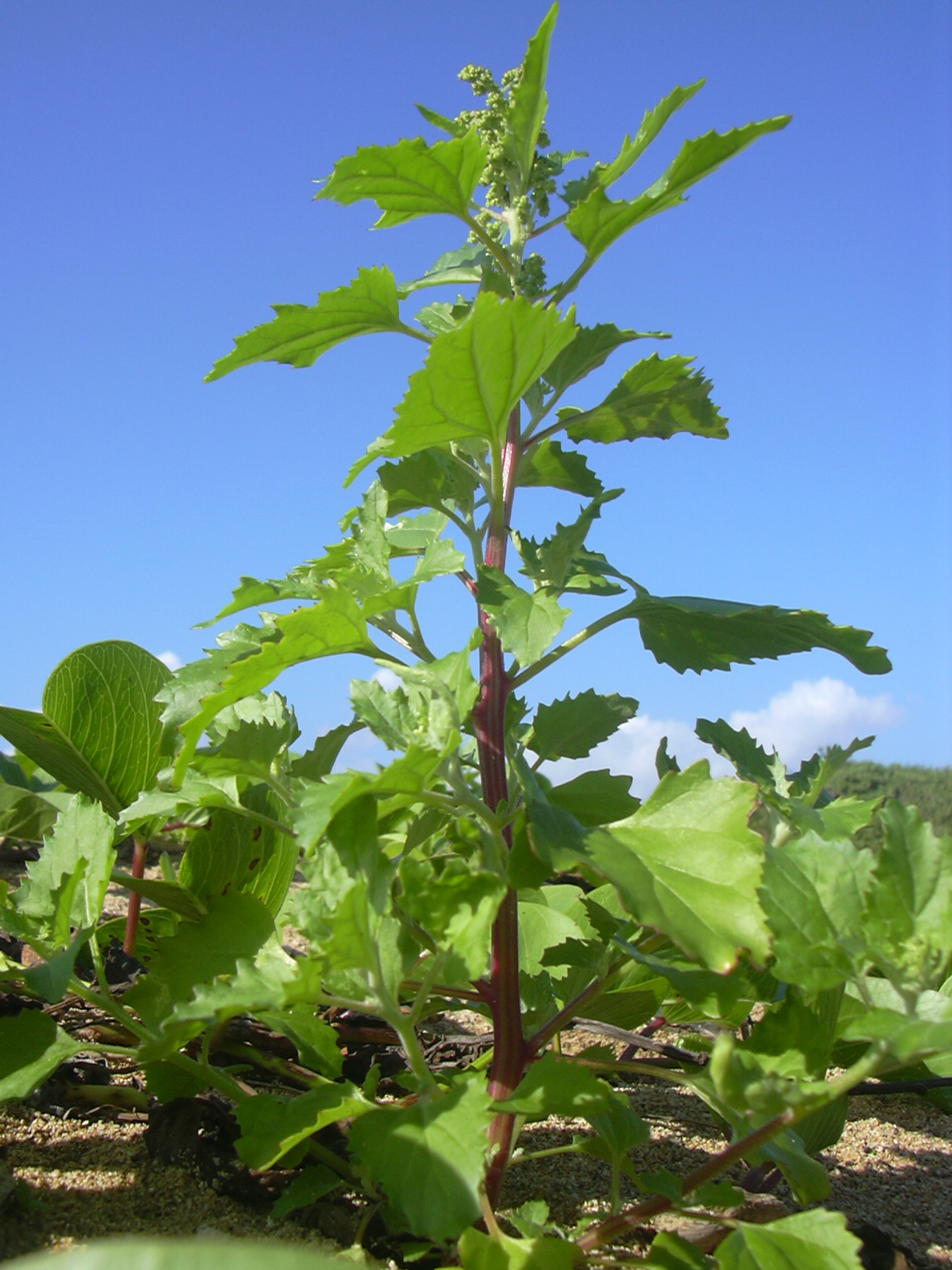
- Chenopodiastrum murale

Scientific classification
- Kingdom: Plantae
- Clade: Tracheophytes
- Clade: Angiosperms
- Clade: Eudicots
- Order: Caryophyllales
- Family: Amaranthaceae
- Subfamily: Chenopodioideae
- Tribe: Atripliceae
- Genus: Chenopodiastrum (L.) S.Fuentes, Uotila & Borsch

Synonyms
- Chenopodium subsect. Undata Aellen & Iljin ex Mosyakin & Clemants; Chenopodium [unranked] Hybrida Standl.; Chenopodium sect. Grossefoveata Aellen & Iljin ex Mosyakin

= Chenopodiastrum =

Genus of flowering plants

Chenopodiastrum is a genus of herbaceous flowering plants in the family Amaranthaceae. The genus was formally described in 2012. The five species occur in both the Old World and North America.

== Description ==
The species in genus Chenopodiastrum are non-aromatic annual herbs. Young plants have vesicular trichomes, that later collapse and fall down, thus plants becoming glabrescent. Stems grow erect, with lateral branches. The alternate leaves have a petiole and a thickish triangular, ovate, rhombic-ovate to lanceolate leaf blade. The leaf margin can be irregularly dentate or lobed, or pinnatifid with narrow dentate lobes.

The axillary and terminal inflorescences consist of small dense glomerules of flowers, arranged spicately or paniculately. Flowers are bisexual or pistillate. They contain 5 basally connate perianth segments with a prominent keel near the apex, and a characteristic strong midrib visible from the inside; a circle of 5 stamens; and an ovary with 2 stigmas.

In fruit, the perianth lobes enclose the fruit or spread. The membraneous pericarp adheres firmly to the seed. The horizontally orientated seeds are lenticular. The black seed coat is often prominently pitted, sometimes rugulose or nearly smooth.

== Taxonomy ==
The genus Chenopodiastrum was described in 2012 by Suzy Fuentes-Bazan, Pertti Uotila und Thomas Borsch (in: A novel phylogeny-based generic classification for Chenopodium sensu lato, and a tribal rearrangement of Chenopodioideae (Chenopodiaceae). in Willdenowia 42, p. 14). After phylogenetic research, this group of species had to be separated from genus Chenopodium, that would otherwise have been polyphyletic. The genus Chenopodiastrum belongs to the same tribe as Chenopodium, Tribus Atripliceae.

Chenopodiastrum consists of 5 species, occurring in Eurasia, North Africa, and North America.

== Distribution ==
The species are distributed as follows:

- Chenopodiastrum badachschanicum (Tzvelev) S.Fuentes, Uotila & Borsch, (syn. Chenopodium badachschanicum Tzvelev): In Middle Asia, China, northeastern Afghanistan, northern Pakistan, northern India and Nepal.
- Chenopodiastrum coronopus (Moq.) S.Fuentes, Uotila & Borsch, (syn. Chenopodium coronopus Moq.): endemic on Canary Islands, Ilhas Selvagens, and probably Madeira.
- Chenopodiastrum hybridum (L.) S.Fuentes, Uotila & Borsch (syn. Chenopodium hybridum L.): in Europe, India and from temperate Asia to China.
- Chenopodiastrum murale (L) S.Fuentes, Uotila & Borsch (syn. Chenopodium murale L. ): in Europe, North Africa and Southwest Asia.
- Chenopodiastrum simplex (Torr.) S.Fuentes, Uotila & Borsch (syn. Chenopodium hybridum var. simplex Torr.): in North America.
