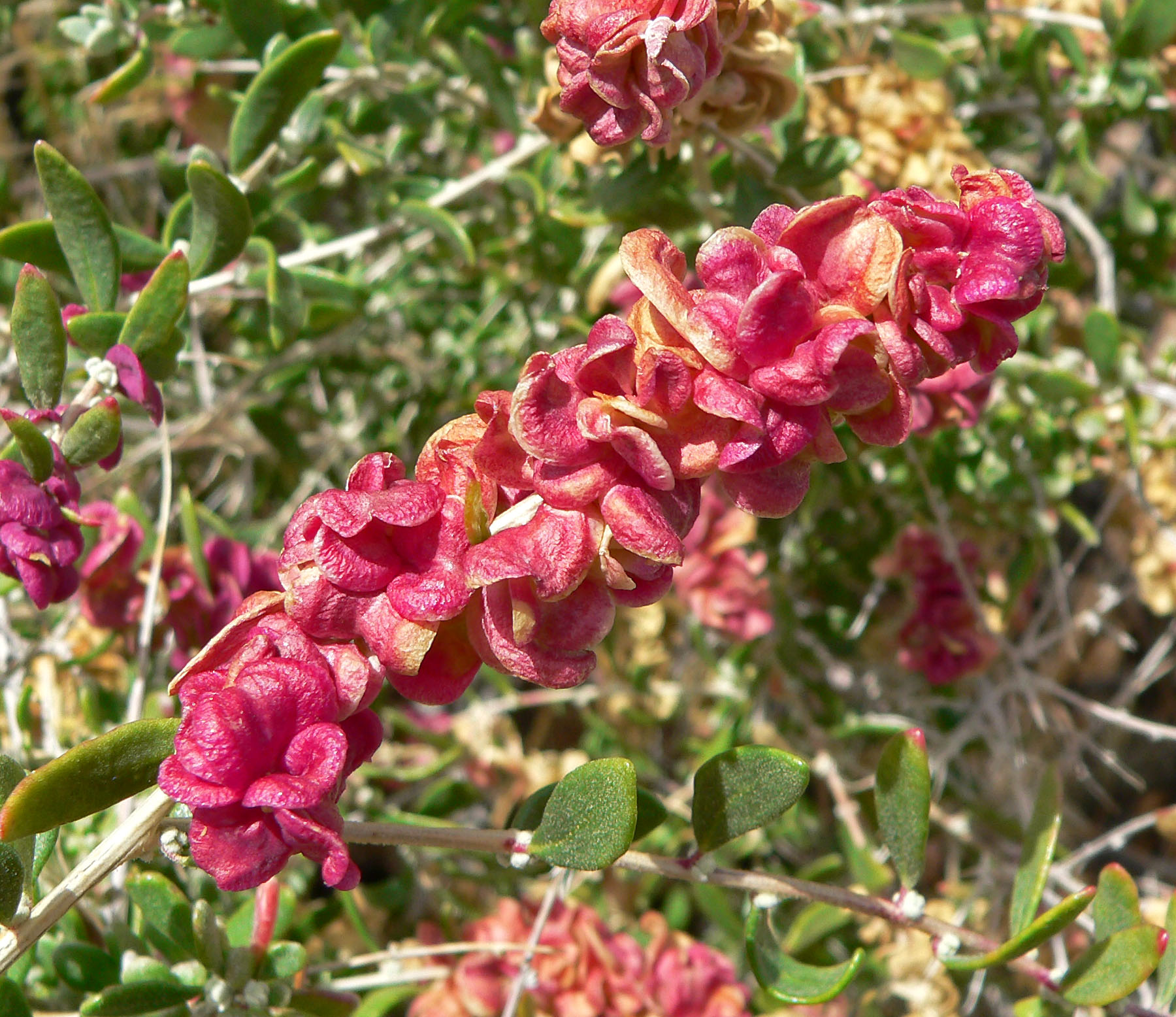
- Grayia spinosa

Scientific classification
- Kingdom: Plantae
- Clade: Tracheophytes
- Clade: Angiosperms
- Clade: Eudicots
- Order: Caryophyllales
- Family: Amaranthaceae
- Subfamily: Chenopodioideae
- Tribe: Atripliceae
- Genus: Grayia; Hook. & Arn.

Synonyms
- Zuckia Standl.

= Grayia (plant) =

Genus of flowering plants

Grayia is a genus of plants in the subfamily Chenopodioideae of the family Amaranthaceae. Common names are siltbush and hopsage. The four shrubby species occur in arid and semiarid regions of western North America:

== Description ==
The species of Grayia are shrubs or subshrubs reaching 15–150 cm. The stems grow erect or ascending and are much branched and woody. Young stems are densely hairy, later glabrescent, lateral branches sometimes becoming spiny. Young branches are ribbed or striate. The old bark is gray brown. There are prominent subglobose buds in the leaf axils. The alternate leaves of 6–80 × 1.5–42 mm are succulent or coriaceous. They are nearly sessile or basally tapering to short petioles. The green to grayish leaf blades can be elliptic, ovate, obovate, spatulate, or linear-oblanceolate, with entire margins and prominent midveins. Especially at the tips, the leaves are hairy with simple or branched hairs. The leaves have a "normal" (non-Kranz) anatomy.

The plants are dioecious or monoecious. The inflorescences consist of glomeruled male flowers arranged in interrupted axillary or terminal spikes or panicles, and of female flowers in terminal and axillary interrupted panicles. Male flowers are without bracteoles, comprising 4-5 membranous perianth lobes 1–1.8 mm long, connate to the middle, with hooded tips, and 4-5 stamens opposite to perianth lobes, inserted on a disc, with non-exserting anthers. The female flowers are sitting within 2 opposite bracteoles, a perianth is lacking, they consist just of an ovary with 2 filiform, exserted stigmas.

In fruit, the bracteoles enclosing the fruit become accrescent, folded along the midribs and connate nearly to the apex, 4–14 × 3–15 mm. Their shape can be orbicular, broadly elliptic, or cordate, their margins are usually entire, but sometimes wavy or extended into two wings, their surface is flat or ribbed, glabrous or hairy. Initially, bracteoles are yellowish-greenish or cream-colored, later they become reddish or pinkish. The orbicular, obovoid or laterally compressed-lenticular fruit (utricle) does not fall at maturity. The membranous pericarp is free or slightly adheres to the seed. The vertically or horizontally orientated seed has a brown to yellowish-brown, thin membranous seed coat. The annular embryo surrounds the copious farinaceous perisperm.

The flowering time is March to June.

The chromosome numbers are 2n = 18 (for the diploid Grayia arizonica and Grayia brandegeei) and 2n = 36 (for the tetraploid Grayia spinosa and Grayia plummeri).

== Distribution ==
The genus Grayia is native in the western United States (Arizona, California, Colorado, Idaho, Montana, New Mexico, Nevada, Oregon, Utah, Washington, and Wyoming). Some species are of limited range. The genus grows in arid or semiarid regions on heavy clay, sandy loams, on alkaline or scarcely alkaline soils. Although overlapping in ranges, the species differ in the preferred soils.

== Systematics ==
The genus Grayia has been first described by William Jackson Hooker and George Arnott Walker-Arnott in 1840 in: The Botany of Captain Beechey's Voyage (p. 387–388). It included just one species, Grayia polygaloides Hook. & Arn. (nom. illeg.) = Chenopodium spinosum Hook. = Grayia spinosa (Hook.) Moq. The genus name was given in honour to the American botanist Asa Gray.

Grayia belongs to the tribe Atripliceae of the subfamily Chenopodioideae in the Amaranthaceae. Until 2010, the genus was treated as monotypic. After phylogenetic research, Zacharias & Baldwin (2010) included here the genus Zuckia. Now Grayia comprises 4 species:

- Grayia arizonica (Standl.) E.H.Zacharias, (Syn. Zuckia arizonica Standl., Zuckia brandegeei var. arizonica (Standl.) S. L. Welsh) - Arizona siltbush: in Arizona and Utah
- Grayia brandegeei A. Gray (Syn. Zuckia brandegeei (A. Gray) S. L. Welsh & Stutz) - Brandegee's siltbush: in Colorado, Arizona, Utah
- Grayia plummeri (Stutz & S.C.Sand.) E.H.Zacharias, (Syn. Grayia brandegeei var. plummeri Stutz & S. C. Sand., Zuckia brandegeei var. plummeri (Stutz & S. C. Sand.) Dorn) - Plummer's siltbush: in Colorado, Wyoming, New Mexico and Utah
- Grayia spinosa (Hook.) Moq., spiny hopsage: in Colorado, Idaho, Montana, Oregon, Washington, Wyoming, Arizona, California, Nevada and Utah.
