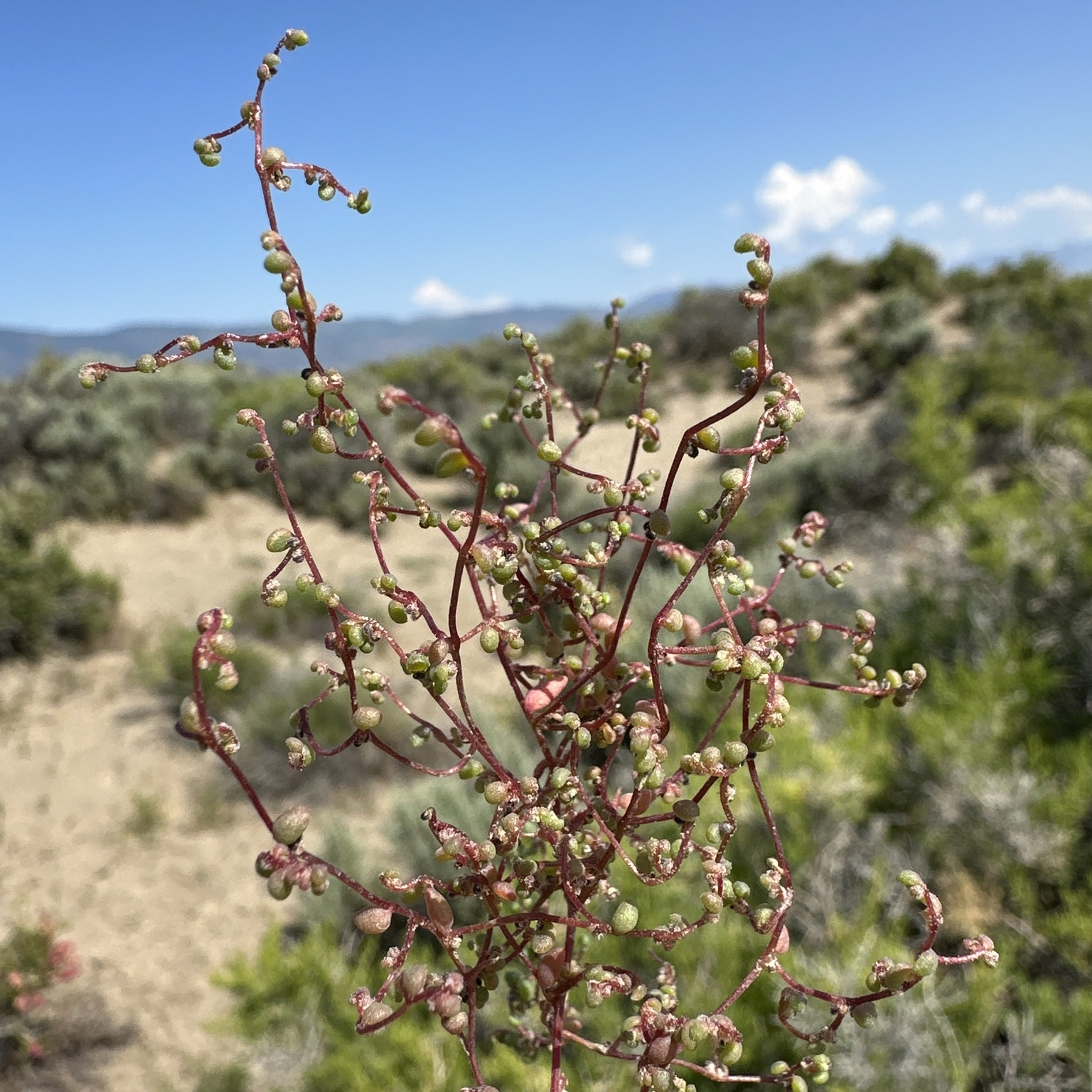

Conservation status
- Secure (NatureServe)

Scientific classification
- Kingdom: Plantae
- Clade: Tracheophytes
- Clade: Angiosperms
- Clade: Eudicots
- Order: Caryophyllales
- Family: Amaranthaceae
- Subfamily: Chenopodioideae
- Tribe: Atripliceae
- Genus: Micromonolepis; Ulbr.
- Species: M. pusilla

Binomial name
- Micromonolepis pusilla (Torr. ex S.Watson) Ulbr.

Synonyms
- Monolepis pusilla Torr. ex S. Watson

= Micromonolepis =

Genus of flowering plants

Micromonolepis pusilla, (Syn. Monolepis pusilla) is the only species of the genus Micromonolepis in the flowering plant family Amaranthaceae, known by the common names small povertyweed and red povertyweed. It is native to the Western United States, including the Great Basin and surrounding areas, where it grows in sandy scrub, dry valleys, playas, and other open habitat. It is a somewhat fleshy annual herb producing a branching, slender stem that has a mealy whitish texture when young and turns dull to bright red with age, losing its grainy coat. It grows up to 14 to 20 centimeters tall. The thick oblong leaves are up to a centimeter long. Clusters of 1 to 3 minute flowers appear in the leaf axils, each flower made up of 3 tiny sepals.

NatureServe assessed Micromonolepis pusilla as globally secure (G5) in 2007. At the state level they did not assess populations in Nevada or Oregon, tentatively evaluated California populations as "vulnerable" (S3), and evaluated Wyoming populations as "imperiled" (S2). The plant populations in Utah and Washington state were evaluated as "critically imperiled" (S1) and the Colorado population as "possibly extirpated" (SH).

Micromonolepis
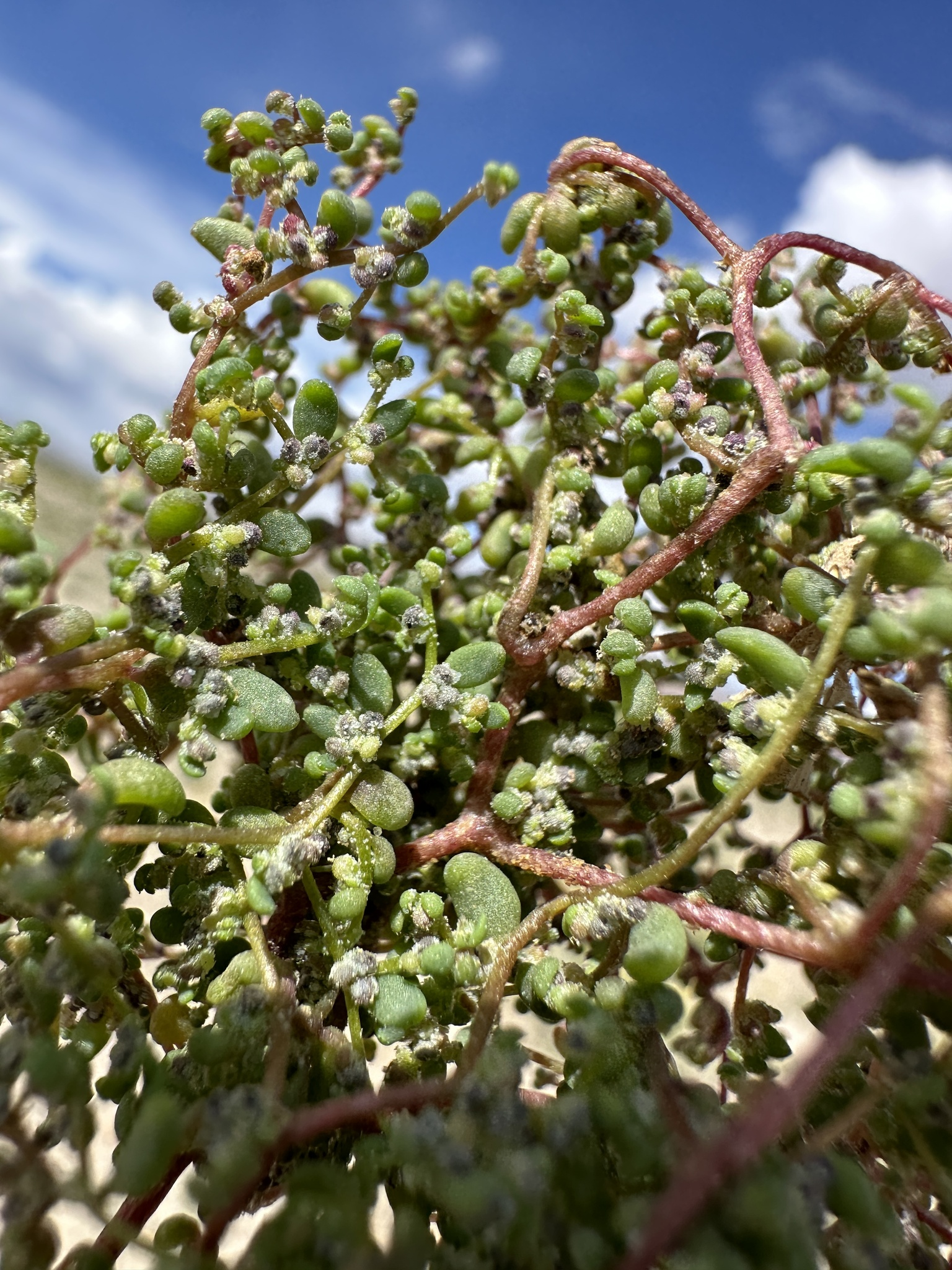
Micromonolepis pusilla detail of leaves

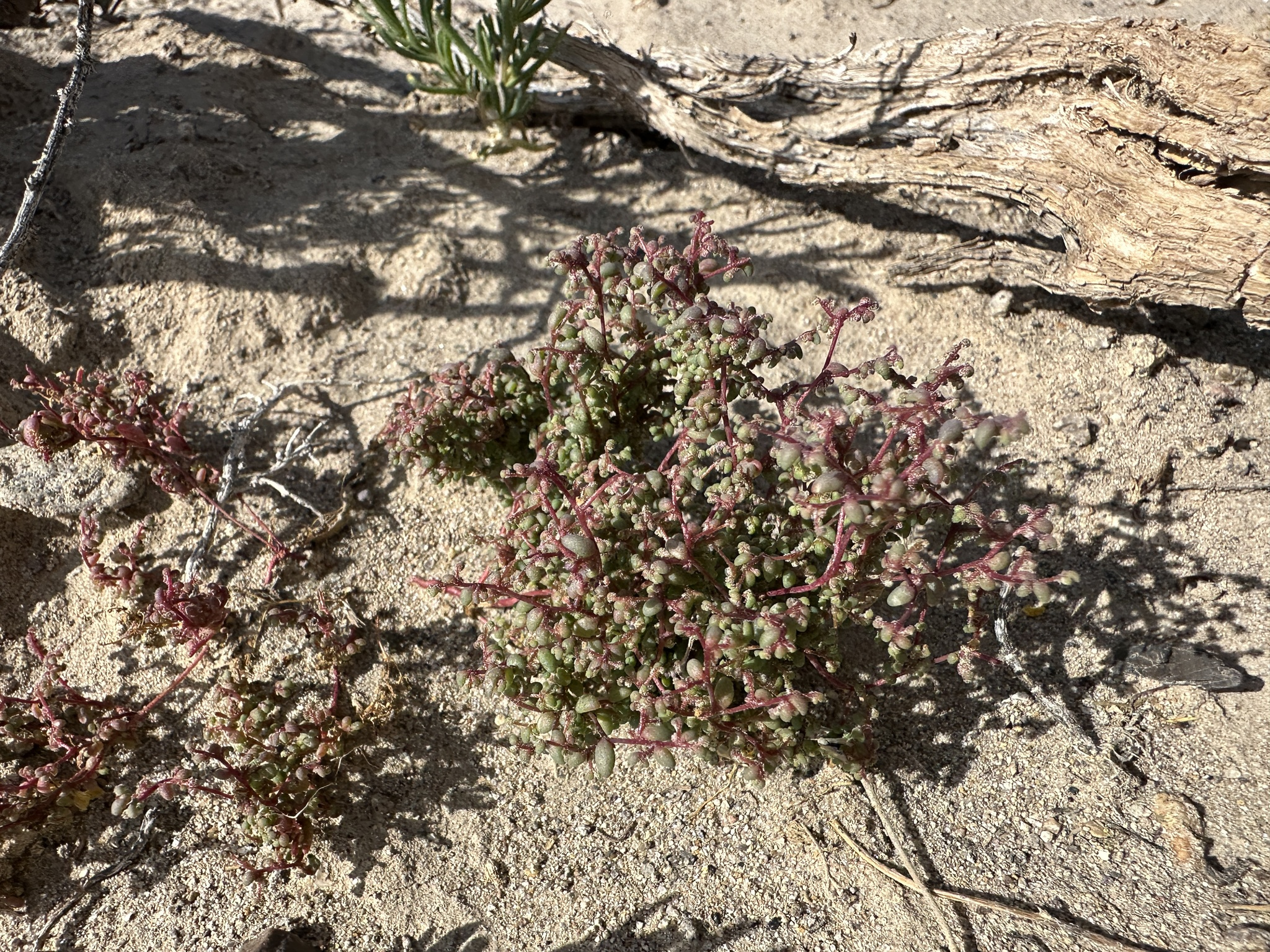
Micromonolepis pusilla plant in sandy area Tonopah Basin, Nye County, Nevada

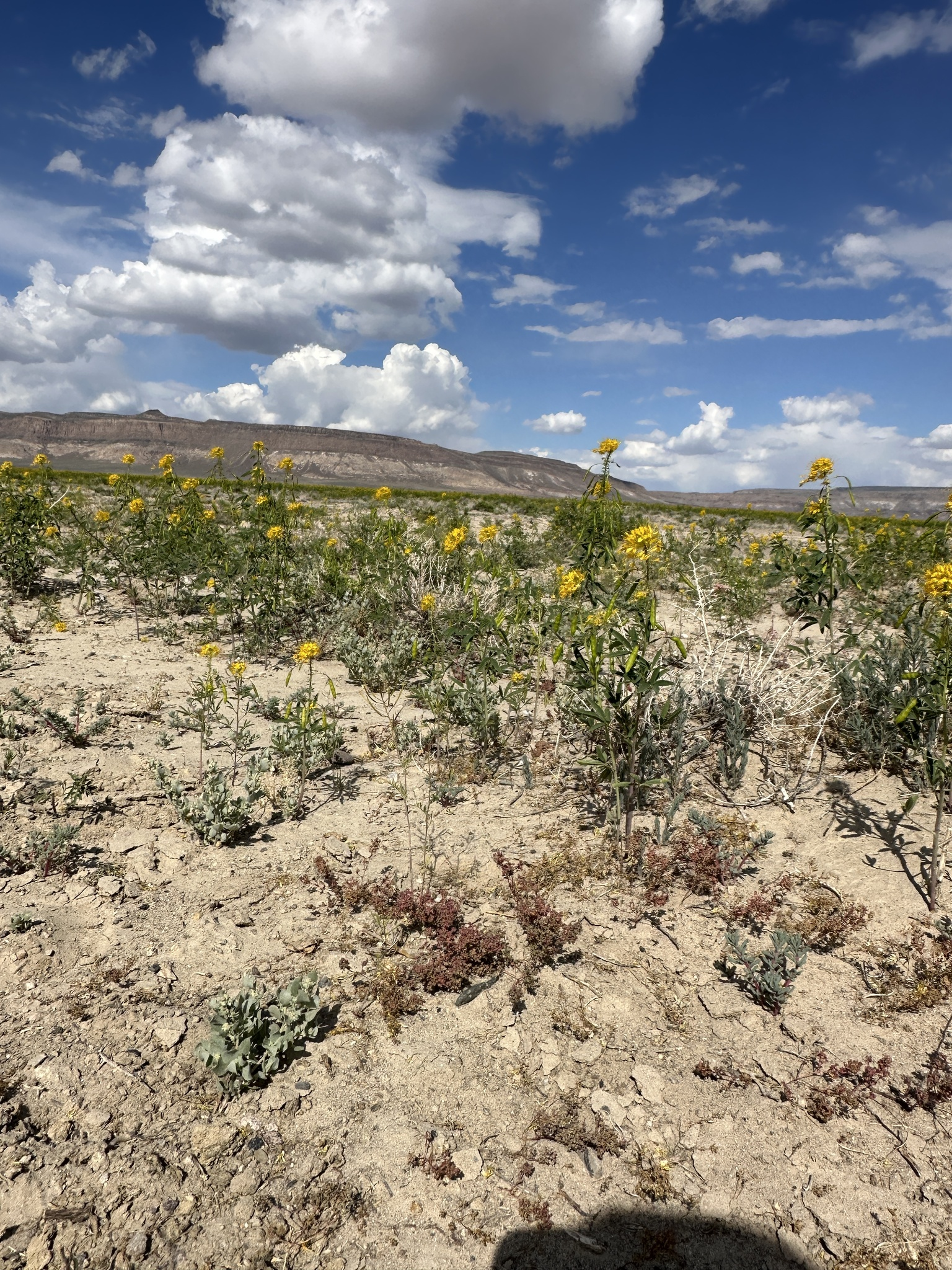
Micromonolepis pusilla in wide shot showing habitat with Cleomella lutea
