= Aellen =

Aellen is a surname. Notable people with the surname include:

- Richard Aellen, American novelist and playwright
- Paul Aellen (1896–1973), Swiss botanist
