= Howard Stutz =

American geneticist

Howard Coombs Stutz (1918–2010) was a geneticist and professor at Brigham Young University.

Stutz was born and raised in Cardston, Alberta, Canada. He did his undergraduate studies at and then received a Ph.D. from the University of California, Berkeley.

He was a professor at BYU for over 40 years. His primary areas of research were on the history of the cultivation of crops, such as rye, and on desert shrubs. He is most well known for his research on Atriplex.

He was the recipient of a Guggenheim Fellowship in 1960.

Stutz was a Latter-day Saint, holding multiple position in the church over the years including as a bishop and later a stake patriarch.

He also wrote a book entitled "Let the Earth Bring Forth", Evolution and Scripture.

The genus Stutzia was named for him.

== Sources ==
- Obituary for Stutz
- Review of Stutz book in Interpreter
- Review of Let The Earth Bring Forth
