= Stutzia covillei =

Scientific classification
- Kingdom: Plantae
- Clade: Tracheophytes
- Clade: Angiosperms
- Clade: Eudicots
- Order: Caryophyllales
- Family: Amaranthaceae
- Genus: Stutzia
- Species: S. covillei

Binomial name
- Stutzia covillei (Standl.) E.H. Zacharias

Synonyms
- Endolepis covillei Standl.; Atriplex covillei (Standl.) J.F.Macbr.

Species of plant

Stutzia covillei, the arrow-scale or Coville's orach, is an annual plant in the amaranth family (Amaranthaceae) that grows in dry climates and deserts of the Southwestern United States. Formerly part of genus Atriplex and transferred to Stutzia in 2010.
