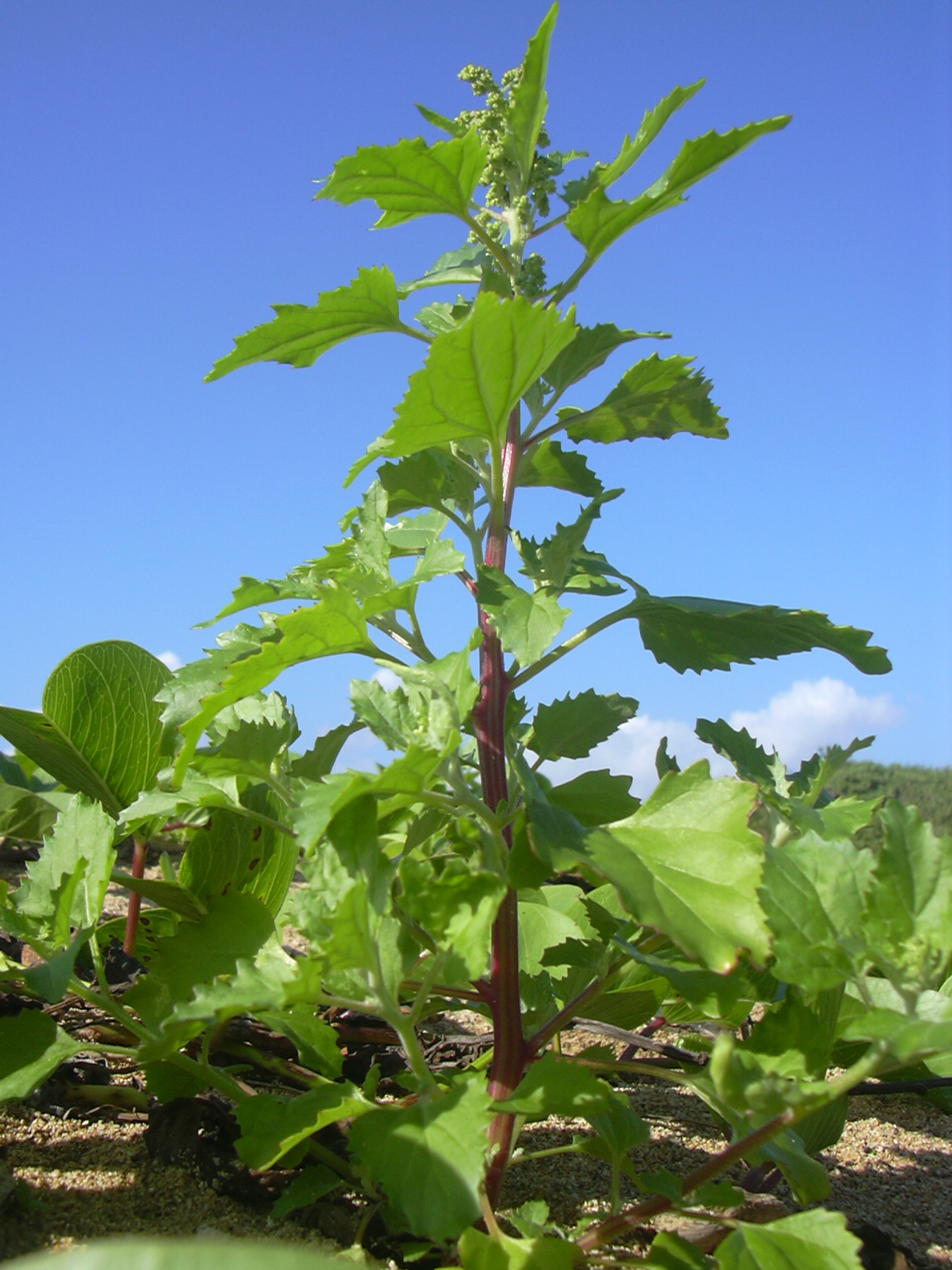

Scientific classification
- Kingdom: Plantae
- Clade: Tracheophytes
- Clade: Angiosperms
- Clade: Eudicots
- Order: Caryophyllales
- Family: Amaranthaceae
- Genus: Chenopodiastrum
- Species: C. murale

Binomial name
- Chenopodiastrum murale (L.) S. Fuentes, Uotila & Borsch

Synonyms
- Chenopodium murale L.

= Chenopodiastrum murale =

Nettle-leaved goosefoot

Species of flowering plant

Chenopodiastrum murale (Syn. Chenopodium murale) is a species of plant in the family Amaranthaceae known by the common names nettle-leaved goosefoot, Australian-spinach, salt-green, and sowbane. This plant is native to Europe and parts of Asia and northern Africa, but it is widespread worldwide, particularly in tropical and subtropical areas due to the ease of it being introduced. It is a common weed of fields and roadsides.

== Description ==
This is an annual herb reaching 70 centimeters in height. It has an erect stem which is usually red or red-streaked green and leafy with green foliage. The oval to triangular leaves are toothed and broad, smooth on the upper surface and powdery on the undersides.

The inflorescences are powdery clusters of spherical buds. The buds do not open into typical flower blossoms, but remain with the sepals covering the ovary as the fruit develops.

== Uses ==
The seeds are edible, and the shoots, stalks, and leaves can be eaten as greens. The 1889 book The Useful Native Plants of Australia records that common names include "Australian spinach" and "fat-hen". It also states that it is a "pot-herb", which may be utilised in the same manner as spinach.

Care should be taken not to confuse this species with black nightshades, many of which look similar when young. The leaves of Chenopodium murale have a white mealy texture, and the axils have a red streak.
