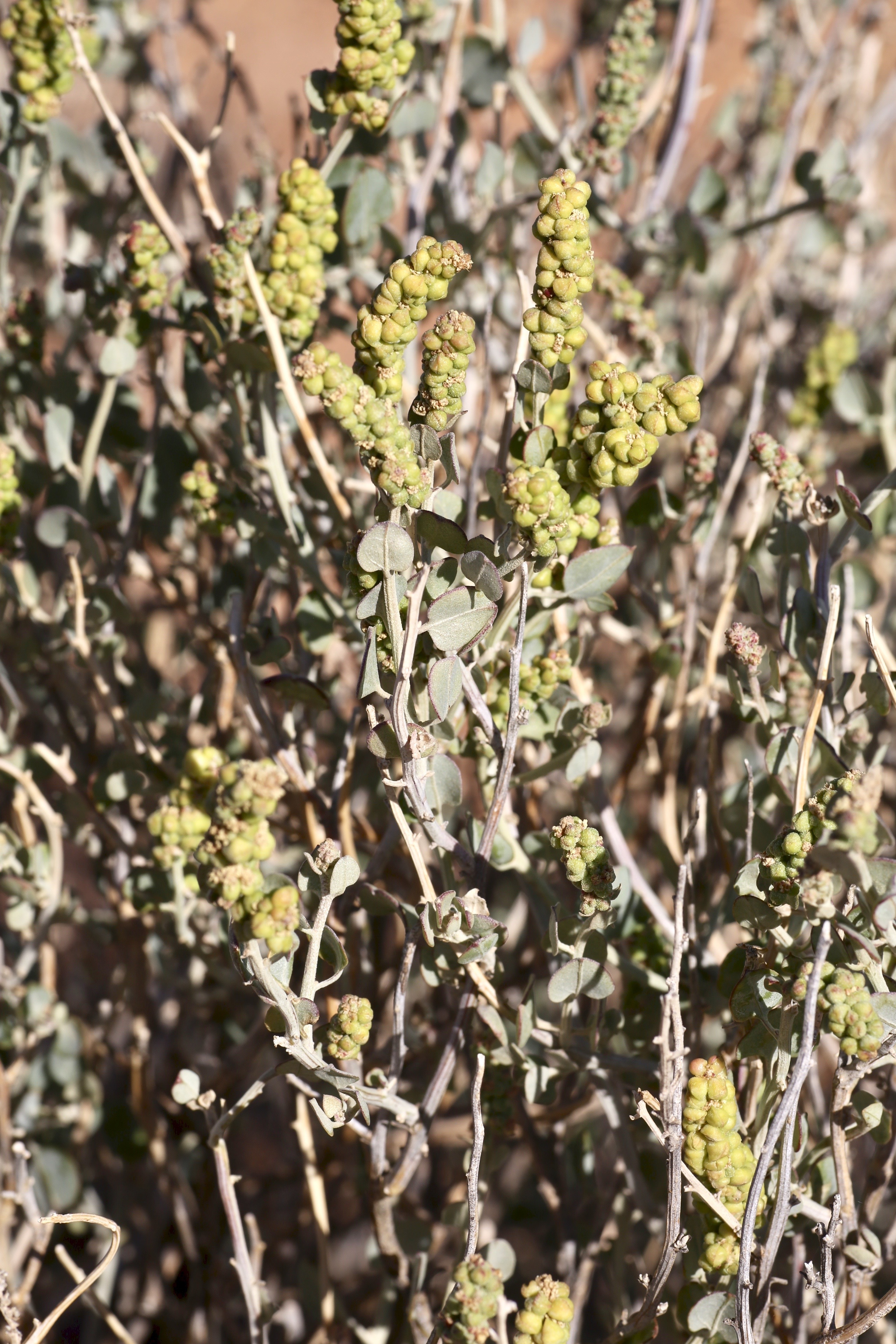

Scientific classification
- Kingdom: Plantae
- Clade: Tracheophytes
- Clade: Angiosperms
- Clade: Eudicots
- Order: Caryophyllales
- Family: Amaranthaceae
- Genus: Manochlamys; Aellen (1939)
- Species: M. albicans

Binomial name
- Manochlamys albicans (Aiton) Aellen (1939)

Synonyms
- Atriplex alba Salisb. (1796); Atriplex albicans Aiton (1789) (basionym); Atriplex odorata Pers. (1805); Exomis albicans (Aiton) Moq. (1849); Exomis atriplicioides Moq. (1840)

= Manochlamys =

Genus of plants

Manochlamys albicans is a species of flowering plant belonging to the family Amaranthaceae. It is the sole species in genus Manochlamys. It is a subshrub or shrub native to Namibia and the Cape Provinces of South Africa.
