= Holmbergia =

Scientific classification
- Kingdom: Plantae
- Clade: Tracheophytes
- Clade: Angiosperms
- Clade: Eudicots
- Order: Caryophyllales
- Family: Amaranthaceae
- Genus: Holmbergia; Hicken (1909)
- Species: H. tweediei

Binomial name
- Holmbergia tweediei (Moq.) Speg. (1916)

Synonyms
- Chenopodium exocarpum Griseb. (1879); Chenopodium stuckertii Gand. (1908); Chenopodium tweediei Moq. (1849); Holmbergia exocarpa (Griseb.) Hicken (1909)

Genus of flowering plants

Holmbergia is a monotypic genus of flowering plants belonging to the family Amaranthaceae. It only contains one species, Holmbergia tweediei (Moq.) Speg.

Its native range is in southern South America. It is found in Bolivia, Paraguay, Uruguay and Argentina.

The genus name of Holmbergia is in honour of Eduardo Ladislao Holmberg (1775–1862), an Argentine natural historian and novelist, as well as a leading figure in Argentine biology. The Latin specific epithet of tweediei refers to botanist John (James) Tweedie (1900-1989).

The genus of Holmbergia was first described and published in Apuntes Hist. Nat. Vol.1 on page 65 in 1909. and the species, Holmbergia tweediei was first described and published in Physis (Buenos Aires) Vol.2 on page 178 in 1916.
