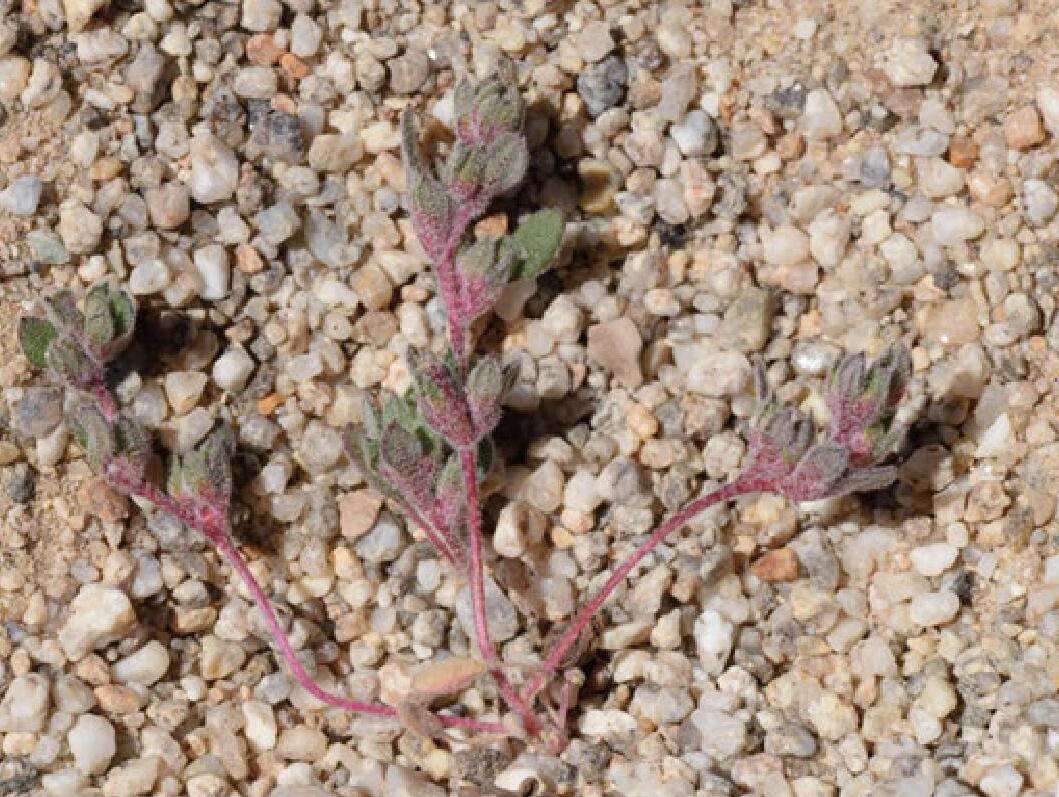

Scientific classification
- Kingdom: Plantae
- Clade: Embryophytes
- Clade: Tracheophytes
- Clade: Spermatophytes
- Clade: Angiosperms
- Clade: Eudicots
- Order: Caryophyllales
- Family: Amaranthaceae
- Genus: Microgynoecium; Hook.f. (1880)
- Species: M. tibeticum

Binomial name
- Microgynoecium tibeticum Hook.f. (1886)

= Microgynoecium =

Genus of plants

Microgynoecium tibeticum is a species of flowering plant belonging to the family Amaranthaceae. It is the sole species in genus Microgynoecium. It is an annual native to Central Asia, the Himalayas, Tibetan Plateau, and northwestern China.
