= Archiatriplex =

Scientific classification
- Kingdom: Plantae
- Clade: Tracheophytes
- Clade: Angiosperms
- Clade: Eudicots
- Order: Caryophyllales
- Family: Amaranthaceae
- Genus: Archiatriplex; G.L.Chu (1987)
- Species: A. nanpinensis

Binomial name
- Archiatriplex nanpinensis G.L.Chu (1987)

Genus of flowering plants

Archiatriplex nanpinensis is a species of flowering plant belonging to the family Amaranthaceae. It is an annual endemic to northern Sichuan province of south-central China. It is the sole species in genus Archiatriplex.
