= Ge Lin Chu =

Chinese botanist (born 1934)

Ge Lin Chu (born 1934) is a Chinese botanist.

Alternative names: Ge Ling Chu, Ge Lin(g) Zhu, Gelin Zhu

The standard author abbreviation G.L.Chu is used to indicate this person as the author when citing a botanical name.

== Taxon names authored ==
(List may be incomplete)
352 taxon names authored by Ge Lin Chu.

== Publications ==
(List incomplete)

- Kung, H.W., Chu, G.L., Tsien, C.P., Li, A.J., & Ma, C.G. 1978. The Chenopodiaceae in China. Acta Phytotaxonomica Sinica 16(1): 99–123.
- Kung, H.W., Chu, G.L., Tsien, C.P., Ma, C.G., & Li, A.J. 1979. Chenopodiaceae. In: Kung H.W. & Tsien, C.P. (eds.): Flora Reipublicae Popularis Sinicae 25(2): 1–194.
- Chu, G.L. 1987. Archiatriplex, a new chenopodiaceous genus from China. Journal of the Arnold Arboretum 68(4): 461–469.
- Stutz, H.C. & Sanderson, S.C., McArthur, E.D. & Chu, G.-L. 1987. Chromosome races of Grayia brandegei (Chenopodiaceae). Madroño 34(2): 142–149.
- Stutz, Howard C.; Chu, Ge-Lin; Sanderson, Stewart C. (1990). "Evolutionary Studies of Atriplex: Phylogenetic relationships of Atriplex pleiantha". American Journal of Botany. 77 (3): 364–369. doi:10.1002/j.1537-2197.1990.tb13565.x. ISSN 0002-9122.
- Stutz, H.C. & Chu, G.L. 1993. Atriplex minuticarpa (Chenopodiaceae), a new species from eastern Utah. Madroño 40(3): 161–165, f. 1.

Stutz, H.C. & Chu, G.L. 1993. Atriplex persistens (Chenopodiaceae), a new species from California. Madroño 40(4): 209–213.

- Stutz, H.C., Chu, G.L. & Sanderson, S.C. 1994. Atriplex asterocarpa (Chenopodiaceae), a new species from southern Utah and northern Arizona. Madroño 41(3): 199–204.
- Stutz, H.C., Chu, G.L. & Sanderson, S.C. 1997. Atriplex erecticaulis (Chenopodiaceae): A new species from South-Central California. Madroño 44(1): 89–94, f. 1, 2 (right).
- Stutz, H.C. & Chu, G.L. 1997. Atriplex subtilis (Chenopodiaceae): a new species from south-central California. Madroño 44(2): 184–188, figs. 1, 2a, 3.
- Stutz, H.C. & Chu, G.L. 1997. Atriplex pachypoda (Chenopodiaceae), a new species from southwestern Colorado and northwestern New Mexico. Madroño 44(3): 277–281, f. 1, 2 (right).
- Stutz, H.C., Chu, G.L. & Sanderson, S.C. 1998. Atriplex longitrichoma (Chenopodiaceae), a new species from southwestern Nevada and east-central California. Madroño 45(2): 128–130.
- Chu, G.L. 2000. Chenopodiaceae. Higher Plants of China 4: 304–367.
- Zhu, G., Mosyakin, S.L. & Clemants, S.E. 2004. Chenopodiaceae. In: Flora of China 5. eFloras 2008.
- Chu, G.L. & Sanderson, S.C. 2008. The genus Kochia (Chenopodiaceae) in North America. Madroño 55(4): 251–256.
- Wen, Z-B; Zhang, M-L; Zhu, G-L; Sanderson, S.C. (2010). "Phylogeny of Salsoleae s.l. (Chenopodiaceae) based on DNA sequence data from ITS, psbB–psbH, and rbcL, with emphasis on taxa of northwestern China". Plant Systematics and Evolution. 288 (1–2): 25–42. doi:10.1007/s00606-010-0310-5. ISSN 0378-2697. S2CID 3912243.
- Zhang, M.; Zhu, G. (2016). "Resurrection of the genus Botrydium Spach (Chenopodiaceae), with a description of four new species from China, Peru and Burundi". Plant Diversity. 38 (6): 322–329. doi:10.1016/j.pld.2016.10.005. ISSN 2468-2659. PMC 6112192. PMID 30159484.
- Zhu, G.L. & Sanderson, S.C. 2017. Genera and a New Evolutionary System of World Chenopodiaceae. 361 pp. Beijing: Science Press.
