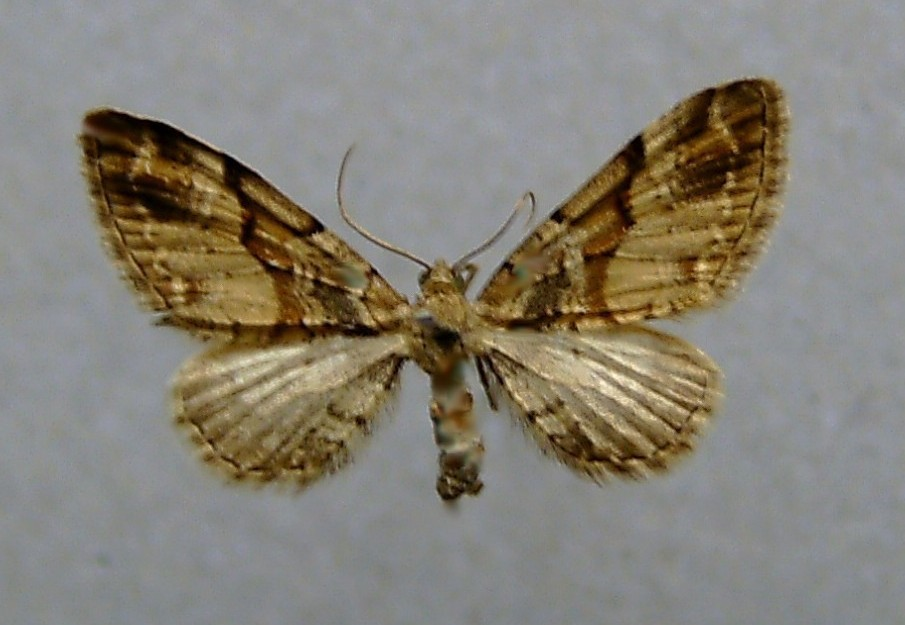

Scientific classification
- Domain: Eukaryota
- Kingdom: Animalia
- Phylum: Arthropoda
- Class: Insecta
- Order: Lepidoptera
- Family: Geometridae
- Genus: Eupithecia
- Species: E. sinuosaria

Binomial name
- Eupithecia sinuosaria (Eversmann, 1848)

Synonyms
- Larentia sinuosaria Eversmann, 1848

= Eupithecia sinuosaria =

Species of moth

Eupithecia sinuosaria, the goosefoot pug, is a moth of the family Geometridae. It is endemic to Eastern Asia, but has expanded its range to Central Europe.

The length of the fore-wings is 10–12 mm. The moth flies from June to August depending on the location.

The larvae feed on Chenopodium album, Chenopodium pratericola, Chenopodium hybridum, Chenopodium glaucum, Atriplex patula and Polygonum aviculare.

== Subspecies ==
- Eupithecia sinuosaria sinuosaria
- Eupithecia sinuosaria obliquaria Leech, 1897
- Eupithecia sinuosaria tenella Vojnits, 1976
