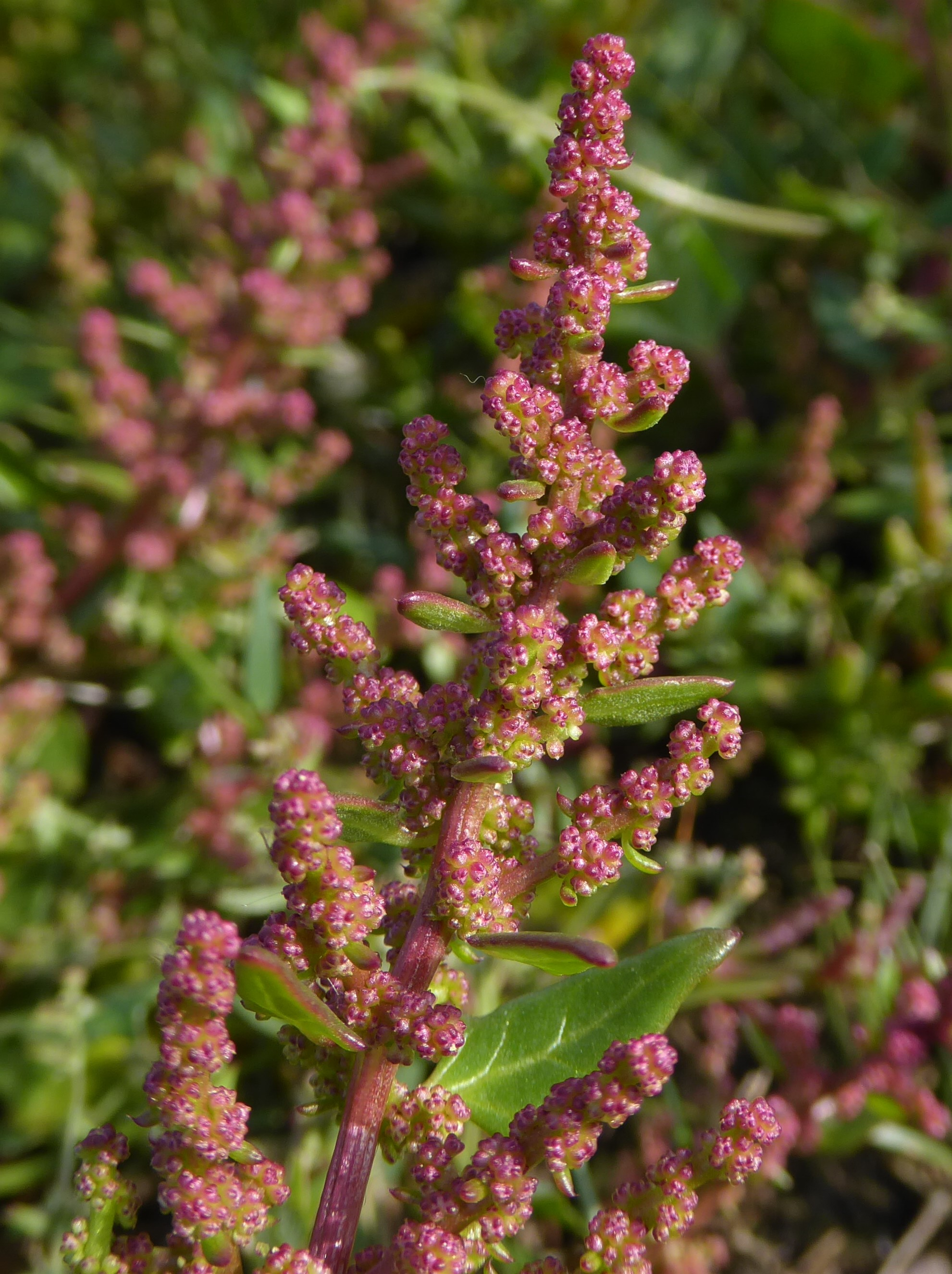

Conservation status
- Least Concern (IUCN 3.1)

Scientific classification
- Kingdom: Plantae
- Clade: Tracheophytes
- Clade: Angiosperms
- Clade: Eudicots
- Order: Caryophyllales
- Family: Amaranthaceae
- Genus: Oxybasis
- Species: O. chenopodioides

Binomial name
- Oxybasis chenopodioides (L.) S.Fuentes, Uotila & Borsch

Synonyms
- List: Agathophytum crassifolium Fuss (1866); Agathophytum humifusum Kitt. (1843); Blitum botryoides (Sm.) Drejer (1877); Blitum chenopodioides L. (1771); Blitum crassifolium (Hornem.) Rchb. (1832); Blitum polymorphum var. crassifolium (Hornem.) Moq. (1840); Blitum rubrum var. crassifolium Moq. (1849); Blitum virgatum var. chenopodioides (L.) Vahl (1804); Chenopodium album var. concatenatum (Thuill.) Mérat (1812); Chenopodium album subsp. concatenatum (Thuill.) Schübl. & G.Martens (1834); Chenopodium botryoides Sm. (1811); Chenopodium chenopodioides (L.) Aellen (1933); Chenopodium chenopodioides var. degenianum (Aellen) Aellen (1943); Chenopodium chenopodioides var. lengyelianum (Aellen) Aellen (1943); Chenopodium concatenatum Thuill. (1799); Chenopodium crassifolium Hornem. (1813); Chenopodium crassifolium var. degenianum Aellen (1927); Chenopodium crassifolium var. lengyelianum Aellen (1927); Chenopodium humifusum Kitt. (1843), nom. illeg.; Chenopodium rubrum var. botryoides (Sm.) Dumort. (1827); Chenopodium rubrum subsp. botryoides (Sm.) Hook.f. (1870); Chenopodium rubrum var. crassifolium (Hornem.) Neilr. (1851); Chenopodium rubrum subsp. crassifolium (Hornem.) Maire (1931); Oreobliton chenopodioides (L.) Coss. & Durieu (1855); Oxybasis minutiflora Kar. & Kir.(1842)

= Oxybasis chenopodioides =

Species of plant

Oxybasis chenopodioides (syn. Chenopodium chenopodioides) is a species of flowering plant in the family Amaranthaceae known by the common name saltmarsh goosefoot (or low goosefoot in America). It is native to Europe, Asia and parts of Africa, where it grows on bare mud in brackish hollows in coastal grassland, inland salt steppes and salty deserts. It has spread to similar habitats in both North and South America. Its habitat is an uncommon one and is threatened by agricultural improvement in many areas, but overall its populations are stable. This species often grows with, and is easily confused with the closely related red goosefoot.

== Description ==
Saltmarsh Goosefoot is an annual herb, up about 30 cm (sometimes as much as 50 cm) tall, but often growing prostrate along the ground. Its roots are short and fibrous, and the whole plant is easily lifted out of the soil. The stem is angular and often branched towards the base, with the branches generally occurring in (subopposite) pairs. The whole plant is glabrous (hairless), albeit sometimes with mealy vesicular hairs on the leaves, and it can be either green or crimson in colour (often both).

The leaves are alternate, with a short (ca. 0.8 cm) petiole and no stipules. The leaf blades can be up to 8 cm long by 6 cm wide, but are usually much smaller than this, typically 2–3 cm long. The lamina is quite thick and fleshy, triangular to ovate in outline, and will be either entire (untoothed) or just with a few obscure teeth on the margin.

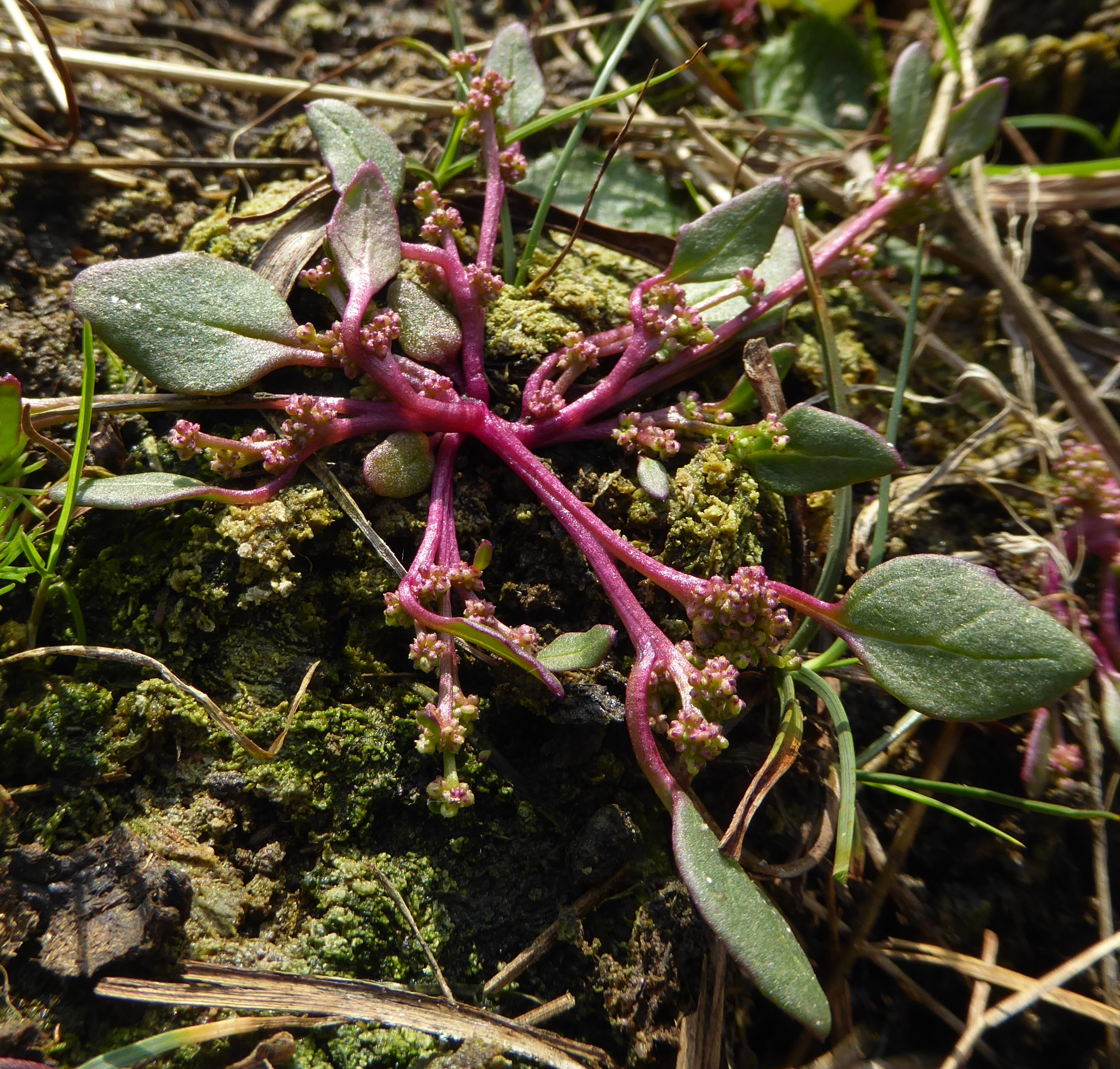
A small plant exhibiting typical colouration

Flowering occurs from July to September in northern Europe. The inflorescences are technically panicles, with a branched structure and clusters of glomerules (bunches of flowers on very short stalks) but they often look like spikes (sessile flowers on a single stem). The glomerules consist of 10-20 small, red flowers of two types: the terminal ones are bisexual, with 5 tepals, 5 stamens and 2 stigmas; the lateral ones can be bisexual or female with 3-5 tepals and 0-3 stamens. The fruit is an achene which falls while still contained within the perianth.

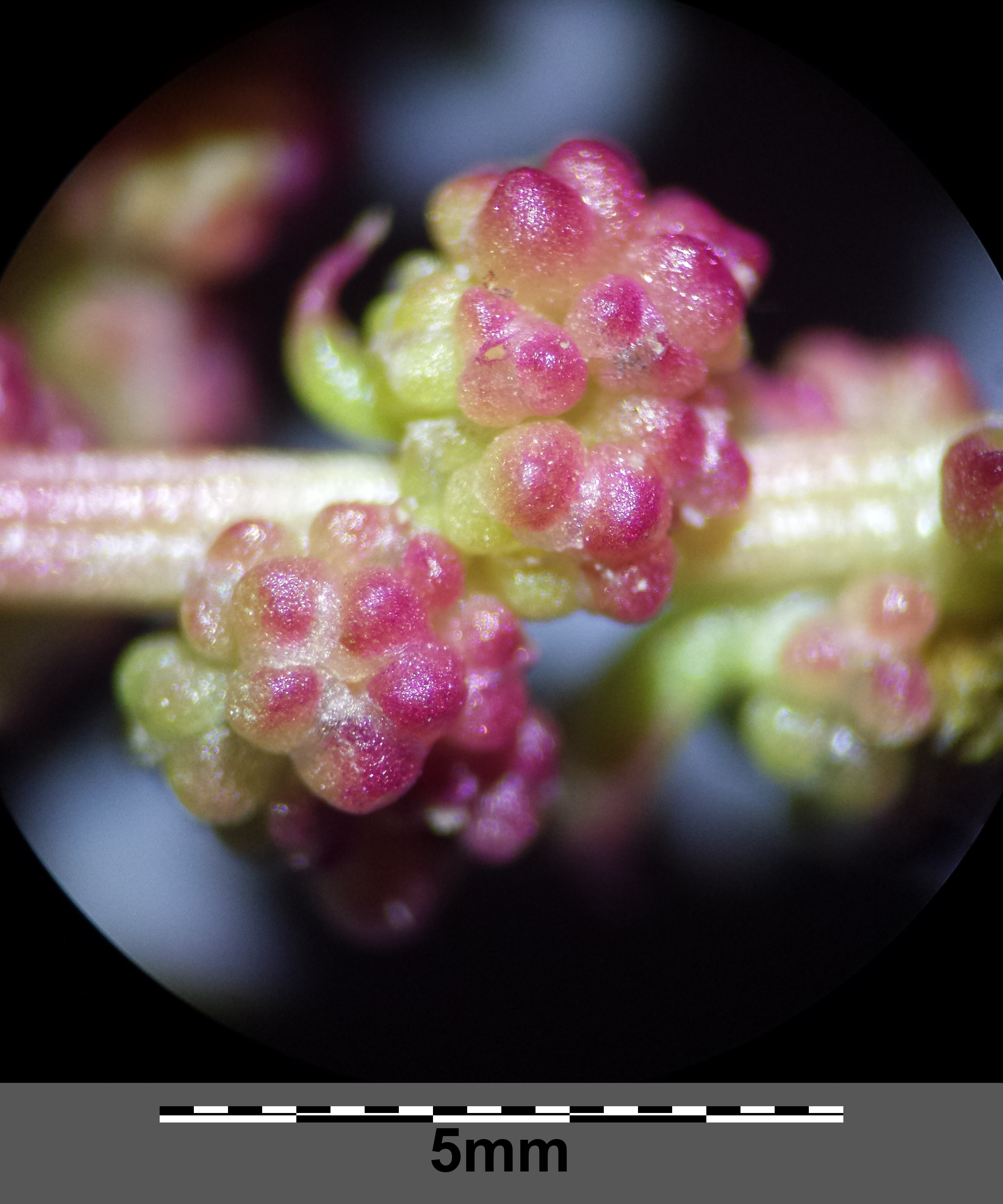
The flowers have 3-5 purplish tepals forming an almost closed ball

== Taxonomy ==
The original name (basionym) of this species was Blitum chenopodioides, as coined by Linnaeus in his work Mantissa plantarum in 1771. Under the Linnaean system, the genus Blitum was differentiated from Chenopodium by having just one (rather than five) stamens. This strict reliance on flower structure declined with time, however, and it has until recently been known as Chenopodium chenopodioides, the name assigned to it by Paul Aellen in 1933. However, in 2012, an analysis of the relationships of the many species in the Chenopodioideae by Susy Fuentes-Bazan and colleagues resulted in its reassignment to the new genus Oxybasis, along with red goosefoot and some related plants.

A large number of other synonyms have been coined over the years, most notably Blitum botryoides (by Solomon Drejer in 1877) and B. crassifolium (by Heinrich Reichenbach in 1832). A full list is given in Plants of the World Online.

Several subspecies and varieties have been named over the years but none is currently accepted, although Sell & Murrell recently described var. lengyleianum Aellen as an erect and richly branched plant, while var. degenianum Aellen is a prostrate form. They may be kept separate by self-pollination.

Its chromosome number is 2n = 18, but it often exhibits endopolyploidy, where certain somatic cells have more than one set of chromosomes, often as an adaptation to stress.

The generic name Oxybasis was coined by Grigorij Karelin and Ivan Kirilov in 1841, while chenopodioides means "like a goosefoot." In England it is known as saltmarsh goosefoot, while Americans call it low goosefoot or buttered goosefoot.

== Identification ==
Saltmarsh goosefoot can be very difficult to separate from red goosefoot. Under normal circumstances, saltmarsh goosefoot is a low-growing plant with almost entire leaves, whereas red goosefoot is a much larger, erect plant with very definite leaf lobes and teeth. However, both plants are variable in these regards and sometimes they are almost indistinguishable. Either species can be predominantly red or green in colour. The key difference is that the tepals of the lateral fruits are fused to nearly the tip in saltmarsh goosefoot (i.e. forming an almost complete ball), while those of red goosefoot are only fused half way, allowing more of the seed to be seen. This character should be used when the fruit are mature.

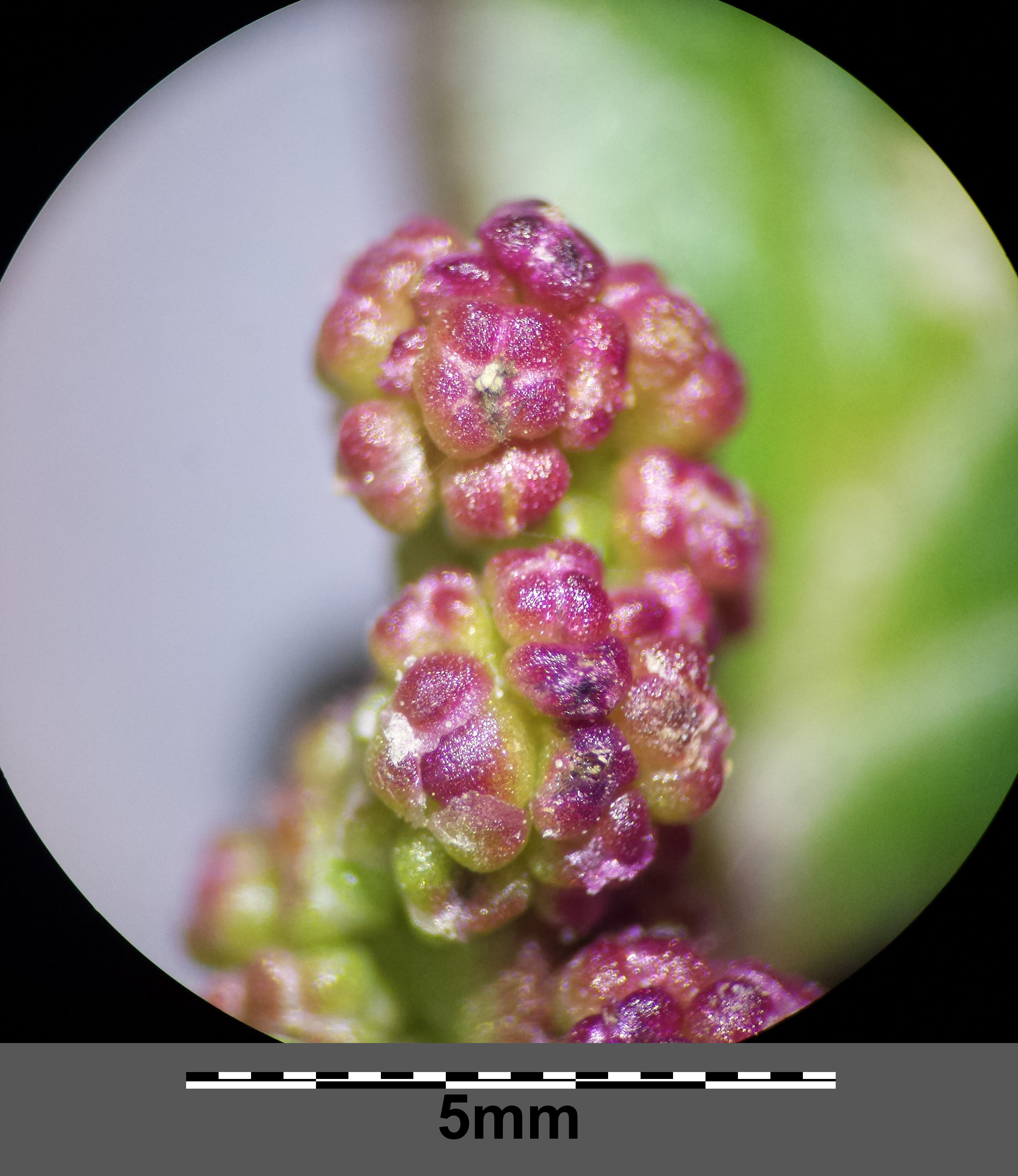
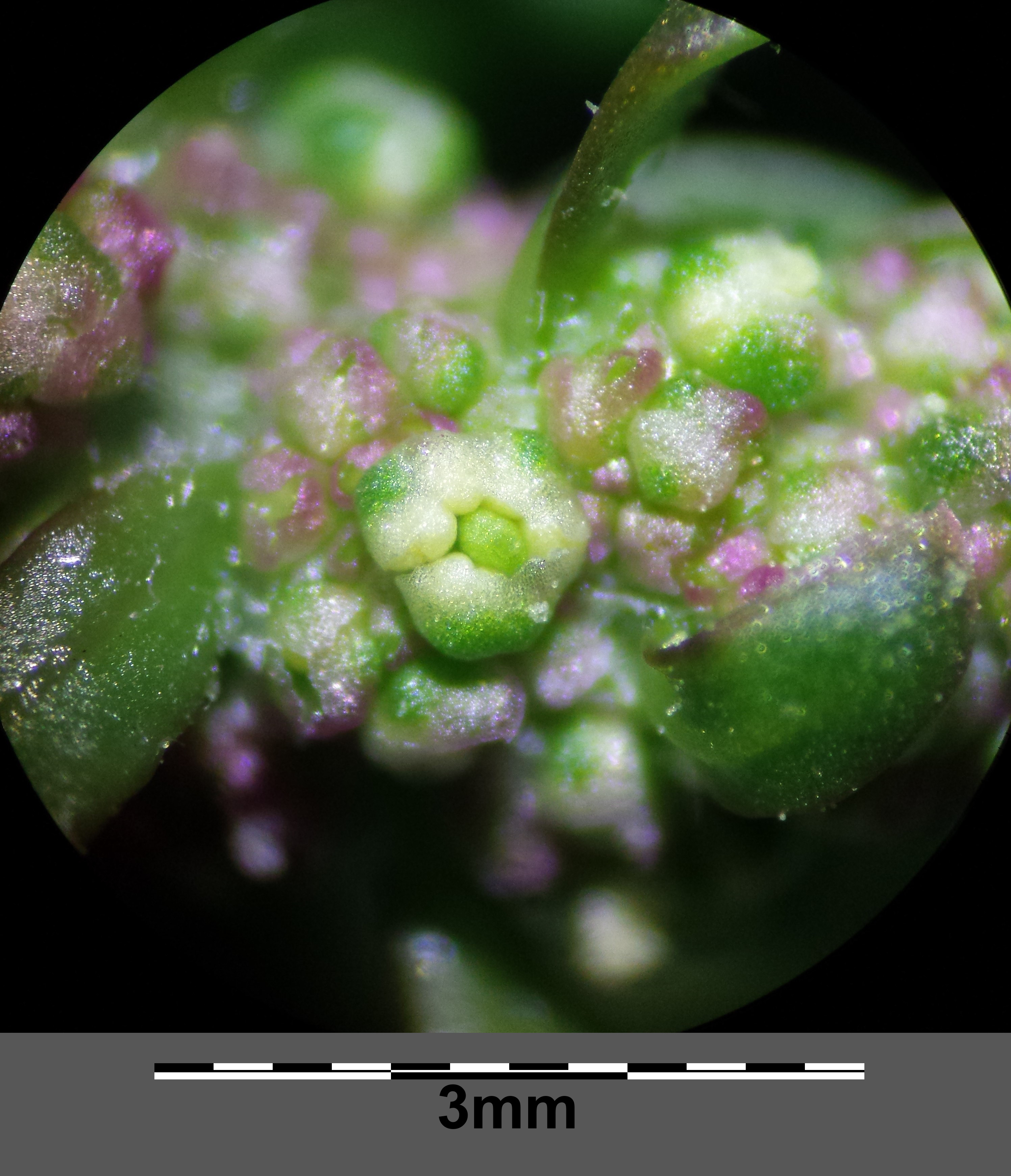
Flowers of saltmarsh goosefoot (left), with fused tepals, and red goosefoot (right), with separate tepals

== Distribution and status ==
Saltmarsh goosefoot is native to southern Europe, Asia and parts of North Africa, and widely established throughout the Americas. In central to southern Africa it is known from Kenya, Burundi, Namibia and South Africa and it has recently been added to the flora of the Congo from a specimen collected in 1914. It is thought to have been carried to this region by migrating birds, which would make it a native species there, albeit on the edge of its range.

In the United States, by contrast, it is usually considered to be a casual, presumably introduced by humans. It has occurred in New York since at least 1894, but it dies out quite quickly. In western North America it is well established in the Rocky Mountains, from British Columbia to California, where it grows in sagebrush desert vegetation, usually on roadsides.

Some American publications state that "low goosefoot" is a native of South America, where it has been known since at least 1891, when it was collected at Soriano in Uruguay. It is sometimes considered to be a plant of the coast of Argentina, but there are few records of it there.

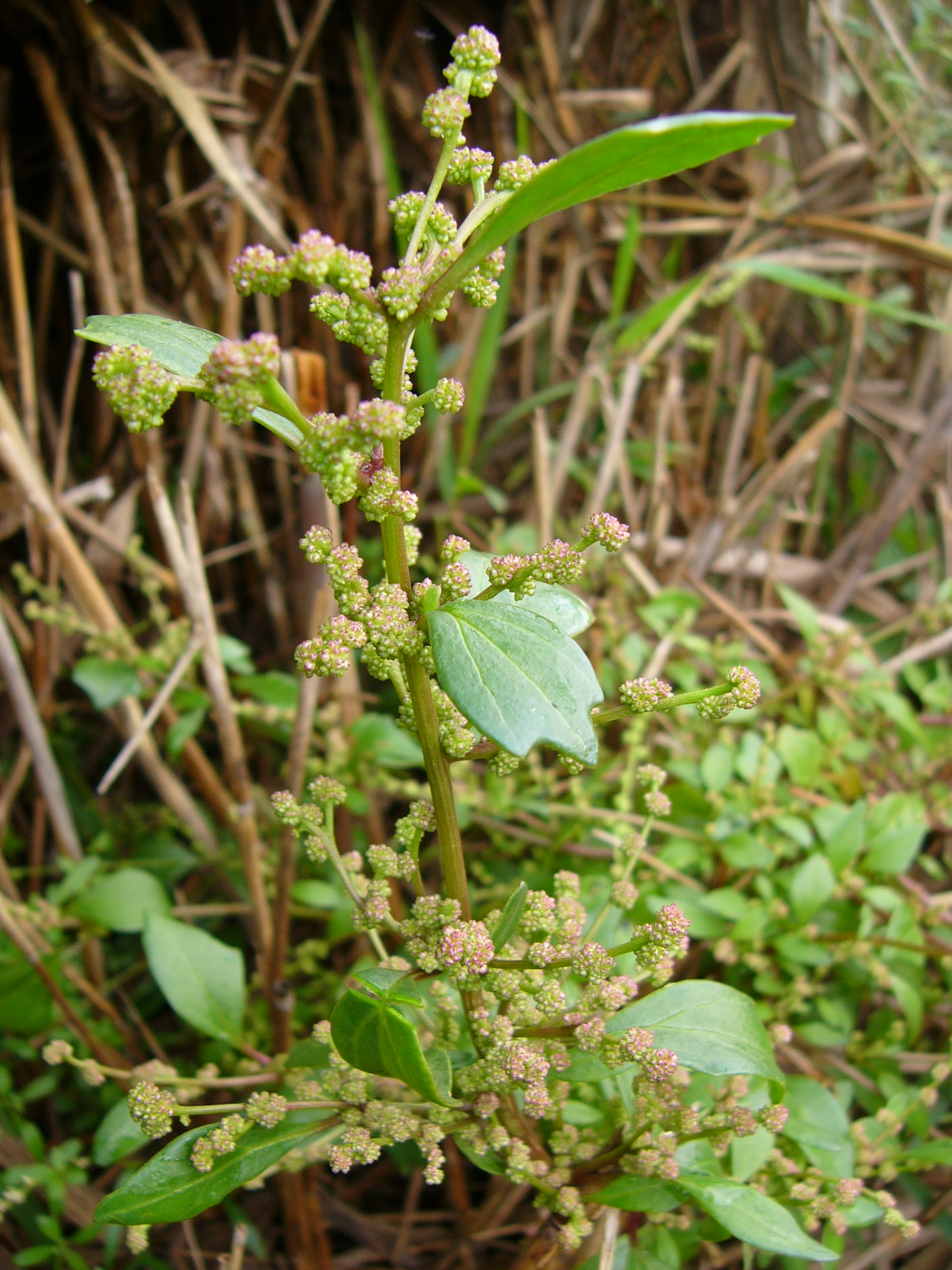

In France, Oxybaside faux chénopode occurs mainly around the coast and has a status of LC (Least Concern) in Corsica and the southern départements, but it is considered VU (Vulnerable) in the Nord-Pas-de-Calais and CR (critically rare) in Picardie. It is also vulnerable inland, in Lorraine.

It is considered to be rare in Italy, where it is distributed around the coast of the mainland, Sicily and Sardinia, but is restricted by the lack of suitable habitat.

The first British record (as Chenopodium botryodes Sm.) was published by J.E. Smith in English Botany in 1811. In 1962 it was shown to be largely confined to coastal grasslands in the south east of England (Kent and Essex), and that has not changed since then. It is currently considered to be nationally scarce, but not threatened, with an IUCN status of LC (Least Concern). It is regarded as an axiophyte of conservation habitats.

The Global Biodiversity Information Forum map shows saltmarsh goosefoot extending across the central steppe of Asia as far as eastern Siberia. It just extends into China in parts of the Gobi Desert, where it is found in salt flats.

== Habitat and ecology ==
The usual habitat for saltmarsh goosefoot is not in salt marsh at all, but in grasslands with some brackish influence, often close to coasts. It is typically found in shallow depressions, where winter flooding lasts into the spring, creating patches of bare ground. It is late to germinate and only flowers in the autumn, so a lack of competition is important. Inland, it is usually associated with natural salt deposits or possibly with salt-treated roadside verges.

Under the EUNIS habitat classification system, saltmarsh goosefoot is a characteristic plant of the Pannonic salt steppes of south-east Europe, and specifically of the salty E6.2131 Puccinellia distans hollows that are found in this type of grassland. In this inland vegetation, it is evaporation of surface water in dry summers that creates the brackish conditions, rather than the influence of the sea, and the salts are mainly carbonates and sulphates rather than chlorides. This is a priority habitat, and many Natura 2000 sites are designated for its protection.

The equivalent habitats in southern France are the halo-nitrophile lawns of the Mediterranean coasts of the mainland and Corsica (Corine code 22.343), which are also a priority habitat for conservation. This vegetation is found in grazed pastures, and contains such species as spear-leaved orache, annual beard-grass and strapwort. Its vegetation communities include toad rush-saltmarsh goosefoot community (mainly on the Atlantic coast), and Echinochloa crus-galli-Sporobolus schoenoides and Gnaphalium uliginosum-Sporobolus schoenoides vegetation on the Mediterranean.

In Italy the typical habitat appears slightly different. It is found on sandy, almost bare soils which are inundated in the winter and dry out in summer, allowing for a 4-month growing season from August to November. It usually occurs on the coast, in association with plants such as Salicornia perennans and Suaeda maritima, but is sometimes found inland at heights up to 180 m.

Britain is at the northern edge of its natural range, and saltmarsh goosefoot is largely restricted to the grazing marshes of the Thames Estuary, where it grows on the banks of brackish ditches that are poached by cattle, or in shallow rills in the fields, which dry out in the summer. Populations fluctuate dramatically with the weather, flourishing only after a hot summer. It is sufficiently rare that it is not described in any vegetation community; nor does it have any known insect associations.
