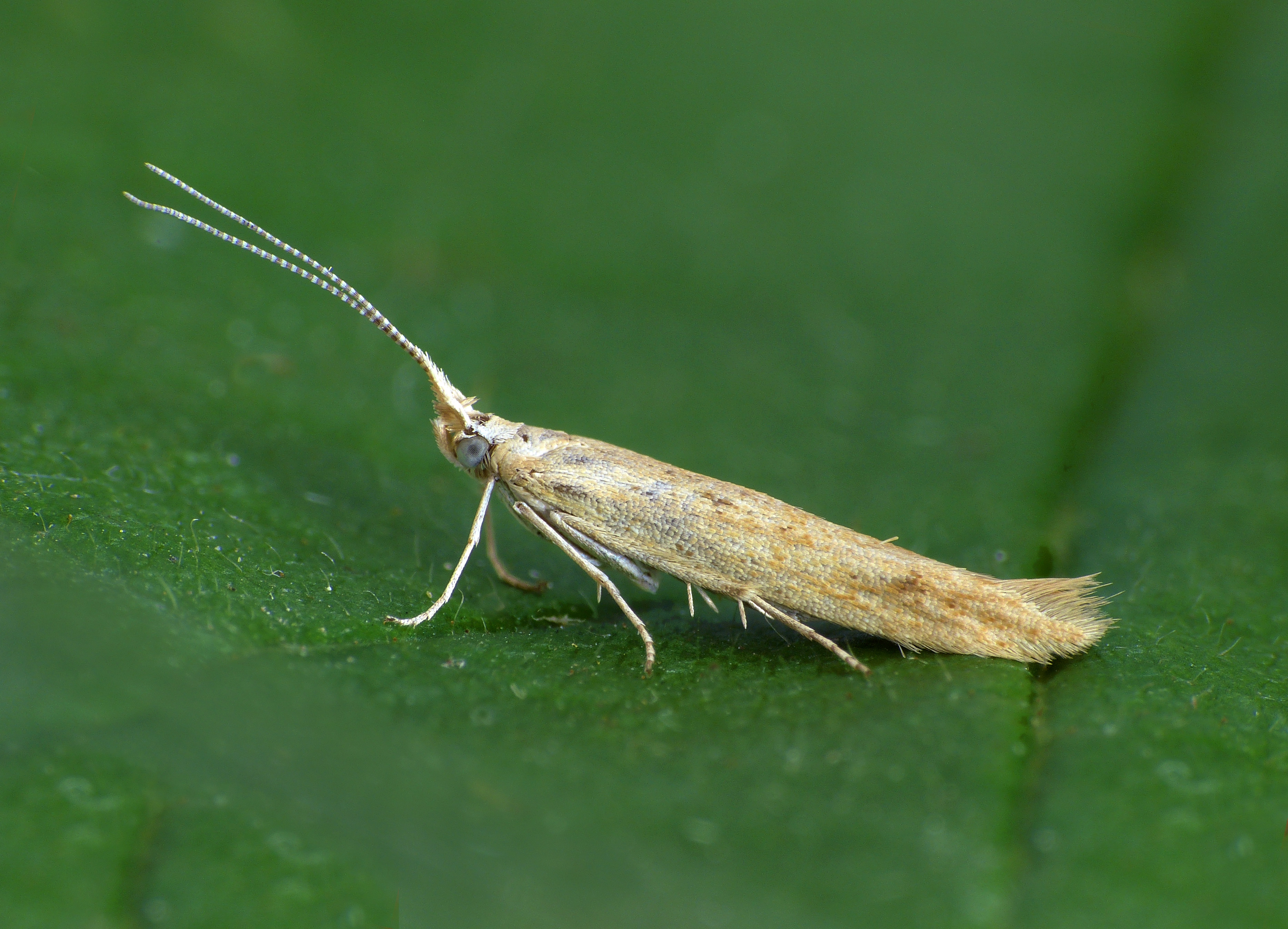

Scientific classification
- Kingdom: Animalia
- Phylum: Arthropoda
- Class: Insecta
- Order: Lepidoptera
- Family: Coleophoridae
- Genus: Coleophora
- Species: C. clypeiferella

Binomial name
- Coleophora clypeiferella Hofmann, 1871

Synonyms
- Ionescumia clypeiferella

= Coleophora clypeiferella =

Species of moth

Coleophora clypeiferella is a moth of the family Coleophoridae. It is found from Fennoscandia to France, Austria, Hungary and Bulgaria and from Great Britain to Latvia, Lithuania and Ukraine. It is also known from the Caucasus and Ural regions of Russia and China. It occurs in steppe and cultivated areas.

The wingspan is about 14 mm (0.55 in). They are on wing in July and August.

The larvae feed on Chenopodium album, Chenopodium rubrum and Chenopodium murale.
