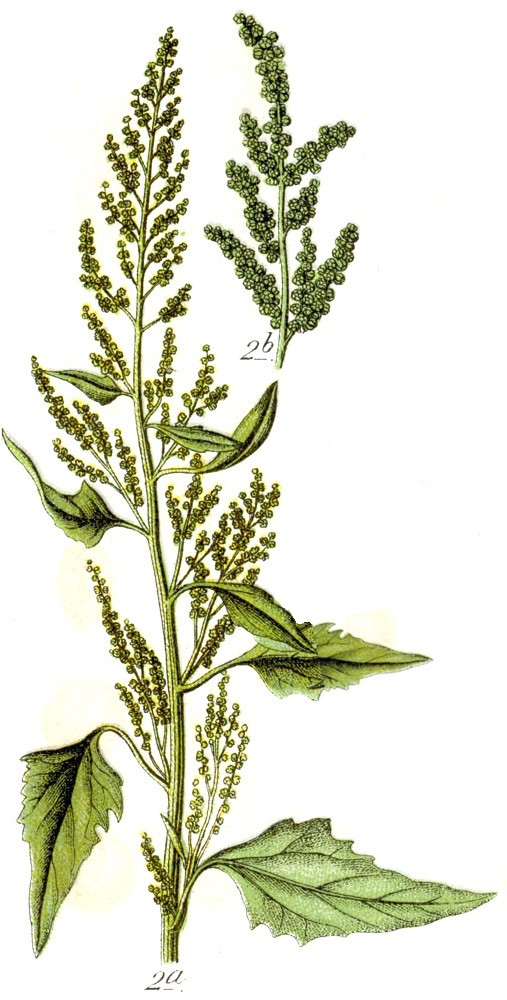

Scientific classification
- Kingdom: Plantae
- Clade: Tracheophytes
- Clade: Angiosperms
- Clade: Eudicots
- Order: Caryophyllales
- Family: Amaranthaceae
- Genus: Oxybasis
- Species: O. urbica

Binomial name
- Oxybasis urbica (L.) S.Fuentes, Uotila & Borsch

= Oxybasis urbica =

Species of flowering plant

Oxybasis urbica is a species of flowering plant belonging to the family Amaranthaceae.

Its native range is Europe to Russian Far East and Northern China.
