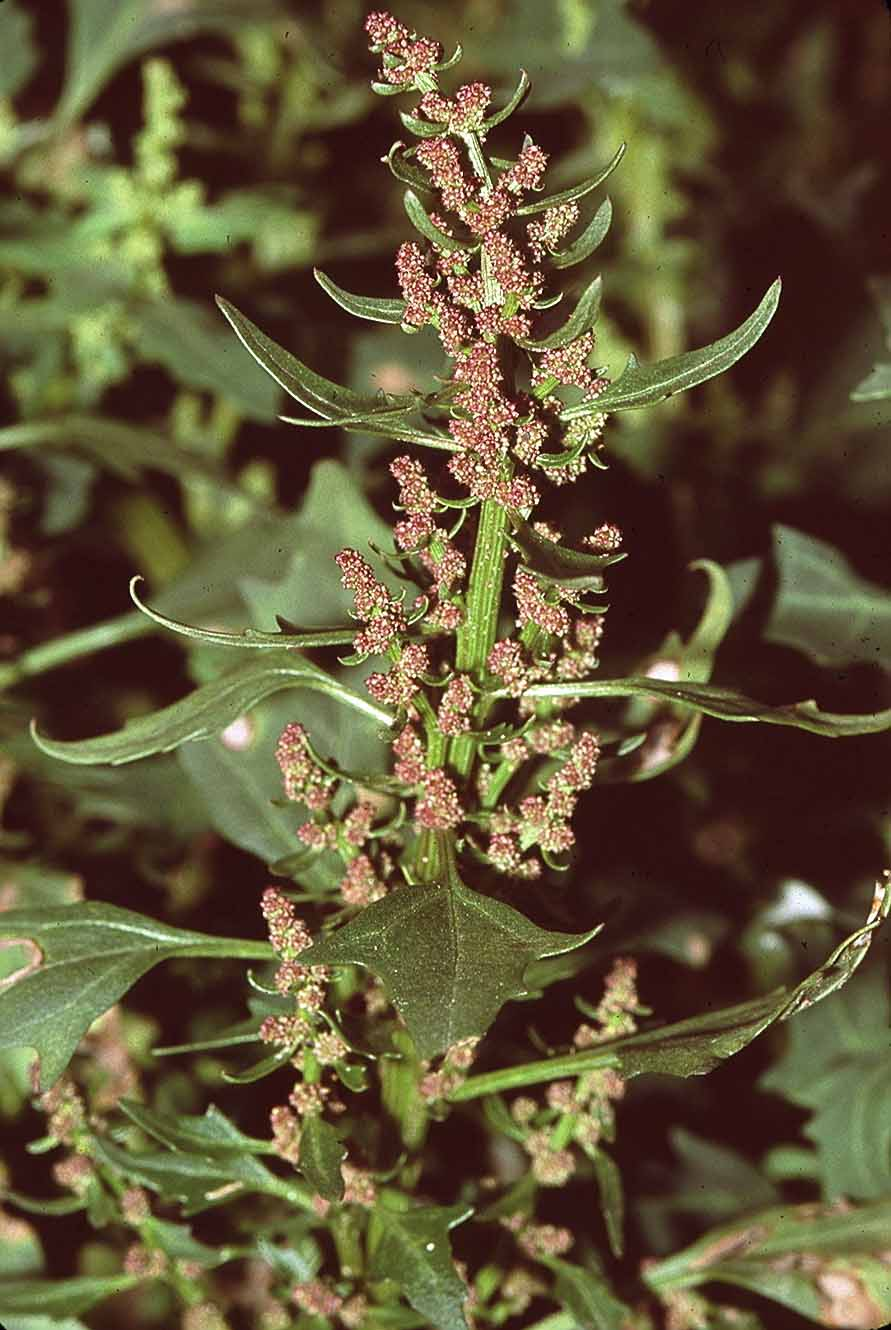
- red goosefoot (Oxybasis rubra)

Scientific classification
- Kingdom: Plantae
- Clade: Tracheophytes
- Clade: Angiosperms
- Clade: Eudicots
- Order: Caryophyllales
- Family: Amaranthaceae
- Subfamily: Chenopodioideae
- Tribe: Atripliceae
- Genus: Oxybasis; Kar. & Kir.

Synonyms
- Chenopodium subg. Pseudoblitum Gren. & Godr.; Blitum subg. Pseudoblitum (Gren. & Godr.) Schur; Chenopodium sect. Pseudoblitum (Gren. & Godr.) Syme; Chenopodium [unranked] Rubra Standl.; Chenopodium [unranked] Glauca Standl.; Chenopodium subsect. Glauca (Standl.) A. J. Scott; Chenopodium sect. Glauca (Standl.) Ignatov; Chenopodium [unranked] Urbica Standl.; Chenopodium sect. Urbica (Standl.) Mosyakin; Chenopodium sect. Degenia Aellen

= Oxybasis =

Genus of plants

Oxybasis is a flowering plant genus from the subfamily Chenopodioideae of the family Amaranthaceae. It was first described in 1841, and newly used since 2012 for five species that were traditionally grouped into genus Chenopodium. They occur in Europe, Asia, North Africa and America.

== Description ==
According to Fuentes-Bazan et al. (2012), the species in genus Oxybasis are non-aromatic annual herbs. Their stems grow erect to ascending or prostrate and are branched with usually alternate, basally sometimes nearly opposite branches. The alternate leaves consist of a petiole and a simple blade. The leaf blade is thickish oder slightly fleshy, and may be triangular, triangular to narrowly triangular, hastate, rhombic, or lanceolate, with entire to dentate margins.

The axillary and terminal inflorescences consist of spicately or sometimes paniculately arranged compact glomerules of flowers, ebracteate or in the axils of leaf-like bracts. Usually there a two types of flowers: The terminal flowers are bisexual, with 3-5 nearly free perianth segments, 1 (-5) stamens and an ovary with 2 (-3) stigmas. The lateral flowers are usually female, with 3 (-4) variously connate perianth segments, missing (-1) stamens and 2 stigmas.

The fruit has a membranous pericarp, which is free or loosely attached to the seed. The oval to orbicular seeds are horizontally orientated in terminal flowers, but vertically or horizontally in lateral flowers. The brownish or black seed coat can be almost smooth, finely reticulate, or minutely pitted.

== Systematics ==
The genus Oxybasis was first described in 1841 by Grigori Silytsch Karelin and Ivan Petrovich Kirilov (In: Enumeration plantarum anno 1840 in regionibus altaicis et confinibus collectarum. In: Bulletin de la Société Impériale des Naturalistes de Moscou 14: p. 738–739). At this time, the only species of the genus was Oxybasis minutiflora Kar. & Kir., which was later considered to be identical with Chenopodium chenopodioides.

After phylogenetic research, Suzy Fuentes-Bazan, Pertti Uotila and Thomas Borsch separated the Chenopodium rubrum-Clade from genus Chenopodium, that would otherwise have been polyphyletic. They used the genus name Oxybasis as the oldest name on genus level for this group. The genus Oxybasis belongs to the same tribe as Chenopodium, Tribus Atripliceae.

According to Fuentes-Bazan et al. (2012), the genus Oxybasis consists of 5 species:

- Oxybasis chenopodioides (L.) S. Fuentes, Uotila & Borsch (Syn. Chenopodium chenopodioides (L.) Aellen), small red Goosefoot, saltmarsh goosefoot: in Europe, North Africa and Asia, naturalized in North America and South America.
- Oxybasis glauca (L.) S. Fuentes, Uotila & Borsch (Syn. Chenopodium glaucum L.), Oak-leaved goosefoot: in Europe, Asia and North America.
- Oxybasis macrosperma (Hook. f.) S. Fuentes, Uotila & Borsch (Syn. Chenopodium macrospermum Hook. f.): in South America and on Falkland Islands.
- Oxybasis rubra (L.) S. Fuentes, Uotila & Borsch (Syn. Chenopodium rubrum L.), red goosefoot, coastblite goosefoot: in Europa, temperate Asia, and North America, naturalized elsewhere.
- Oxybasis urbica (L.) S. Fuentes, Uotila & Borsch (Syn. Chenopodium urbicum L.), upright goosefoot: in Europa and Asia, naturalized in North America.
