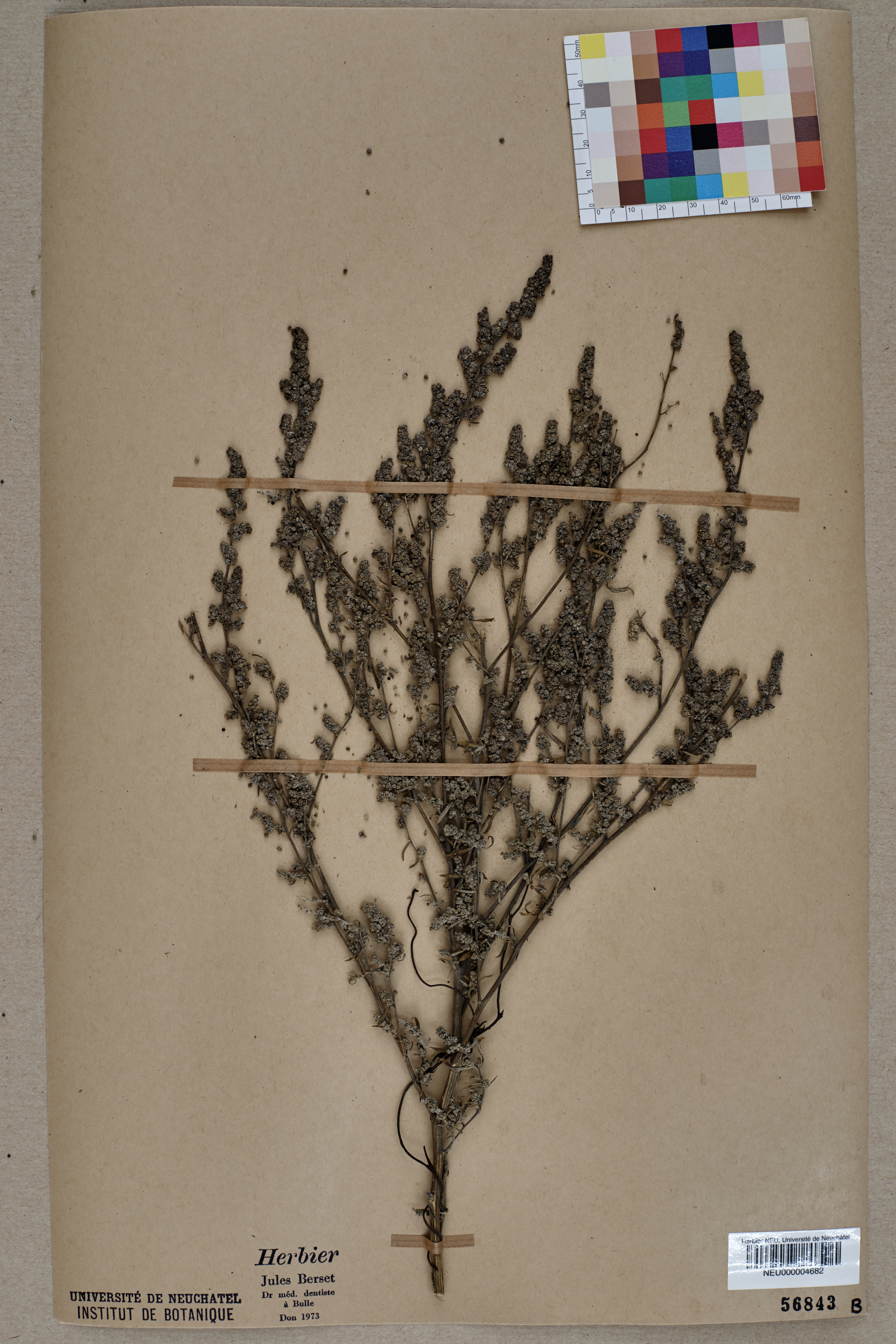

Conservation status
- Secure (NatureServe)

Scientific classification
- Kingdom: Plantae
- Clade: Tracheophytes
- Clade: Angiosperms
- Clade: Eudicots
- Order: Caryophyllales
- Family: Amaranthaceae
- Genus: Chenopodium
- Species: C. pratericola

Binomial name
- Chenopodium pratericola Rydb.

Synonyms
- Chenopodium albescens

= Chenopodium pratericola =

Species of flowering plant

Chenopodium pratericola is a species of flowering plant in the goosefoot family known by the common name desert goosefoot. It is native to much of western and central North America, where it grows in many types of open habitat, such as sagebrush, often on alkaline soils.

It is an annual herb growing up to 65 to 75 centimeters tall, sometimes branching. It is powdery in texture, especially on the leaves and flowers. The leaves are oval to lance-shaped and some are lobed. The inflorescences are located in leaf axils and in panicles at the end of the stem. Each is a small, dense cluster of tiny flowers.
