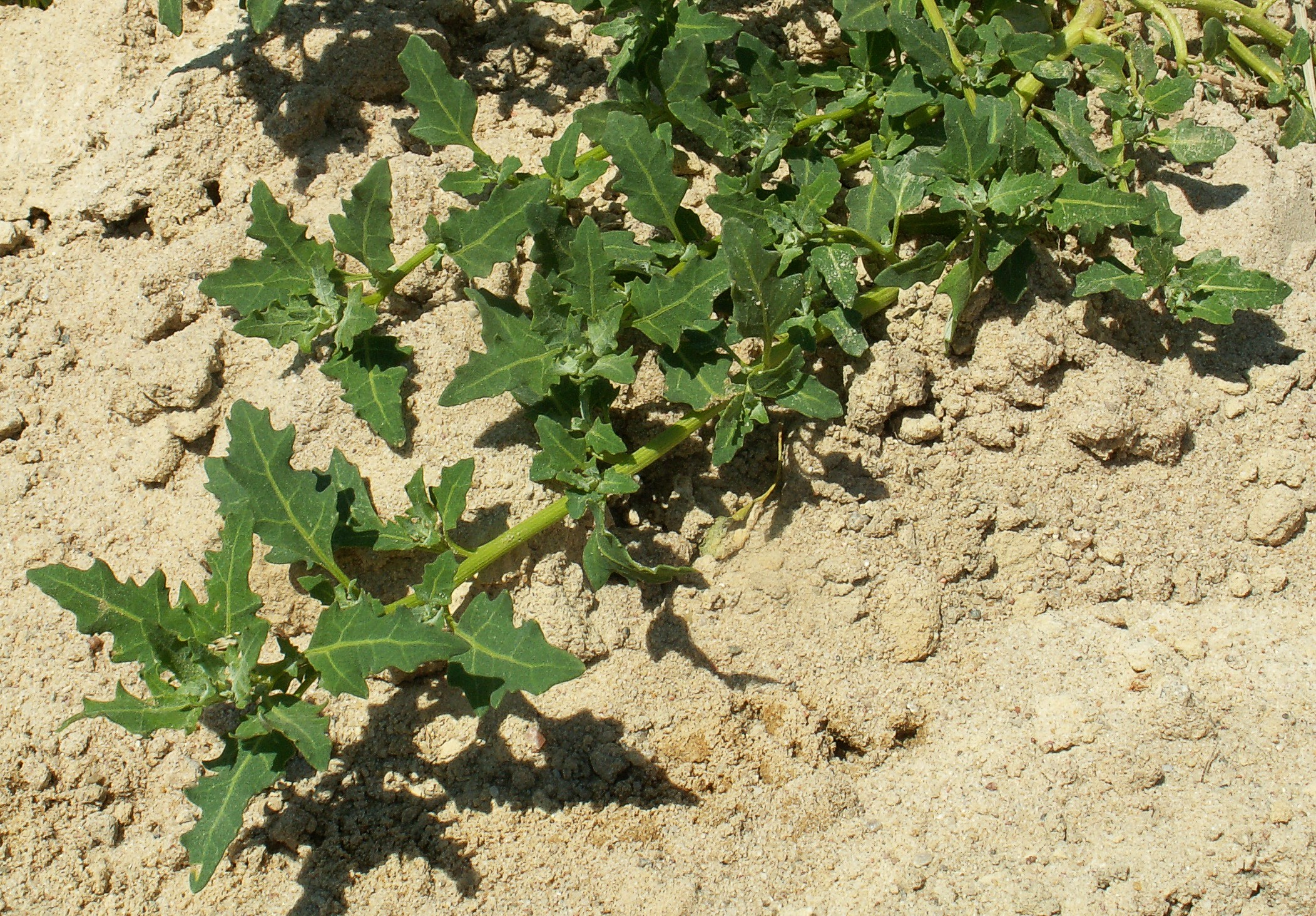

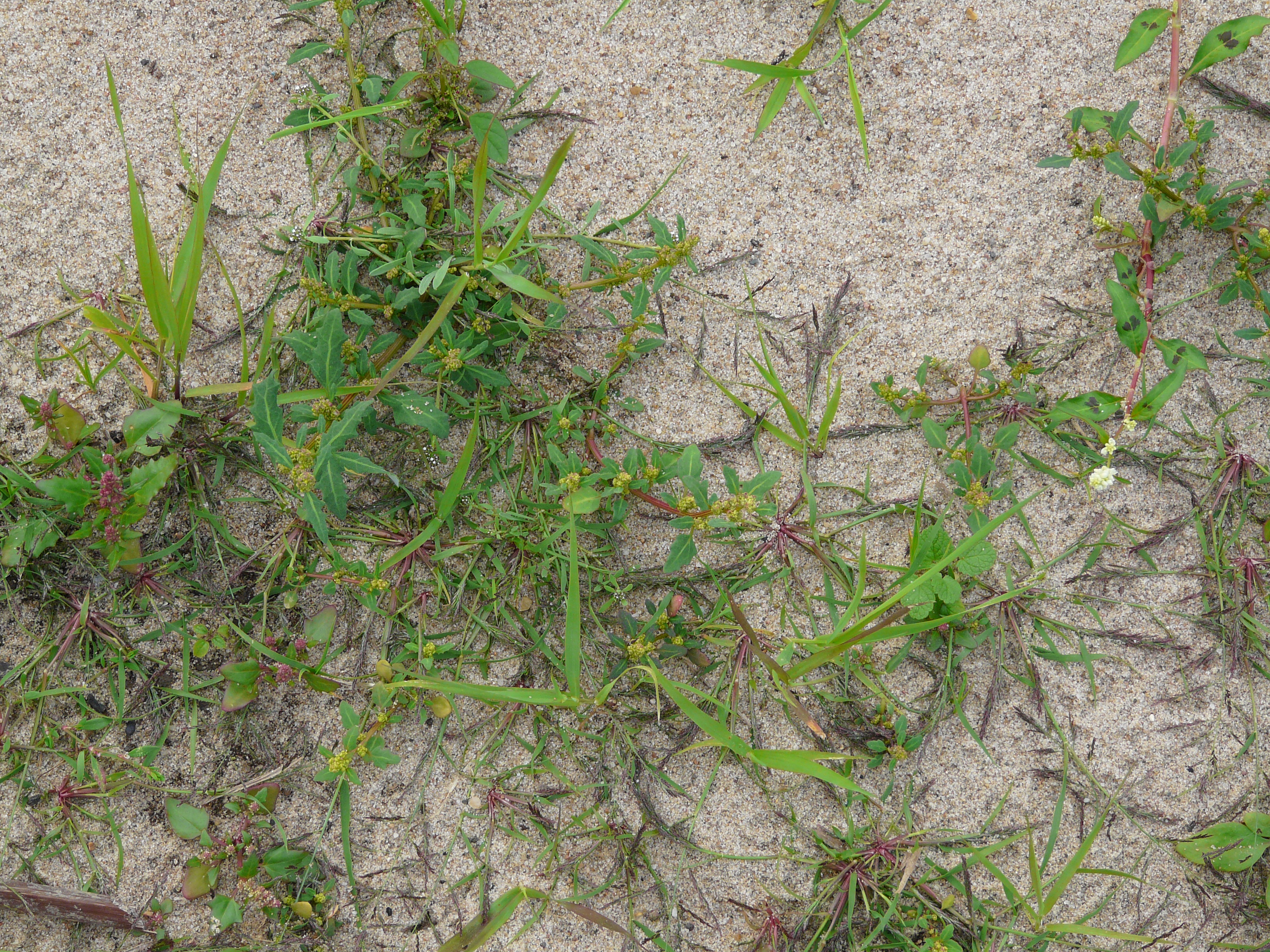

Scientific classification
- Kingdom: Plantae
- Clade: Tracheophytes
- Clade: Angiosperms
- Clade: Eudicots
- Order: Caryophyllales
- Family: Amaranthaceae
- Genus: Oxybasis
- Species: O. glauca

Binomial name
- Oxybasis glauca (L.) S. Fuentes, Uotila & Borsch

Synonyms
- Chenopodium glaucum L..; Blitum glaucum (L.) W.D.J.Koch; Orthospermum glaucum (L.) Opiz; Chenopodium ambiguum R.Br.; Chenopodium littorale Moq.

= Oxybasis glauca =

Oak-leaved goosefoot

Species of flowering plant

Oxybasis glauca (syn. Chenopodium glaucum), common name oak-leaved goosefoot, is a species of goosefoot plant native to Europe. It has been introduced to North America, where it has become an invasive weed, and North Korea, where it grows in trampled habitats.

== Gallery ==
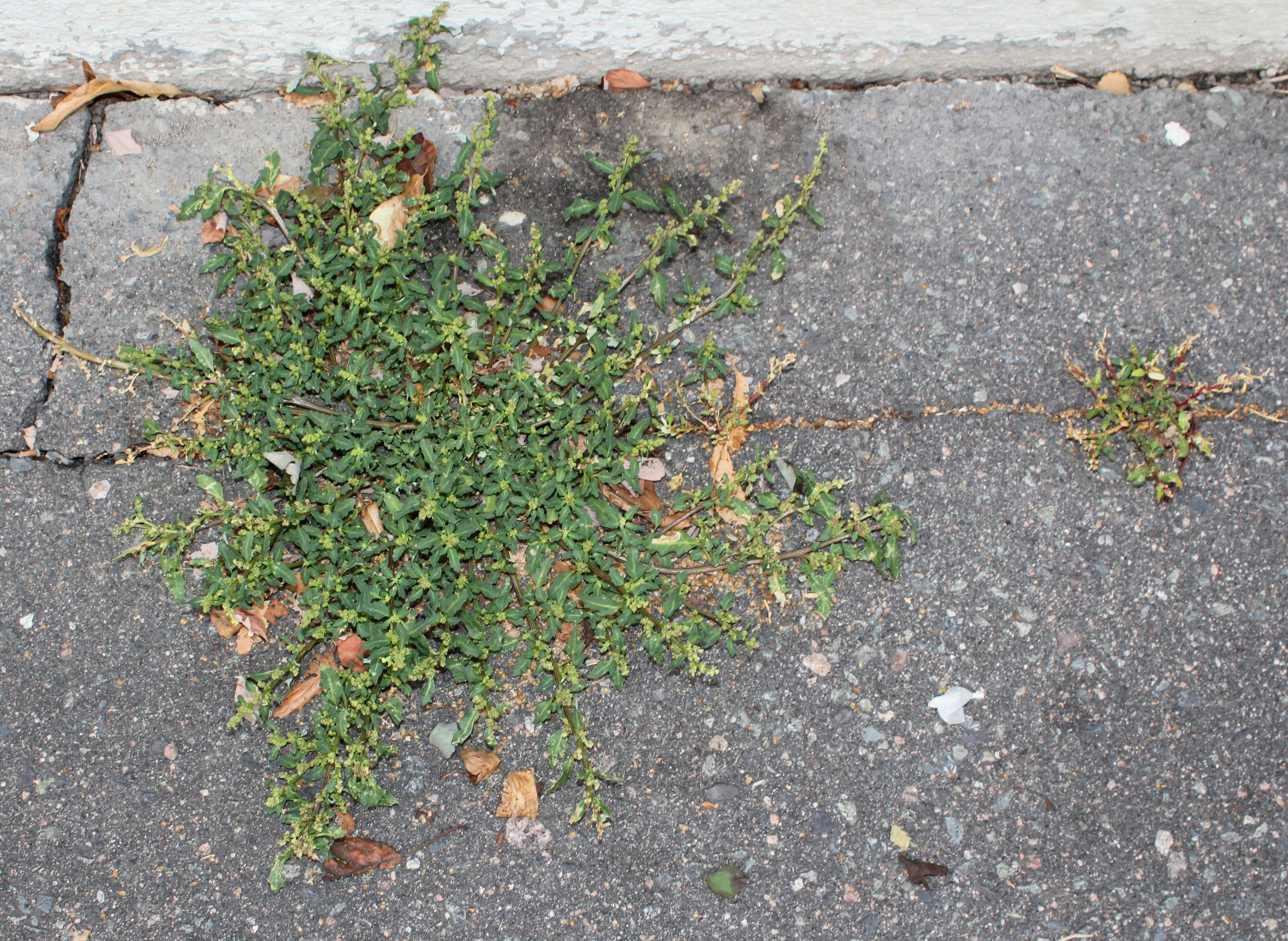

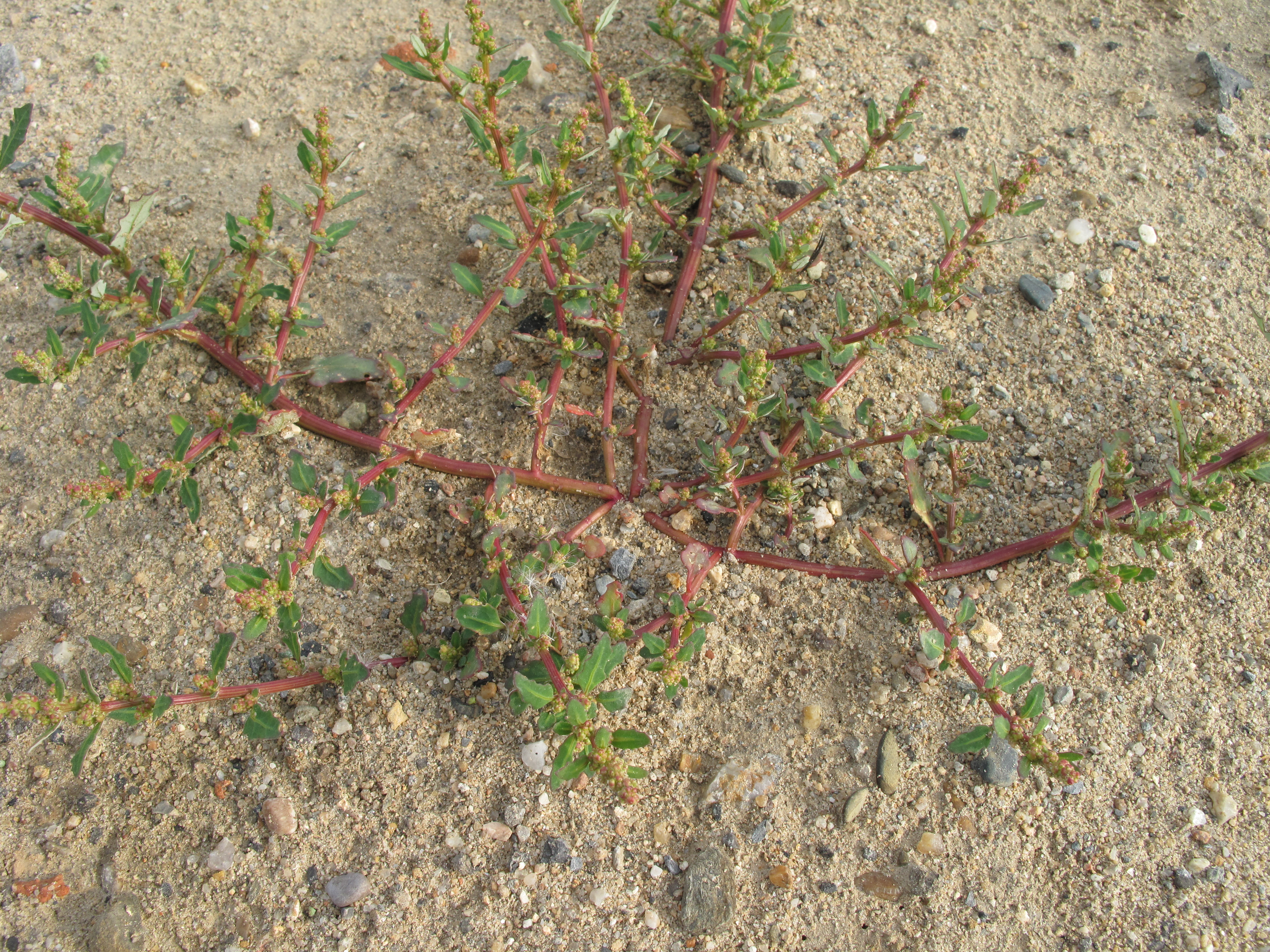

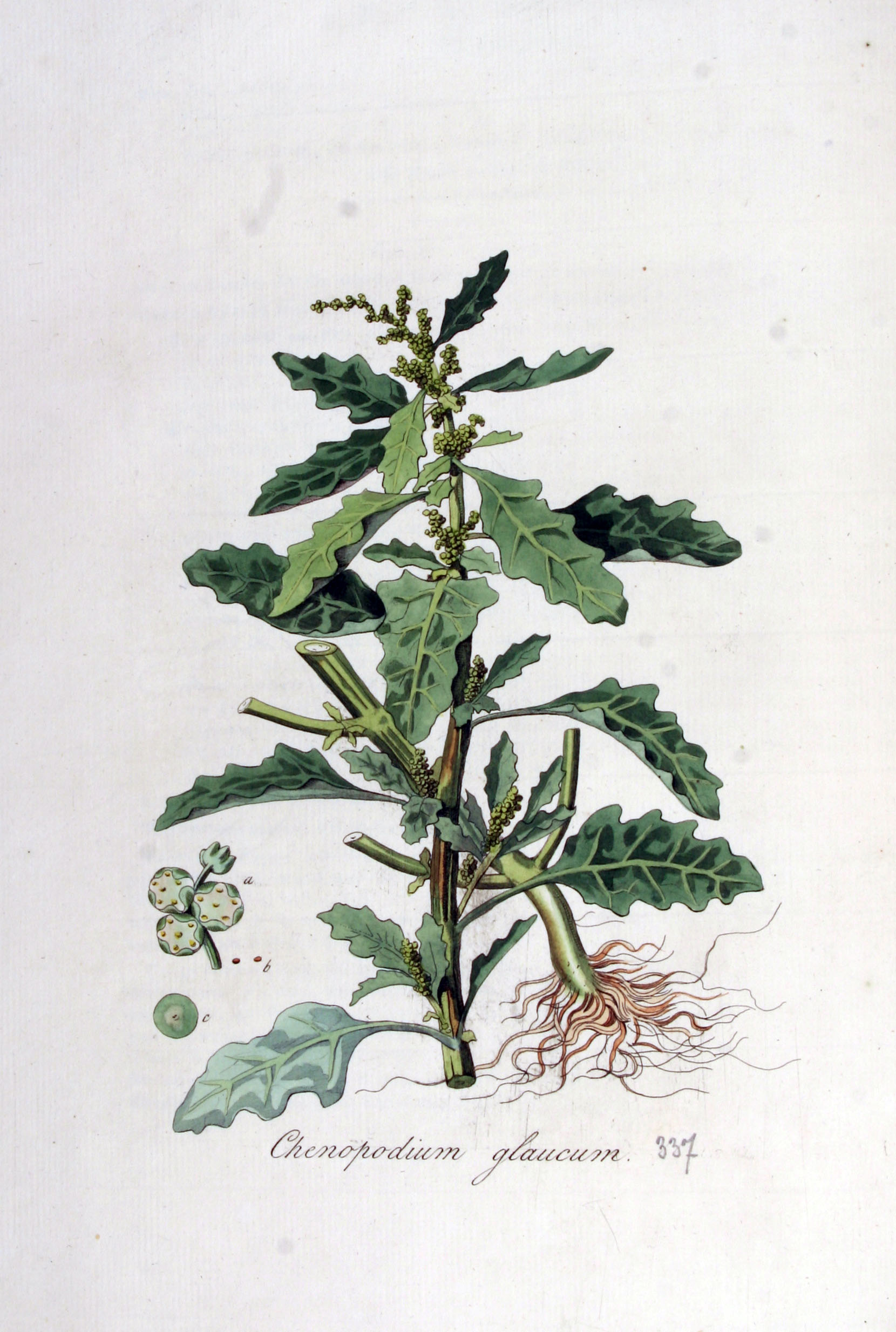

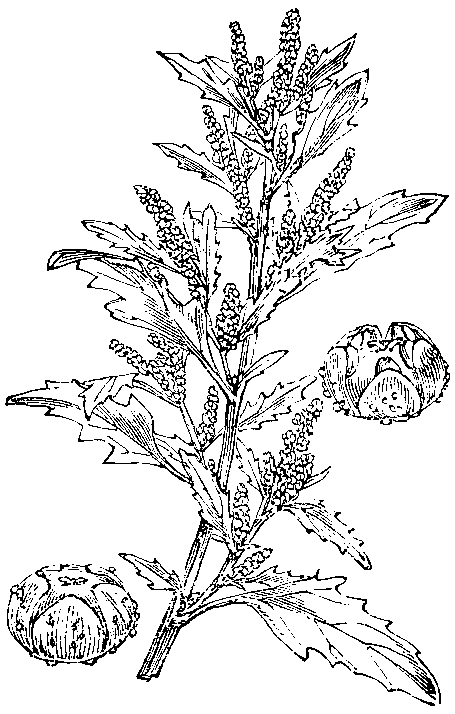

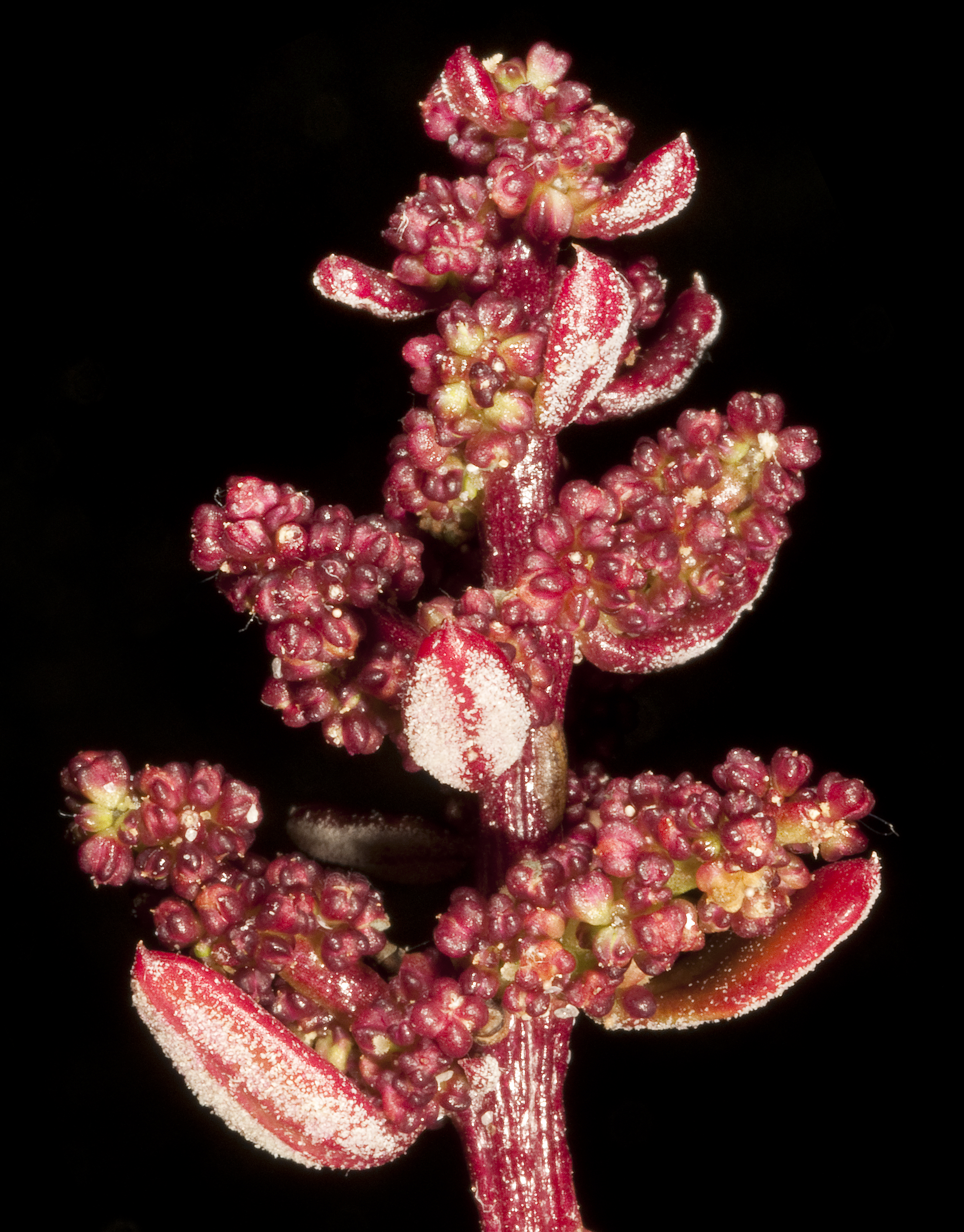

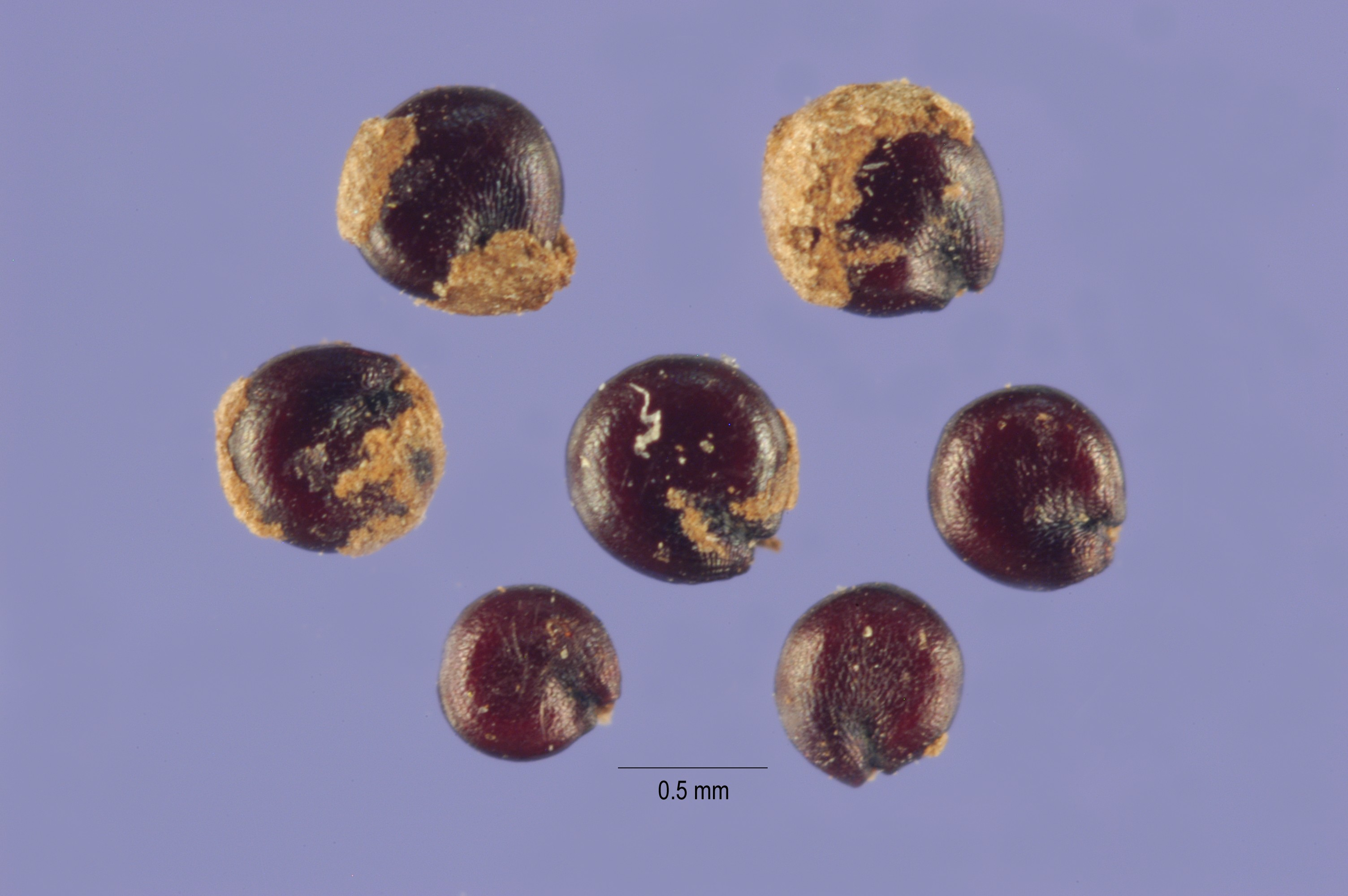
