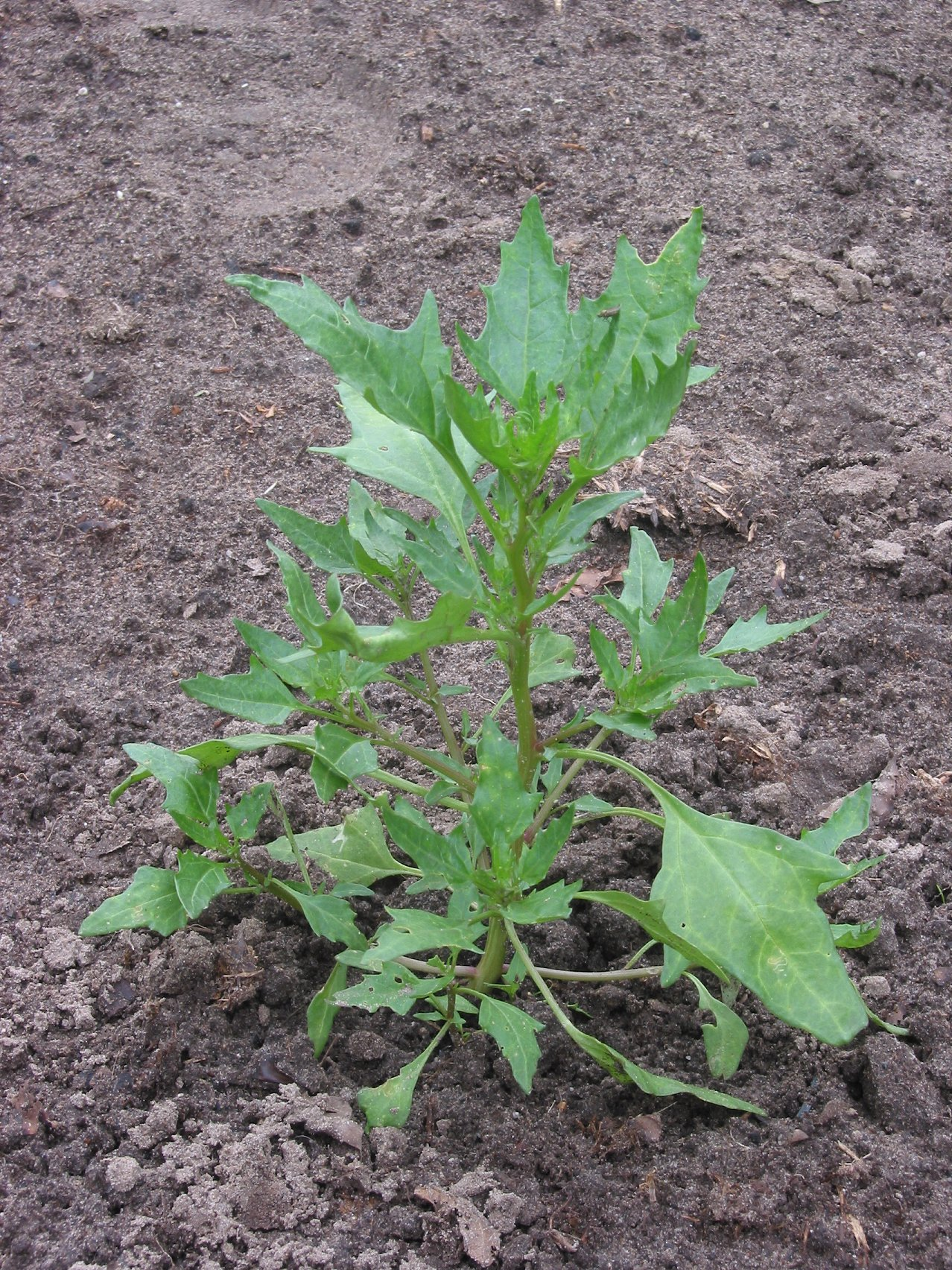

Conservation status
- Least Concern (IUCN 3.1)

Scientific classification
- Kingdom: Plantae
- Clade: Tracheophytes
- Clade: Angiosperms
- Clade: Eudicots
- Order: Caryophyllales
- Family: Amaranthaceae
- Genus: Oxybasis
- Species: O. rubra

Binomial name
- Oxybasis rubra (L.) S. Fuentes, Uotila & Borsch

Synonyms
- List: Chenopodium rubrum L.; Atriplex rubra (L.) Crantz; Blitum polymorphum var. rubrum (L.) Beck; Blitum rubrum (L.) Rchb.; Botrys rubra (L.) Lunell; Orthospermum rubrum (L.) Opiz; Orthosporum rubrum (L.) T. Nees

= Oxybasis rubra =

Species of flowering plant

Oxybasis rubra (until recently known as Chenopodium rubrum), red goosefoot, is an annual plant in the amaranth family. It is native to North America and Eurasia.

== Description ==
Red goosefoot is a variable plant, an annual growing from just a few centimetres tall to as much as 1.5 m, usually erect but sometimes procumbent. It is sometimes quite fleshy plant, always glabrous, and usually green but sometimes red or, rarely, yellowish. The stems are ridged or angular and often branched, especially close to the base.

The leaves are alternate and roughly diamond-shaped, anything from 1 cm to 15 cm long, with a cuneate base and several lobes or large, blunt teeth. They can be quite succulent, especially in plants growing in brackish conditions. The petiole is about half as long as the basal leaves, shorter in the upper ones, and there is no stipule.

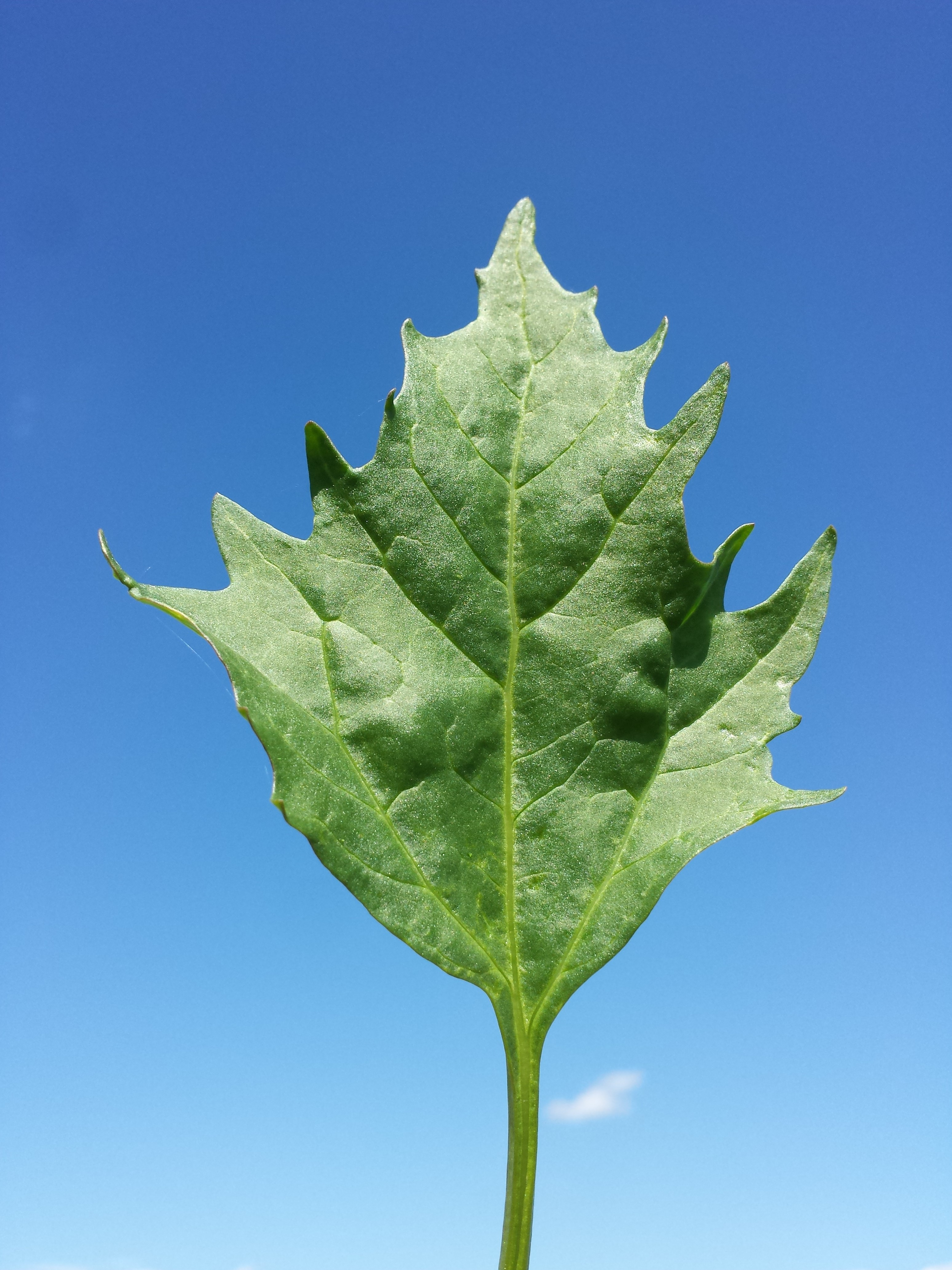
A lower leaf from a well-grown plant

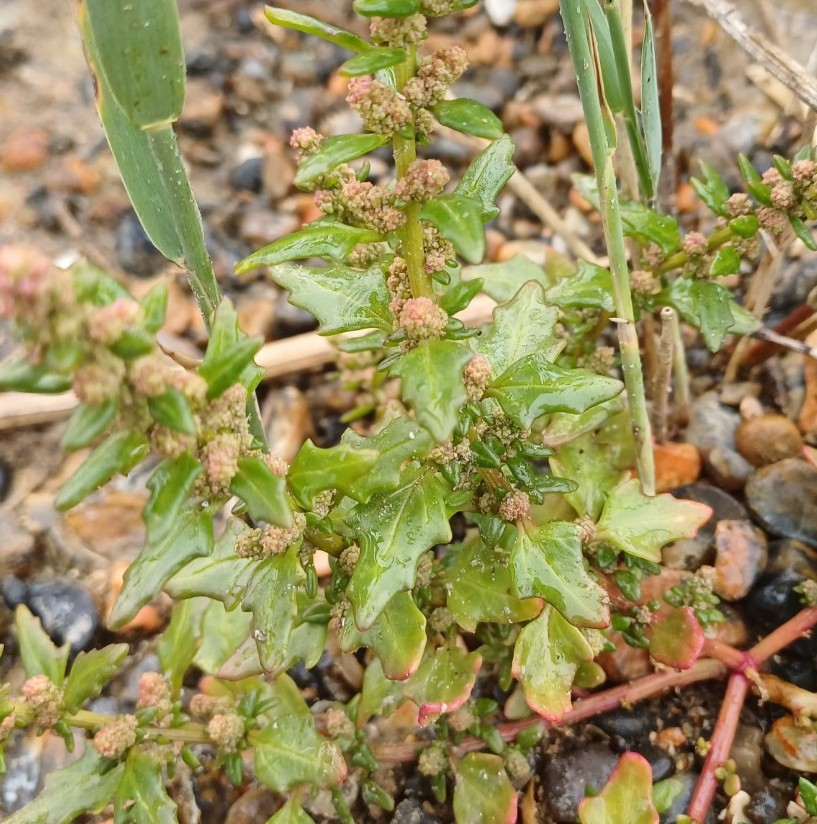
Fleshy leaves of a saltmarsh-grown plant

The inflorescence is essentially a spike with many dense glomerules, or ball-like clusters of flowers, interspersed with simple or leaf-like bracts. The flowers are of two types: the terminal ones being bisexual, with 4-5 perianth segments ("petals"), 4-5 stamens and 2 stigmas; the lateral ones are generally female with 3 perianth segments. When ripe, the achenes (fruits) fall whilst still within the perianth, releasing many small, brown, oval seeds about 1 mm long.

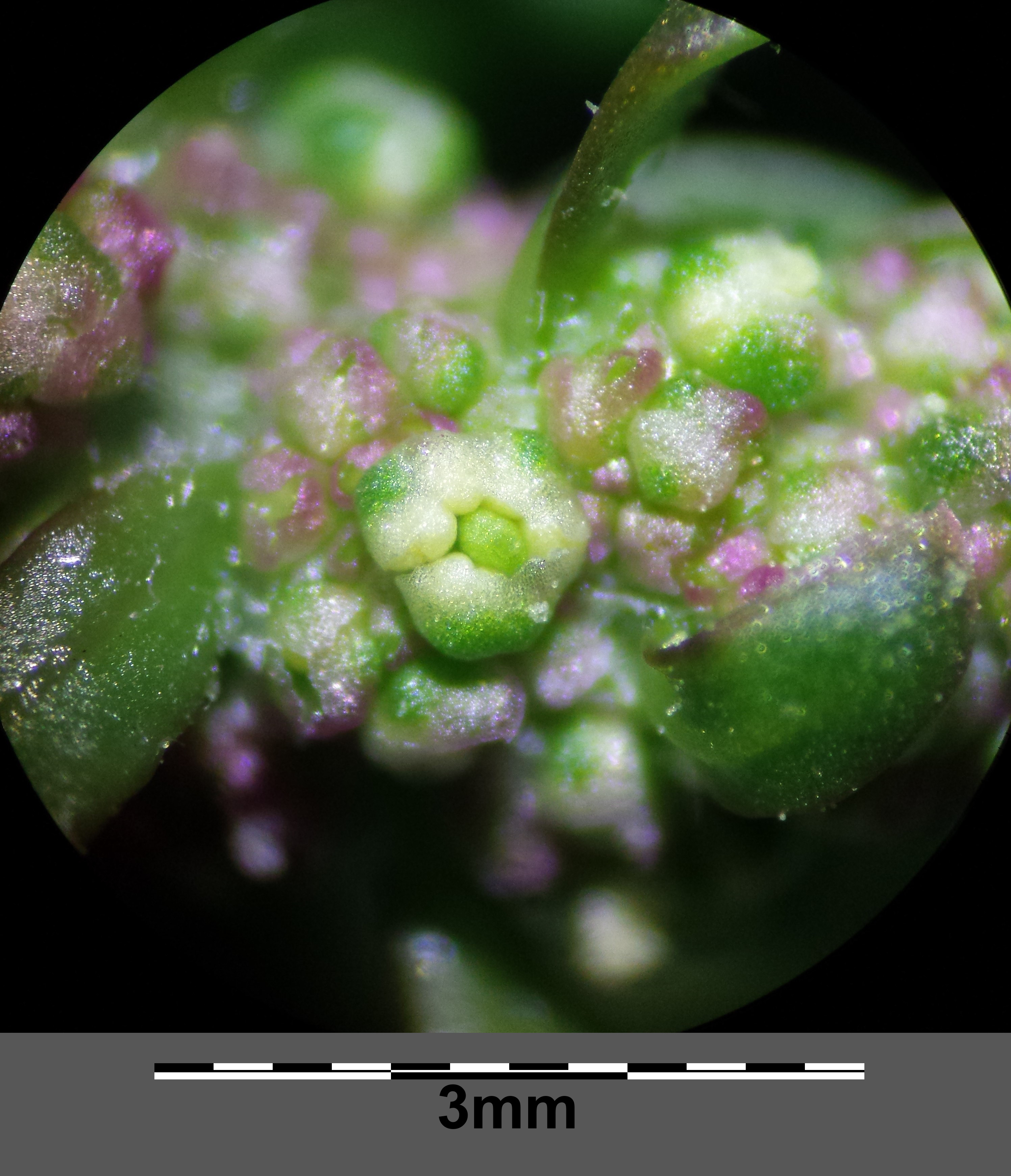
A terminal flower with 5 perianth segments

== Taxonomy ==
The name was coined in 2012, following a study of the phylogeny of the Chenopodioideae.

In America it is sometimes known as coastblite goosefoot

== Habitat and ecology ==
Red goosefoot grows in places where there was standing water during the winter, which dries out to leave bare mud on which the seeds germinate in the spring. It flowers and fruits from summer to early autumn. Its physical requirements are generally quite broad: typically it grows in full sunlight but it can tolerate light shade; although it often starts on wet ground, it often found on parched soils by summer; and in terms of nutrients, it grows on substrates as rich as farmyard dung heaps or as poor as mesotrophic lake margins. It is even tolerant of a wide range of salinity, from freshwater to saltmarsh. The only attribute for which it has a restricted range is pH, as it is not found on either strongly acid or calcareous soils. The Ellenberg-type indicator values it has been assigned in Britain do not reflect this habitat range very well, instead giving neutral values for most attributes: L = 7, F = 7, R = 7, N = 8 and S = 1, but recently recalculated values for Europe give perhaps more realistic scores of L = 8, F = 6, R = 7, N = x, S = 1 and T = 6 ('x' in this context meaning that the plant is not sensitive to that variable).

== Conservation status in the United States ==
It is listed a special concern and believed extirpated in Connecticut. It is listed as endangered in New Jersey, and as threatened in Maine, New Hampshire, and in New York.

== Native American ethnobotany ==
The Goshute Shosone of Utah use the seeds for food. The name of the plant in the Goshute Shoshone language is on'-tǐm-pi-wa-tsǐp, on'-tǐm-pi-wa, on'-tǐm-pi-a-wa or on'-tǐm-pai-wa.
