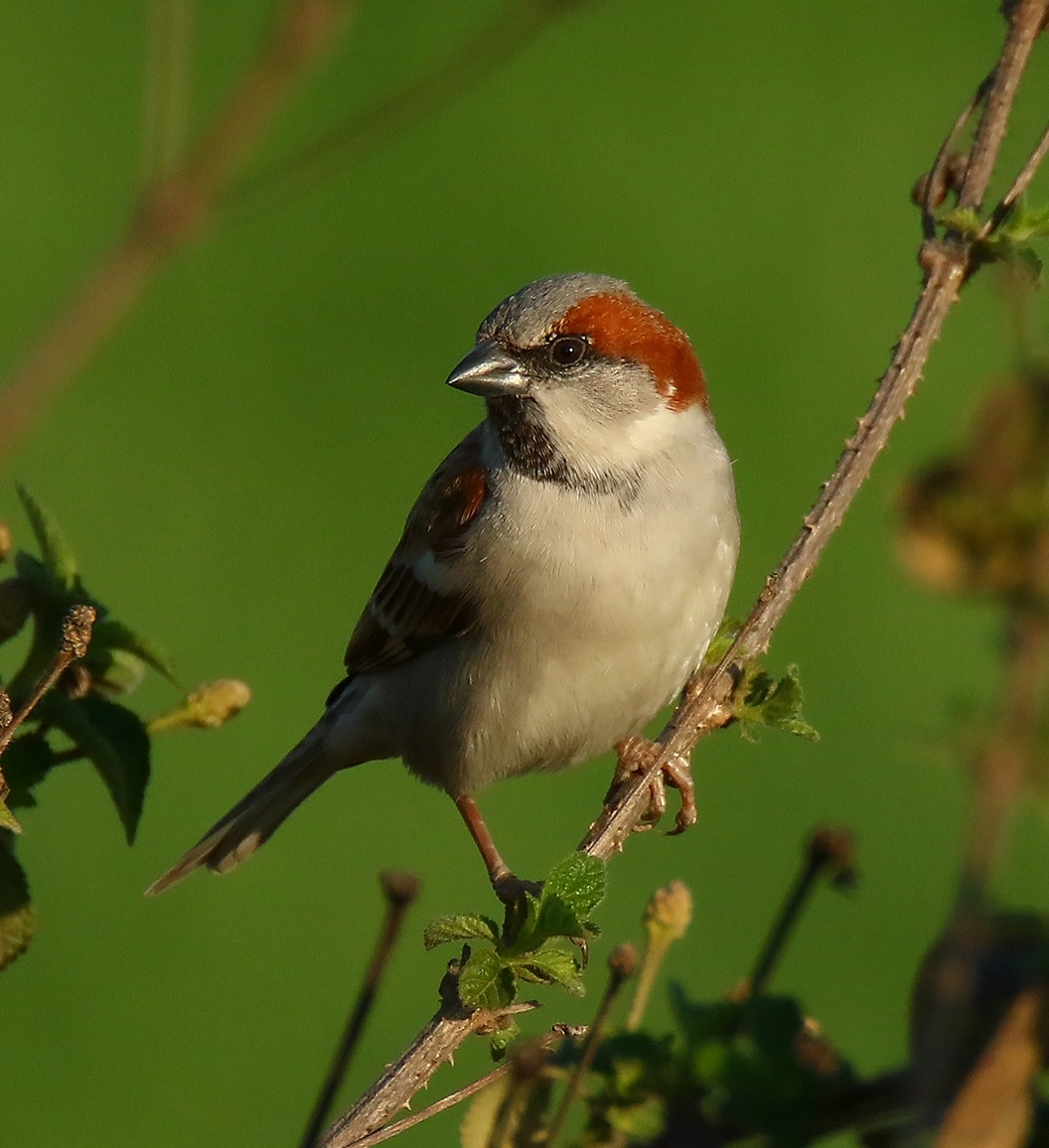
- Male at Head Marala, Punjab, Pakistan

Conservation status
- Least Concern (IUCN 3.1)

Scientific classification
- Kingdom: Animalia
- Phylum: Chordata
- Class: Aves
- Order: Passeriformes
- Family: Passeridae
- Genus: Passer
- Species: P. pyrrhonotus

Binomial name
- Passer pyrrhonotus Blyth, 1845
- Approximate limits of the Sind sparrow's breeding (green) and winter dispersal (sky blue) range, within which it is very local

Audio
- Calls (recorded in Bikaner)

= Sind sparrow =

Species of bird

The Sind sparrow (Passer pyrrhonotus) is a passerine bird of the sparrow family, Passeridae, found around the Indus valley region in South Asia. Its name refers to the province of Sindh, and it is also known as the jungle, Sind jungle, or rufous-backed sparrow. Very similar to the related house sparrow, it is smaller and has distinguishing plumage features. As in the house sparrow, the male has brighter plumage than female and young birds, including black markings and a grey crown. Distinctively, the male has a chestnut stripe running down its head behind the eye, and the female has a darker head than other sparrow species. Its main vocalisations are soft chirping calls that are extended into longer songs with other sounds interspersed by breeding males. Historically, this species was thought to be very closely related to the house sparrow, but its closest evolutionary affinities may lie elsewhere. The species was discovered around 1840, but went undetected for several decades afterwards.

Within its Indus valley breeding range in Pakistan and western India, the Sind sparrow is patchily distributed in riverine and wetland habitats with thorny scrub and tall grass. During the non-breeding season, some birds enter drier habitats as they disperse short distances from their breeding habitat, or migrate into western Pakistan and the extreme east of Iran. Since this species is fairly common and expanding its range, it is assessed as least concern on the IUCN Red List. The Sind sparrow is social while feeding and gathers in small groups both while breeding and during winter dispersal. It feeds mostly on seeds and less often on insects, foraging close to the ground. Nests are made in the branches of thorny trees, and are untidy globular masses constructed from grass or other plant matter and lined with softer material. Both sexes are involved in building the nest and caring for the young, and usually raise two clutches of three to five young each breeding season.

== Description ==
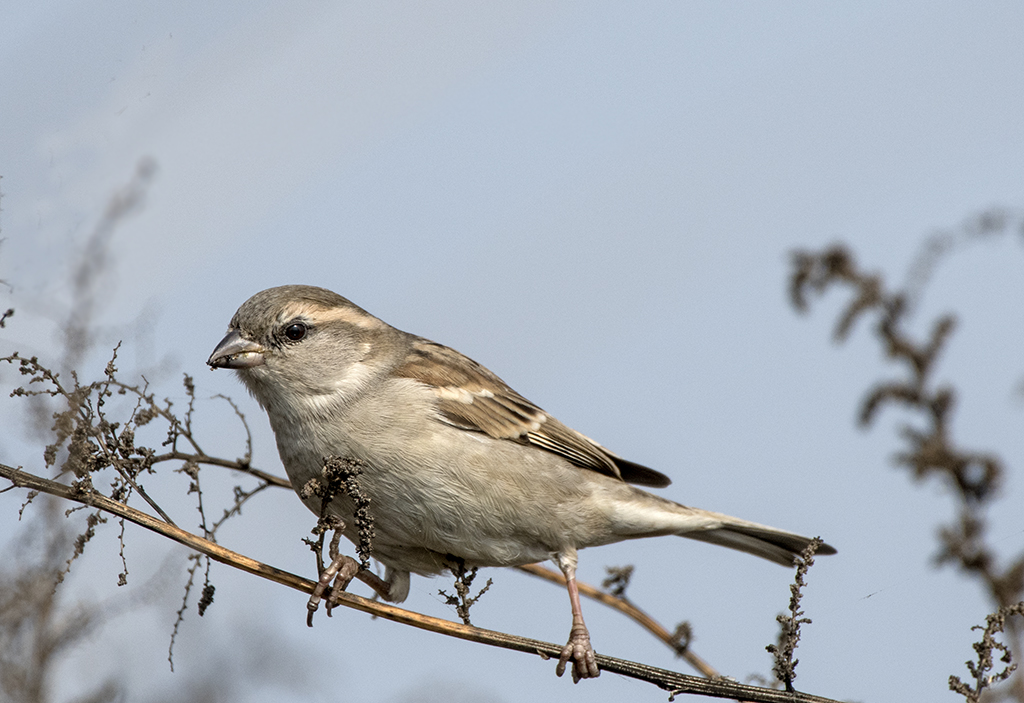
Female in Delhi, India

The Sind sparrow is very similar to the house sparrow, and both sexes resemble their counterparts of that species, but it is slightly smaller and males and females each have features that distinguish them as Sind sparrows. The Sind sparrow is 13 cm (5.1 in) long, while the common South Asian subspecies of the house sparrow, Passer domesticus indicus, is 15 cm (5.9 in) long. Wingspans range from 6.2 to 7.0 cm (2.4 to 2.8 in), tails from 4.7 to 5.7 cm (1.9 to 2.2 in), and tarsi measure 1.6–1.9 centimetres (0.63–0.75 in).

The breeding male has a short and narrow black bib and a broad chestnut eye stripe that does not meet the mantle. The male has a grey crown and nape and a rufous lower back and rump. The female has a darker and greyer crown and cheek than the female house sparrow and the shoulder is darker chestnut. The female Dead Sea sparrow of the subspecies Passer moabiticus yattii is also similar to the female Sind sparrow, but has yellow tinges on the underparts and sometimes on parts of the head. The bill is black on the breeding male and pale brown on the non-breeding male and female. With a culmen length of 1.1–1.3 centimetres (0.43–0.51 in), the Sind sparrow is slightly smaller-billed than the house sparrow.

The Sind sparrow's chirping chup call is softer, less strident, and higher pitched than that of the house sparrow, and is easily distinguished. The song of breeding males includes chirrups interspersed with grating t-r-r-rt notes and short warbles or whistles.

== Taxonomy ==
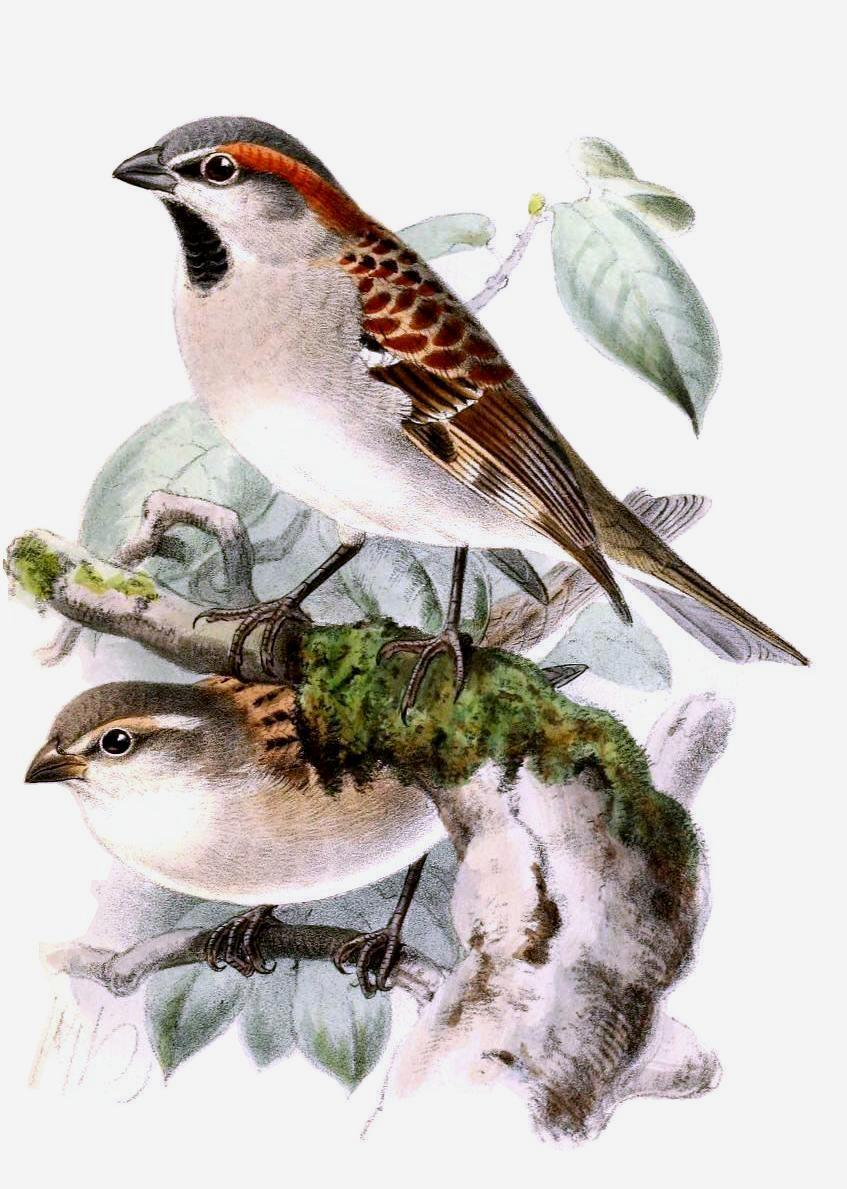
Illustration of a pair by John Gerrard Keulemans, 1888

The Sind sparrow was first formally described by Edward Blyth, from a specimen collected by Alexander Burnes at Bahawalpur in around 1840. Blyth's description was published in an issue of the Journal of the Asiatic Society of Bengal which, although dated 1844, was published only in 1845. The sparrow was not recorded until 36 years later, despite the efforts of noted ornithologists Allan Octavian Hume in Sindh and William Thomas Blanford in eastern Iran. This was probably because of its general similarity to the house sparrow, though additionally, Blyth's description of the species incorrectly described its rump feathers as maroon, and a description by Thomas C. Jerdon contained similar errors. Commenting on his unsuccessful search, Hume wrote that the hundreds of house sparrows he killed in pursuit of the Sind sparrow "ought to form a heavy load" on Blyth's conscience, and that if the Sind sparrow existed "it would be only decent for it ... to put on an appearance with as little delay as possible". Hume doubted its distinction, as did other ornithologists. The Sind sparrow was rediscovered by Scrope Berdmore Doig in 1880, in the Eastern Nara district. Ernst Hartert considered it a subspecies of the house sparrow, Passer domesticus pyrrhonotus, in his Die Vögel der paläarktishen Fauna, but Doig and Claud Ticehurst both found that the two species bred in the same areas without interbreeding.

The specific epithet of the Sind sparrow, pyrrhonotus, comes from the Greek purrhos ("flame-coloured"), and -nōtos ("-backed"). E. C. Stuart Baker suggested the English name rufous-backed sparrow, but as this name might cause confusion with other species, Ticehurst suggested the name Sind jungle-sparrow, which became the accepted name for the species. This name refers to Sindh, a province now in Pakistan which makes up a large part of the Sind sparrow's range, and the jungle habitat of the bird (in the word's original sense of tangled dry thicket). This name is shortened to jungle sparrow or Sind sparrow, of which the first was used in the IOC World Bird List, until Sind sparrow was adopted in 2009.

The Sind sparrow is a member of the genus Passer, which contains the house sparrow and around twenty other species. In a 1936 review of the house sparrow's relatives, German ornithologist Wilhelm Meise suggested that the Sind sparrow evolved from an isolated population of house sparrows, noting that the Indus valley is a centre of small bird types.

British ornithologist J. Denis Summers-Smith considered the Sind sparrow to be part of the "Palaearctic black-bibbed sparrow" group including the house sparrow, though not one with a particularly close relationship with the house sparrow. Summer-Smith suggested that these species separated 25,000 to 15,000 years ago, during the last glacial period, when sparrows would have been isolated in ice-free refugia, such as the Indus River Delta, where he thought the Sind sparrow evolved. However, studies of mitochondrial DNA and nuclear DNA genes indicate an earlier origin of Passer species, with speciation occurring as early as the late Miocene and early Pliocene, about 5 million years ago. The chestnut sparrow, russet sparrow and saxaul sparrow, which were also considered to be members of the "Palaearctic black-bibbed sparrow" group, are not phylogenetically closely related with the house sparrow. But there is more or less conflict between the two studies (and between different analyses), some clades are not highly supported, and the Sind sparrow was not included, so the evolutionary history of Sind sparrow and its relationship to other sparrow species remain unclear.

Hume and Ticehurst observed a resemblance, and a possible relation, between the Sind sparrow and the Dead Sea sparrow of the Middle East and Balochistan. William Robert Ogilvie-Grant and Henry Ogg Forbes saw a resemblance to the Abd al-Kuri sparrow, endemic to the island of Abd al-Kuri, in their 1899 description of that species, noted upon by Guy M. Kirwan in a 2008 study.

== Distribution and habitat ==
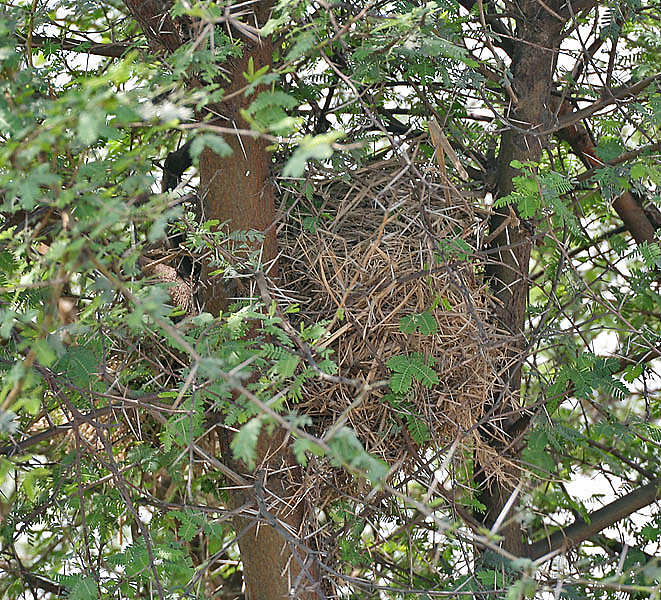
Nest at Sultanpur National Park in India

The Sind sparrow has a restricted distribution, primarily occurring within the Indus valley of Pakistan, and the lower parts of the tributaries of the Indus in the Punjab region. Its distribution extends from the Indus Delta north to the Kabul River near Nowshera and the Jhelum near Nurpur Noon, extending east into India as far as the Delhi area. It also breeds locally in parts of Pakistan's western province of Balochistan, and has been recorded several times in south-eastern Iran. The Sind sparrow is somewhat common in its restricted breeding range, and no threats are known to the survival of the species, so it is assessed as least concern on the IUCN Red List.

During winter, it often makes short-distance movements, and some birds move into parts of western Pakistan and an adjoining corner of Iran, and less commonly north-western Gujarat, India. Longer movements may occur, as suggested by a possible sighting in the United Arab Emirates in November 2000.

It mostly breeds in acacia and tamarisk scrub and tall grass, invariably near rivers or other wetlands. The construction and expansion of irrigation canals has increased its habitat in Sindh, and helped it extend its range into the Yamuna floodplain and parts of Rajasthan, India. It may breed around rice paddies and other fields, or human habitations, provided that there is enough cover and suitable nesting sites. In winter, it moves away from its main riverine habitat, and into drier thickets characterised by Salvadora and Capparis bushes, but never moves too far from water.

== Behaviour ==
The Sind sparrow is gregarious, generally forming small groups of four to six birds while feeding. It tends to breed in loose colonies of a few pairs, and non-breeding birds may gather to roost in acacias or tamarisks near water. During winter, the non-breeding season, it forms larger flocks of as many as 30 birds, and joins flocks with other seed-eating birds, such as house sparrows and red avadavats. The Sind sparrow feeds mainly on the seeds of grasses and other plants such as Polygonum plebeium. It may also forage for insects such as caterpillars, especially to feed nestlings. Flocks forage on flats alongside rivers, flying into nearby bushes and continuing to forage when disturbed.

Nesting occurs during a period of several months between April and September, the timing depending on rainfall, during which two clutches are raised by most pairs. Sind sparrows build nests in the upper branches of thorny trees or the ends of thin branches hanging over water. The nest is an untidy dome of grass and other plant matter, such as tamarisk twigs, roots, and reeds, with a diameter of about 9 to 18 cm (3.5 to 7.1 in). The nest has an entrance located higher up on the sides, is somewhat flat on top, and is lined with softer plant material and feathers. The birds may sometimes build below the nests of egrets or extend the nest of a baya weaver or Indian pied myna. Both the male and female take part in nest building and incubation. Clutches typically contain three to five eggs. Scrope Doig described the eggs as being markedly smaller than the house sparrow's, measuring 0.7 × 0.5 in (1.3 × 1.8 cm) and similarly greenish or greyish with highly variable blotches, striations, and other markings.
