= Passer predomesticus =

Passer predomesticus Temporal range: Middle Pleistocene

Scientific classification
- Kingdom: Animalia
- Phylum: Chordata
- Class: Aves
- Order: Passeriformes
- Family: Passeridae
- Genus: Passer
- Species: P. predomesticus

Binomial name
- Passer predomesticus Tchernov, 1962

Extinct species of bird

Passer predomesticus is a fossil passerine bird in the sparrow family Passeridae. First described in 1962, it is known from two premaxillary (upper jaw) bones found in a Middle Pleistocene layer of the Oumm-Qatafa cave in Palestine. The premaxillaries resemble those of the house and Spanish sparrows, but differ in having a deep groove instead of a crest on the lower side. Israeli palaeontologist Eitan Tchernov, who described the species, and others have considered it to be close to the ancestor of the house and Spanish sparrows, but molecular data point to an earlier origin of modern sparrow species. Occurring in a climate Tchernov described as similar to but rainier than that in Palestine today, it was considered by Tchernov as a "wild" ancestor of the modern sparrows which have a commensal association with humans, although its presence in Oumm-Qatafa cave may indicate that it was associated with humans.

== Taxonomy ==
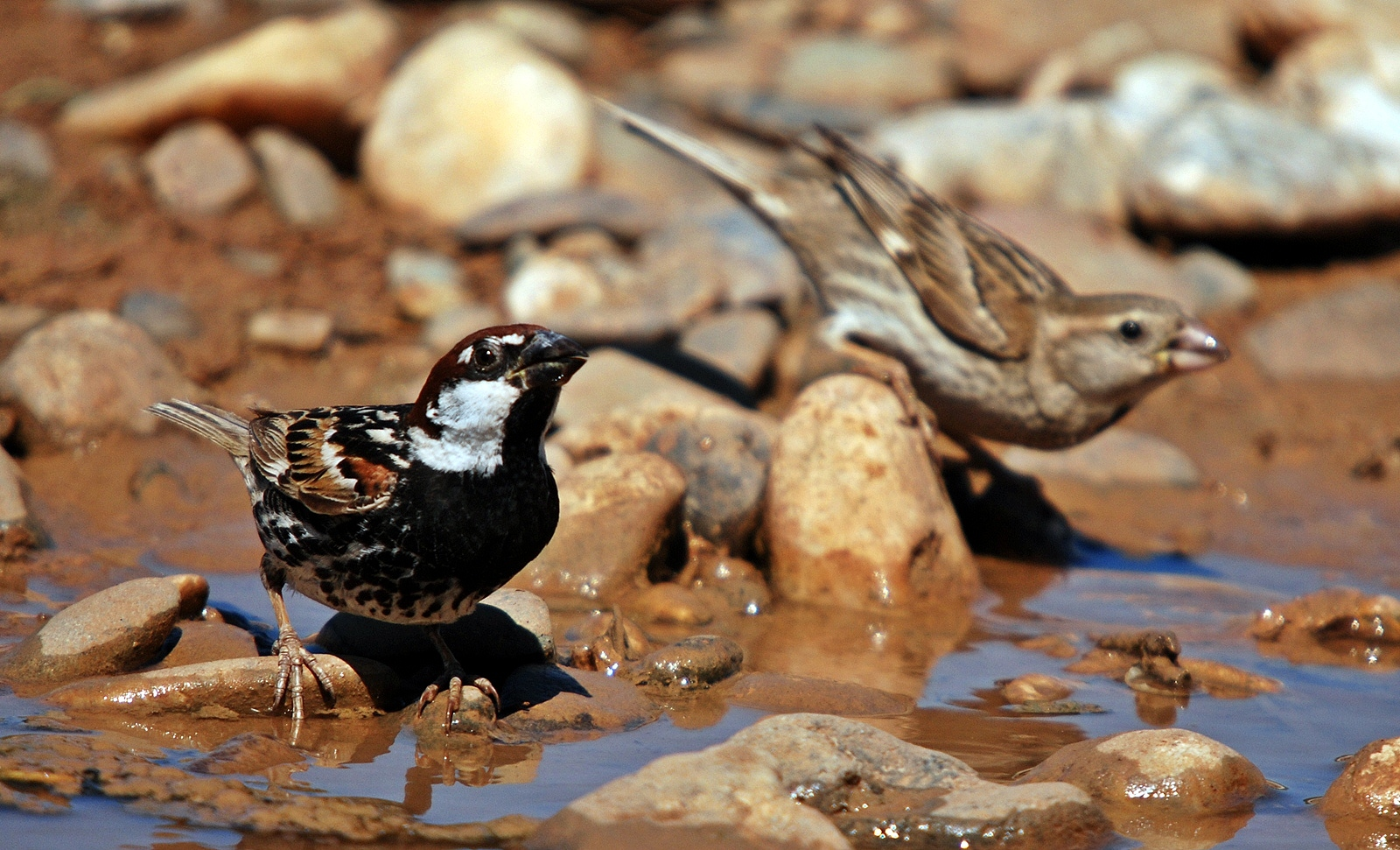
A male and female of the Spanish sparrow, a close relative of P. predomesticus, in southeastern Turkey

The known material of Passer predomesticus consists of two premaxillary bones in the collections of the Hebrew University of Jerusalem. The bones were described by Israeli palaeontologist Eitan Tchernov in 1962 and reviewed by South African zoologist Miles Markus two years later. Tchernov did not unambiguously identify a type specimen and his paper was said by Robert M. Mengel, the editor of The Auk, to contain "many troublesome lapses and contradictions". In 1975, French palaeontologist Cécile Mourer-Chauviré reported on fossil sparrows from a cave at Saint-Estève-Janson in southeastern France, which could not be identified as either P. predomesticus or the house sparrow (Passer domesticus). Because no premaxillae were found, the bones could not be distinguished from those of the house sparrow.

Tchernov argued that the house sparrow and related species have undergone considerable morphological changes in adapting to a commensal relationship with humans, with the beak becoming longer and narrower. He wrote that P. predomesticus was intermediate between the house sparrow and Spanish sparrow (Passer hispaniolensis), and suggested that it may be a primitive relative of the ancestor of the house sparrow that did not become dependent on humans. In a 1984 paper, Tchernov suggested that the period in which the house sparrow and P. predomesticus could have separated was the Würm glaciation 70,000–10,000 years ago. Markus found that the fossil species was closest to living house sparrows from Palestine and to the great sparrow (P. motitensis), and proposed that the house sparrow evolved in Africa. In a 1977 account of the evolution of the house sparrow, American zoologists Richard F. Johnston and William J. Klitz considered that the house sparrow evolved with the beginning of agriculture, dating any fossils that could even be assigned to the common ancestor of the house and Spanish sparrows as more recent than P. predomesticus. In his 1988 work The Sparrows, British ornithologist J. Denis Summers-Smith considered that P. predomesticus was roughly contemporary with the common ancestor of the house and Spanish sparrows and that all present-day Palaearctic Passer species evolved later. Drawing on more recent studies of molecular data, Ted R. Anderson stated in his 2006 Biology of the Ubiquitous House Sparrow that all Passer species have a long evolutionary history, with speciation possibly occurring as early as the Miocene.

== Description ==
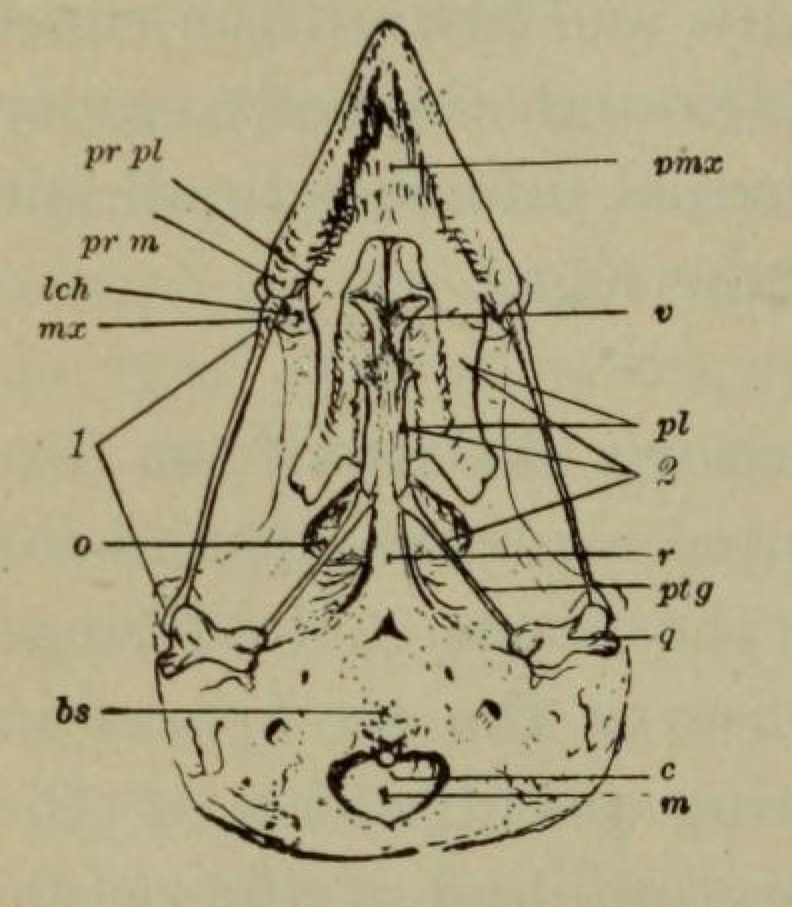
Diagram of the skull of a house sparrow seen from below, with the premaxilla (marked pmx) at top

Premaxillae, the only bones from which Passer predomesticus is known, are generally relatively easy to identify to species in birds. Tchernov found that the two premaxillae of P. predomesticus most closely resembled the house and Spanish sparrows, but were distinct from either. In P. predomesticus, there is a central, longitudinal groove with raised margins running along the lower (ventral) side of the premaxilla. In contrast, the house and Spanish sparrows have a narrow crest in this position, which is more prominent in the house sparrow. In the great sparrow, Cape sparrow (Passer melanurus), and southern grey-headed sparrow (Passer diffusus), this crest is more poorly developed, and they may even have a shallow groove at the front of the premaxilla, not nearly as well-developed as the groove in P. predomesticus. In P. predomesticus, the premaxilla has a maximum width of 8.0 millimetres (0.31 in) and the length from the tip of the premaxilla to the back of the nasal bones is 12.0 millimetres (0.47 in).

== Distribution ==
According to Tchernov's 1962 paper, Passer predomesticus was found in the middle Acheulean (middle Pleistocene, probably more than 400,000 years old) layer E1 of the Oumm-Qatafa cave in Wadi Khareitoun near Bethlehem. In 1984, however, Tchernov wrote that P. predomesticus was about 140,000 years old, from the Yabrudian. Layer E1 contained remains of about 40 bird species, including a premaxilla Tchernov described as a precursor of the Dead Sea sparrow (Passer moabiticus) and a tarsometatarsus and humerus tentatively allied with the house sparrow. An undetermined Acheulean layer of the same cave also contained fossils Tchernov described as precursors of both the house and Spanish sparrows.

Although interpretations of the palaeoclimate at Oumm-Qatafa have differed, Tchernov suggested that the deposits are from a Mediterranean climate, although one rainier than that today. Tchernov considered P. predomesticus a "wild" sparrow, but Anderson considered that the occurrence of P. predomesticus and the other Passer fossils in Oumm-Qatafa indicates that these species lived in association with early Palaeolithic humans.
