= 1962 in paleontology =

Paleontology or palaeontology is the study of prehistoric life forms on Earth through the examination of plant and animal fossils. This includes the study of body fossils, tracks (ichnites), burrows, cast-off parts, fossilised feces (coprolites), palynomorphs and chemical residues. Because humans have encountered fossils for millennia, paleontology has a long history both before and after becoming formalized as a science. This article records significant discoveries and events related to paleontology that occurred or were published in the year 1962.

== Paleozoology ==
=== Conodont paleozoology ===
German paleontologist Klaus J. Müller (1923–2010) described the conodont order Paraconodontida.

Name	Status	Authors	Age	Unit	Location	Notes	Images
Histiodella	Valid taxon	RW Harris	Middle Ordovician	Arbuckle Mountains, Oklahoma, USA	Canada (Northwest Territories); China; Russia		

== Vertebrates ==
=== Dinosaurs ===
==== Newly named dinosaurs ====
Data courtesy of George Olshevsky's dinosaur genera list.

Name	Status	Authors		Age	Unit	Location	Notes	Images
Heterodontosaurus	Valid taxon	Alfred W. Crompton	Alan Charig	Early Jurassic (Hettangian-Sinemurian)	Upper Elliot Formation	South Africa	A heterodontosaurid.	Heterodontosaurus

=== Birds ===
==== Newly named birds ====
Name	Novelty	Status	Authors	Age	Unit	Location	Notes	Images
Anas ogallalae	Sp. nov.	valid	Brodkorb	Early Pliocene	Ogallala Formation	USA (California)	An Anatidae, first described as Nettion ogallalae Brodkorb, 1962.	
Corvus betfianus	Sp. nov.	valid	Kretzoi	Early Pleistocene	Betfia 5	Romania	A Corvidae.	
Diomedea californica	Sp. nov.	valid	Miller	Middle Miocene	Temblor Formation	USA (California)	A Diomedeidae, perhaps better placed in Phoebastria Reichenbach, 1853.	
Passer predomesticus	Sp. nov.	valid	Tchernov	Middle Pleistocene	Acheulian	Israel	A Passeridae.	
Pelargosteon tothi	Gen. nov. et Sp. nov.	valid	Kretzoi	Early Pleistocene	Betfia 5	Romania	An Aves ''Incertae Sedis'', described in the Ciconiidae.	
Perdix jurcsaki	Sp. nov.	valid	Kretzoi	Early Pleistocene	Betfia 5	Romania	A Phasiandae.	
Tetrao partium	Sp. nov.	valid	Kretzoi	Early Pleistocene	Betfia 5	Romania	A Phasiandae, a synonym is Lyrurus partium Kretzoi, 1962.	
Turdicus tenuis	Gen. nov. et Sp. nov.	valid	Kretzoi	Early Pleistocene	Betfia 5	Romania	A Turdidae.	
