= 1980 in paleontology =

Paleontology or palaeontology is the study of prehistoric life forms on Earth through the examination of plant and animal fossils. This includes the study of body fossils, tracks (ichnites), burrows, cast-off parts, fossilised feces (coprolites), palynomorphs and chemical residues. Because humans have encountered fossils for millennia, paleontology has a long history both before and after becoming formalized as a science. This article records significant discoveries and events related to paleontology that occurred or were published in the year 1980.

== Bryophytes ==
Name	Novelty	Status	Authors	Age	Type locality	Location	Notes	Images
Hypnites jovetasti	Comb nov	Valid	(Kuc) Miller	Ypresian	Allenby Formation	Canada; British Columbia	An amblystegiaceous moss moved from Palaeohypnum jovet-asti 1974	
Hypnites steerei	Comb nov	Valid	(Kuc) Miller	Ypresian	Allenby Formation	Canada; British Columbia	An amblystegiaceous moss moved from Palaeohypnum steerei 1974	
Plagiopodopsis eocenicus	Comb nov	Valid	(Kuc) Miller	Ypresian	Allenby Formation	Canada; British Columbia	A bartramiaceous moss moved from Muscites eocenicus 1972	

== Arthropods ==
=== Insects ===
Name	Novelty	Status	Authors	Age	Unit	Location	Notes	Images
Anochetus corayi	Sp nov	Valid	Baroni Urbani	Burdigalian	Dominican amber	Dominican Republic	A ponerin ant	Anochetus corayi
Trachymyrmex primaevus	Sp nov	Valid	Baroni Urbani	Burdigalian	Dominican amber	Dominican Republic	A Myrmicin ant	Trachymyrmex primaevus

== Molluscs ==
=== Newly named bivalves ===
Name	Novelty	Status	Authors	Age	Unit	Location	Notes	Images
Pojetaia	Gen et sp nov	Valid	Jell	Early Cambrian	Parara Limestone	Australia	early Cambrian bivalve, type species P. runnegari	

== Archosauromorphs ==
=== Newly named dinosaurs ===
Data courtesy of George Olshevsky's dinosaur genera list.

Note: the name Lancangosaurus is mistakenly treated as a nomen nudum synonymous with Datousaurus (because Dong et al. 1983 believed it to be conspecific with Datousaurus). However, it is actually an early spelling variant of another nomen nudum, Lancangjiangosaurus.

Name	Novelty	Status	Authors	Age	Unit	Location	Notes	Images
Callovosaurus	Gen et sp nov	valid	Galton	Callovian	Oxford Clay Formation	England	A dryosaurid, That its name means Reptile of Callovian.	
Dracopelta	Gen et sp nov	Valid	Galton	Kimmeridgian		Portugal	A Primitive ankylosaurian	
Erlikosaurus	Gen et sp nov	Valid	Perle	Cenomanian-Santonian	Bayan Shireh Formation	Mongolia	A therizinosaurid	Erlikosaurus
Kakuru	Gen et sp nov	Valid	Molnar & Pledge	Aptian	Marree Formation	Australia	A Theropoda of uncertain phylogenetic classification.	
Minmi	Gen et sp nov	Valid	Molnar	Aptian	Bungil Formation	Australia	An Australian ankylosaurid	Minmi
Noasaurus	Gen et sp nov	Valid	Bonaparte & Powell	Campanian-Maastrichtian	Lecho Formation	Argentina	A Noasaurid	Noasaurus
Saltasaurus	Gen et sp nov	Valid	Bonaparte & Powell	Campanian-Maastrichtian	Lecho Formation	Argentina	A Saltasaurid, a Sauropod with Ankylosaur-like armor	Saltasaurus
Zephyrosaurus	Gen et sp nov	Valid	Sues	Aptian-Albian	Cloverly Formation	USA (Montana Maryland Virginia	A thescelosaurid	

=== Newly named birds ===
Name	Novelty	Status	Authors	Age	Unit	Location	Notes	Images
Alectoris baryosefi	Sp. nov.	Valid	Eitan Tchernov	Pleistocene	MQ 1b	Israel	A Phasianidae.	
Anser thompsoni	Sp. nov.	Valid	Larry D. Martin Robert M. Mengel	Late Pliocene	Blancan Broadwater Formation	USA: Nebraska	An Anatidae.	
Apopempsis africanus	Sp. nov.	Valid	Colin J. O. Harrison	Early Miocene	Songhor	Kenya	A Musophagidae, transferred to the genus Veflintornis Kashin, 1976, Apopempsis Brodkorb, 1971 preoccupied by Apopempsis Schenkling, 1903.	
Archaeotrogon hoffstetteri	Sp. nov.	Valid	Cécile Mourer-Chauviré	Eocene or Oligocene	Phosphorites du Quercy MP 16-28	France	An Apodiformes, Archaeotrogonidae Mourer-Chauviré, 1980.	
Ardea howardae	Sp. nov.	Valid	Pierce Brodkorb	Late Pliocene	Shungura Formation, 1.94 My BP	Ethiopia	An Ardeidae.	
Argentavis magnificens	Gen. nov. et Sp. nov.	Valid	Kenneth E. Campbell, jr. Eduado P. Tonni	Late Miocene	Salinas Grandes de Hidalgo	Argentina	A Teratornithidae Miller, 1909, this is the type species of the new genus.	Argentavis
Burhinus aquilonaris	Sp. nov.	Valid	Alan Feduccia	Pleistocene	Sanborn Formation	USA: Kansas	A Burhinidae.	
Ciconia minor	Sp. nov.	Valid	Colin J. O. Harrison	Early Miocene	Rusinga Island	Kenya	A Ciconiidae.	
Crex zazhigini	Sp. nov.	Valid	Evgeny N. Kurochkin	Early Pliocene	MN 14-15	Mongolia	A Rallidae, transferred to the genus Pastushkinia Zelenkov, 2013 as its type species.	
Eostrix vincenti	Sp. nov.	Valid	Colin J. O. Harrison	Early Eocene	Ypresian, MP 7-10	UK: England	A Strigiformes, Strigida, Protostrigidae Wetmore, 1933.	
Gallinula gigantea	Sp. nov.	Valid	Eitan Tchernov	Pleistocene		Israel	A Rallidae.	
Juncitarsus gracillimus	Gen. nov. et Sp. nov.	Valid	Storrs L. Olson Alan Feduccia	Early Middle Eocene	Bridger Formation	USA: Wyoming	A Phoenicopteriformes Fürbringer, 1888, Juncitarsidae Peters, 1987, this is the type species of the new genus.	
Larus dolnicensis	Sp. nov.	Valid	Petr Švec	Early Miocene	MN 4b	Czechoslovakia	Described as a Laridae, transferred to the Glareolidae, genus Mioglareola Ballmann, 1979 by Mlíkovský, 2000.	
Linquornis gigantis	Gen. nov. et Sp. nov.	Valid	Yeh Hsiang-k'uei	Middle Miocene	Shanwang Series	China	A Phasianidae, this is the type species of the new genus.	
Milvus pygmeus	Sp. nov.	Valid	Eitan Tchernov	Pleistocene		Israel	An Accipitridae.	
Neophrontops ricardoensis	Sp. nov.	Valid	Patricia Vickers Rich	Middle Miocene	Late Claredonian	USA; California	An Accipitridae.	
Palaeoaramides tugarinovi	Sp. nov.	Valid	Evgeny N. Kurochkin	Miocene-Middle Pliocene	Chirgis Nuur series	Mongolia	A Rallidae.	
Rallus risillus	Sp. nov.	Valid	Evgeny N. Kurochkin	Miocene-Middle Pliocene	Chirgis Nuur series	Mongolia	A Rallidae, transferred to the genus Porzana by Kurochkin, 1985.	
Sinanas diatomas	Gen. nov. et Sp. nov.	Valid	Yeh Hsiang-k'uei	Middle Miocene	Shanwang bed sw2	China	An Anatidae, this is the type species of the new genus.	
Sylviornis neocaledoniae	Gen. nov. et Sp. nov.	Valid	François Poplin	Holocene	Cave deposits	New Caledonia	Described as a Ratitae, transferred to the Craciformes, Megapodiidae and placed in its own family Sylviornithidae by Mourer-Chauviré & Balouet, 2005, this is the type species of the new genus.	
Tonsala hildegardae	Gen. nov. et Sp. nov.	Valid	Storrs L. Olson	Late Oligocene	Pysht Formation	USA: Washington	A Pelecaniformes, Plotopteridae Howard, 1969, this is the type species of the new genus.	
Tyto balearica	Sp. nov.	Valid	Cécile Mourer-Chauviré Josep A. Alcover Salvador Moya Juan Pons	Late Miocene-Pleistocene	MN 12-MN 18, MQ 2A-C	Spain; Italy; France; Majorca; Sardinia	A Tytonidae.	
Zhongyuanus xichuanensis	Gen. nov. et Sp. nov.	Valid	Hou Lainhai	Early Eocene	Yuhuangding Group	China	A Gastornithidae Fürbringer, 1888, transferred to the genus Gastornis Hébert, 1855 by Buffetaut, 2013., this is the type species of the new genus.	

== Pterosauria ==
=== Newly named pterosaurs ===
Name	Novelty	Status	Authors	Age	Unit	Location	Notes	Images
Santanadactylus	Gen et sp nov	Valid	de Buisonjé	Aptian	Santana Formation	Brazil	A Pterodactyloid	

== Lepidosauromorphs ==
=== Plesiosaurs ===
- Plesiosaur gastroliths documented.

Name	Status	Authors	Age	Location	Notes
Bishanopliosaurus	Valid	Dong	172 million years	China	
