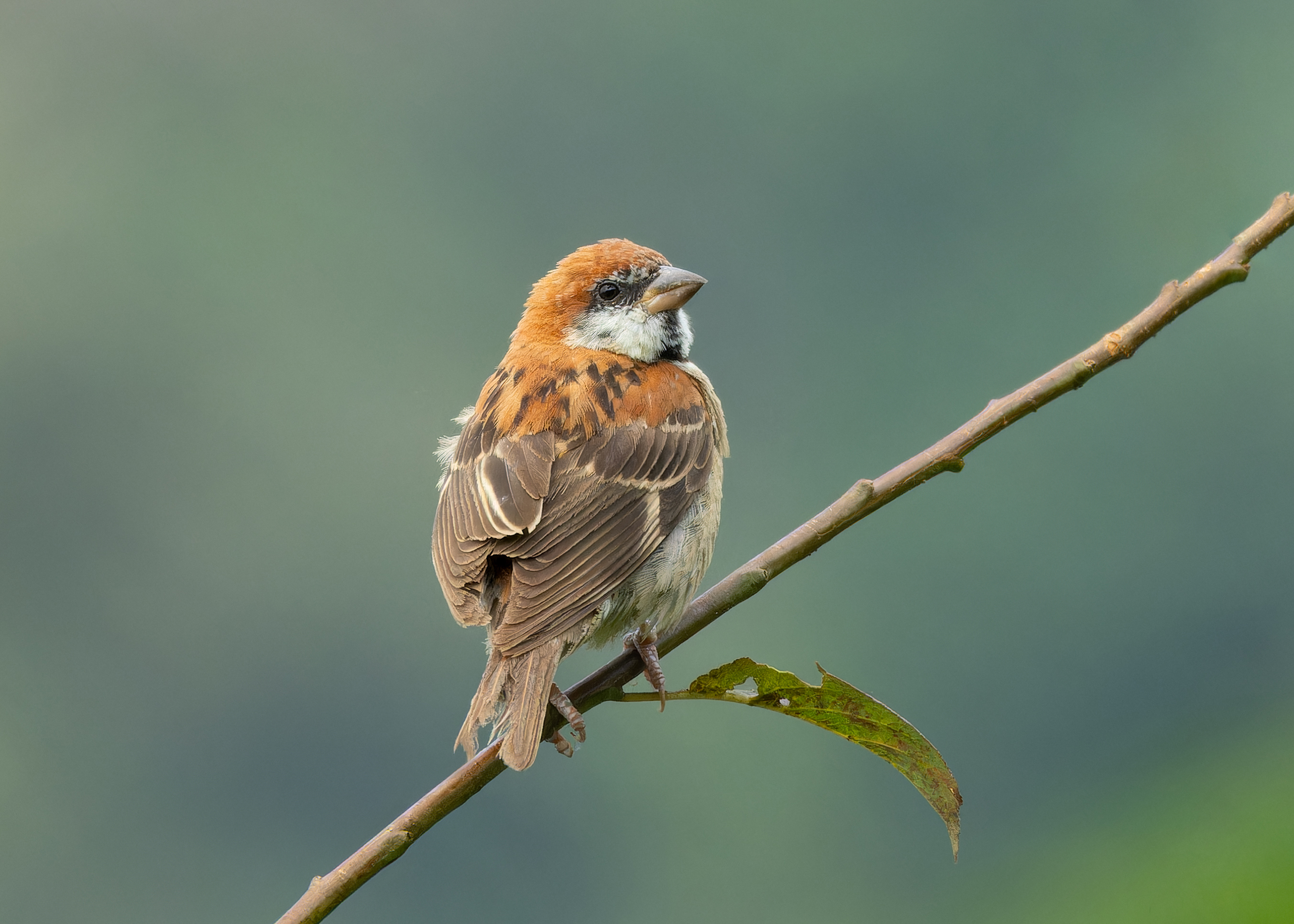
- Male in Sillery Gaon, West Bengal, India
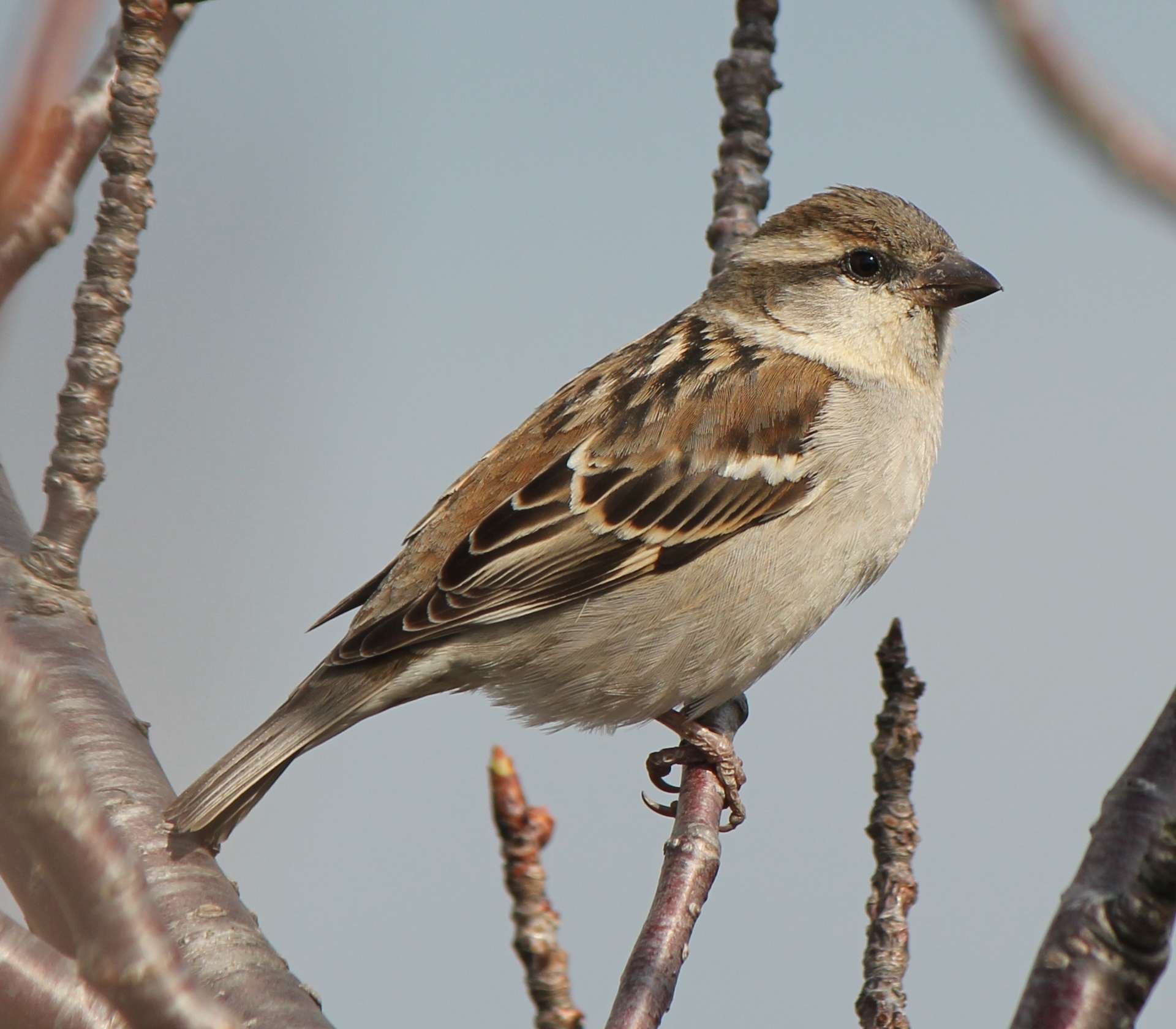
- Female in Aichi Prefecture, Japan

Conservation status
- Least Concern (IUCN 3.1)

Scientific classification
- Kingdom: Animalia
- Phylum: Chordata
- Class: Aves
- Order: Passeriformes
- Family: Passeridae
- Genus: Passer
- Species: P. cinnamomeus

Binomial name
- Passer cinnamomeus (Gould, 1836)
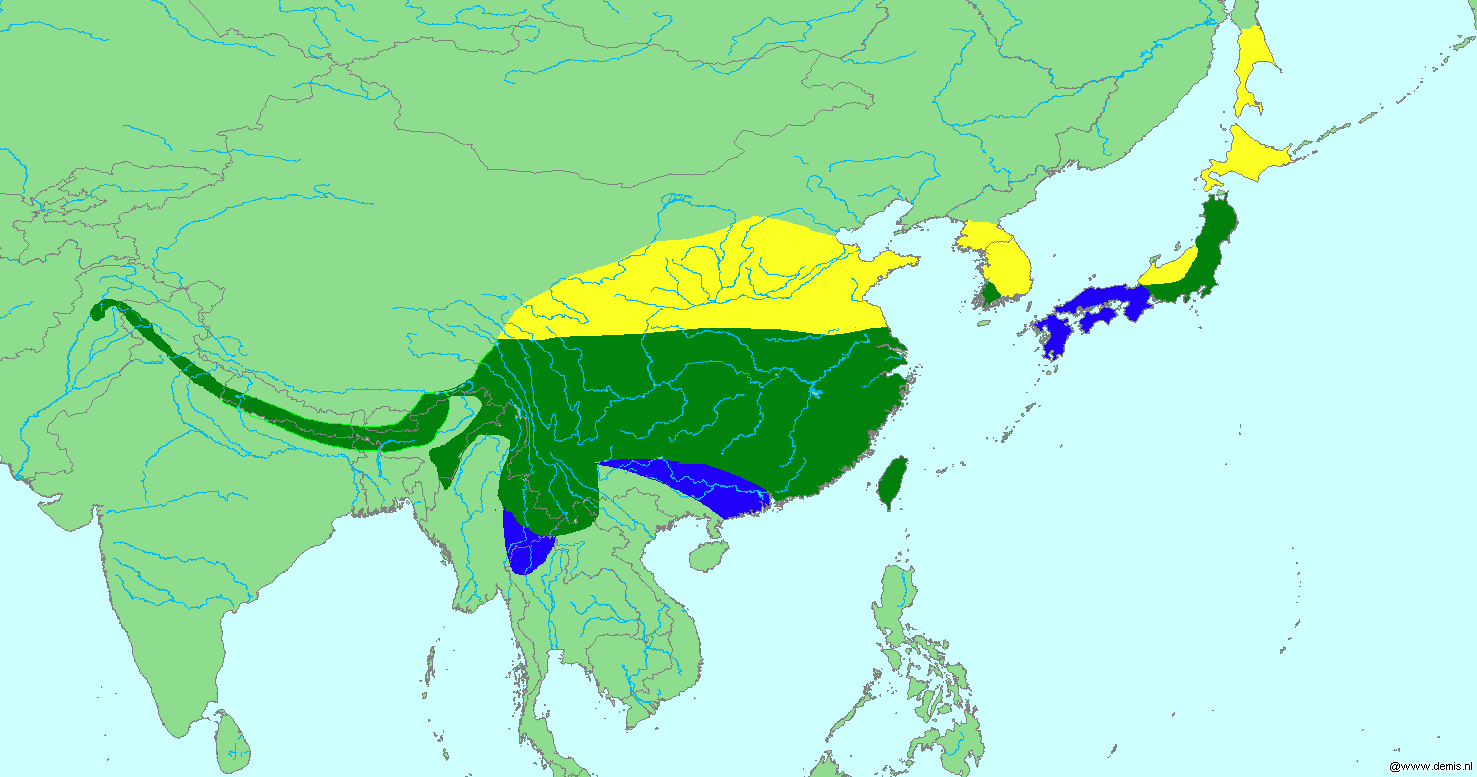
- Distribution of russet sparrow: Summer range Winter range Year-round range

Synonyms
- List: Fringilla rutilans Temminck, 1836; Pyrgita cinnamomea Gould, 1836; Passer rutilans Temminck, 1836; Passer russatus Temminck and Schegel, 1850

= Russet sparrow =

Species of bird

The russet sparrow (Passer cinnamomeus), also called the cinnamon or cinnamon tree sparrow, is a passerine bird of the sparrow family Passeridae. A chunky little seed-eating bird with a thick bill, it has a body length of 14 to 15 cm (5.5–5.9 in). Its plumage is mainly warm rufous above and grey below. It exhibits sexual dimorphism, with the plumage of both sexes patterned similarly to that of the corresponding sex of house sparrow. Its vocalisations are sweet and musical chirps, which when strung together form a song.

Three subspecies are recognised, differing chiefly in the yellowness of their underparts. The subspecies rutilans and intensior breed in parts of eastern Asia, where they are usually found in light woodland, and the subspecies cinnamomeus breeds in the Himalayas, where it is usually associated with terrace cultivation. The russet sparrow is the typical sparrow of human habitations in towns where the house and tree sparrows are absent. In the southern part of its range, the russet sparrow prefers higher altitudes, but in the north it breeds by the sea. The russet sparrow is known well enough in the Himalayas to have a distinct name in some languages, and is depicted in Japanese art.

This sparrow feeds mainly on the seeds of herbs and grains, but it also eats berries and insects, particularly during the breeding season. This diet makes it a minor pest in agricultural areas, but also a predator of insect pests. While breeding, it is not social, as its nests are dispersed. It forms flocks when not breeding, although it associates with other bird species infrequently. In some parts of its range, the russet sparrow migrates, at least to lower altitudes. Its nest is located in a tree cavity, or a hole in a cliff or building. The male chooses the nest site before finding a mate and uses the nest for courtship display. The typical clutch contains five or six whitish eggs. Both sexes incubate and feed the young.

== Taxonomy ==
The English ornithologist John Gould described a specimen of the russet sparrow collected in the Himalayas at a meeting of the Zoological Society of London in December 1835 under the binomial name Pyrgita cinnamomea. His description was included in the volume of the society's proceedings for 1835 that was published on 8 April 1836. Its specific name comes from the Neo-Latin cinnamomeus, "cinnamon-coloured". The russet sparrow was described as Fringilla rutilans, by the Dutch zoologist Coenraad Jacob Temminck, from a specimen collected in Japan. Temminck's description is contained in his Nouveau recueil de planches coloriées d'oiseaux which was issued in 102 livraisons or parts between 1820 and 1839. It was at one time believed that the livraison containing the description of the russet sparrow was issued in 1835 but it has now been established that it appeared sometime in 1836 but as the precise date is not known under the rules of the International Commission on Zoological Nomenclature it is deemed to have been published on 31 December 1836. Most taxonomists give priority to Gould's publication and use the binomial name Passer cinnamomeus for the russet sparrow.

The russet sparrow has usually been placed in the genus Passer, and within this genus it is seen as a part of the "Palearctic black-bibbed sparrow" group, which includes the tree sparrow as well as the house sparrow. It has generally been seen as a close relation of the house sparrow, and Richard Meinertzhagen even considered it to be the same species as the Somali sparrow, one of the house sparrow's closest relatives.

However, studies of mitochondrial DNA indicate that the russet sparrow is an early offshoot or basal species among the Palearctic black-bibbed sparrows. While mitochrondrial DNA suggests speciation in Passer occurred during the Miocene and Pliocene, British ornithologist J. Denis Summers-Smith estimated that the russet sparrow separated from the other Palearctic black-bibbed sparrows about 25,000 to 15,000 years ago, during the last glacial period. During this time, sparrows would have been isolated in ice-free refugia, such as the lower Yangtze valley, which Summers-Smith considered the most likely centre of evolution for the russet sparrow.

Thirteen subspecies have been described, but only three are widely recognised, these differing largely in the colour of their underparts. The subspecies Passer cinnamomeus rutilans breeds in Japan, Korea, Taiwan, and southeastern and central China. The subspecies intensior, described in 1922 by Walter Rothschild from Yunnan, breeds in southwest China and parts of India, Burma, Laos, and Vietnam. In a large part of Sichuan intensior intergrades with P. c. rutilans, and a number of subspecies names have been proposed for the intergrades. The nominate subspecies cinnamomeus, described by Gould from the northwestern Himalayas, breeds from northern Arunachal Pradesh to Nuristan in Afghanistan.

== Description ==
The russet sparrow is a small chunky bird, with plumage warm rufous in overall colour. It is a medium-sized sparrow at 14 to 15 cm (5.5–5.9 in) and 18 to 22.5 grams (0.63–0.79 oz). It has a thick bill suited to eating seeds, which is black on the breeding male, horn-coloured on the non-breeding male, and yellowish with a dark tip on the female. Wingspans for males range between 6.8 to 8.2 cm (2.7–3.2 in) and those for females from 6.7 to 7.7 cm (2.6–3.0 in). Tail, bill, and tarsus lengths are 4.3 to 5.1 cm (1.7–2.0 in), 1.1 to 1.3 cm (0.43–0.51 in), and 1.6 to 1.8 cm (0.63–0.71 in), respectively.

Measurements for the russet sparrow vary geographically, between the three subspecies, and also within the Himalayan subspecies cinnamomeus. The subspecies cinnamomeus is generally larger than the others, and within this form there is a tendency for birds at higher altitudes to be larger, and a clinal variation in size with the smallest birds in the west of the range and the largest in the east.

The iris is chestnut in colour. The legs of both sexes are pale brown to pinkish-brown. The flight of all sparrows is swift, and that of the russet sparrow is described as swifter and more direct than that of the tree sparrow.

=== Plumage ===
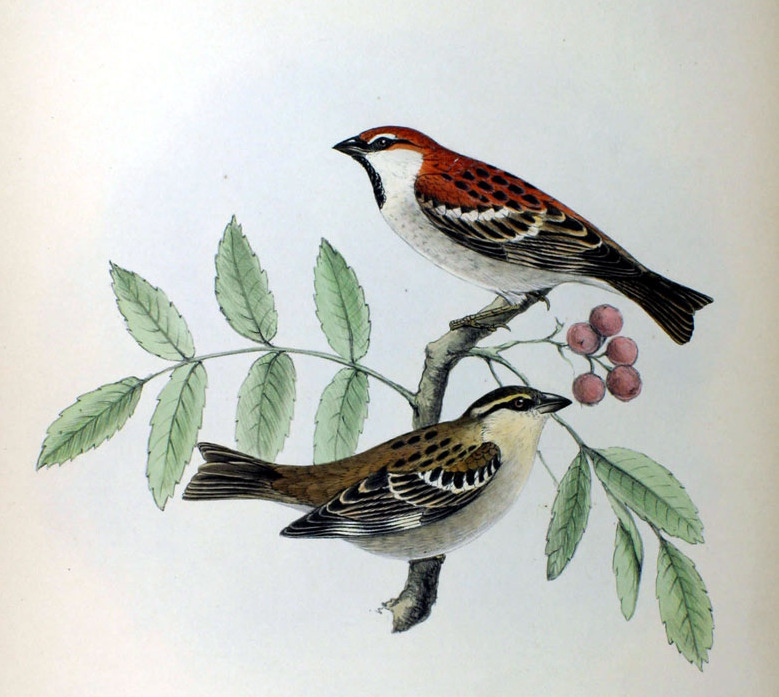
An illustration by Philipp Franz von Siebold from Fauna Japonica, in which the russet sparrow was described with the now synonymised name Passer russatus

The sexes differ, or are dimorphic, in their plumage, and have a similar pattern to that in the corresponding sex of house sparrow. There is some variation between the three subspecies, especially in the colouration of the underparts. Birds of the subspecies rutilans are off-white on their cheeks and the sides of their necks, and have pale grey underparts. Birds of the subspecies intensior have a pale yellow wash on their underparts and cheeks, as well as darker upperparts, while those of the subspecies cinnamomeus have a heavy yellow tinge to their underparts.

Moult is poorly recorded, the only records coming from Sakhalin and Himachal Pradesh. In Sakhalin, moult occurs in August and September, between the breeding season and migration. In Himachal Pradesh, aviculturalist G. A. Perreau observed captive and wild birds and reported that they were yellow from December to spring and whitish during the remainder of the year, a pattern which may be atypical.

The breeding male is bright russet or cinnamon red on its upperparts from its crown to its rump, with a black streaking on its mantle. It has a small black bib and black around its eye, separated from the russet of its crown by a very thin white supercilium, a stripe running from the bill to the rear of the head. The side of its neck and cheek are off-white, and its underparts are pale grey or washed with yellow, varying geographically. Shoulders and greater coverts are chestnut, and its median coverts are black at the base with white at the tips. The rest of the wing is light brown with black tinges. Its tail is blackish brown, edged with ashy brown. The non-breeding male differs little from the breeding male, being paler with more orange upperparts. The only species with which the male is easily confused is the tree sparrow, which differs in its black cheek spot and brown back.

The female has mostly pale brown upperparts, and pale grey underparts, so it resembles the female house sparrow. It differs from the house sparrow in its slightly darker, russet-tinged plumage. It has a conspicuous cream supercilium from above its eye nearly around its head, and a bold dark brown stripe through its eye. It has mostly greyish brown wings and a back streaked with black and buff. The juvenile is similar to the female, though more pale and sandy. As the male reaches its first winter, it resembles the adult, differing in less bold chestnut and a dusky bib.

=== Voice ===
The russet sparrow's vocalisations are described by most sources as "the sweetest and most musical" of any sparrow. Its basic call is a cheep or chilp, similar to that of other sparrows. This call is monosyllabic, unlike the house sparrow's chirrup call, and is softer than that of the other sparrows. This call is given as a flight call, or by displaying males. Recorded variations include a chweep given by males at the nest and a trilled cheeep. Sometimes the male strings calls together and sings them in a strident tone, to create a sort of short song, transcribed as cheep chirrup cheeweep or chreet-chreet-chreet. The song is interspersed with sibilant chu-swik notes similar to those of the white wagtail. A thin swee swee vocalisation not unlike that of an Indian robin has been reported, but the context of this call is unrecorded. During territorial disputes, males give a rapid chit-chit-chit call.

== Distribution and habitat ==
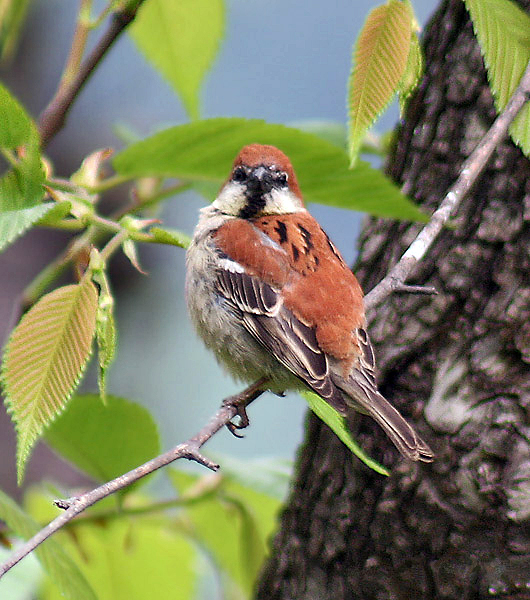
Breeding male in Kullu, India

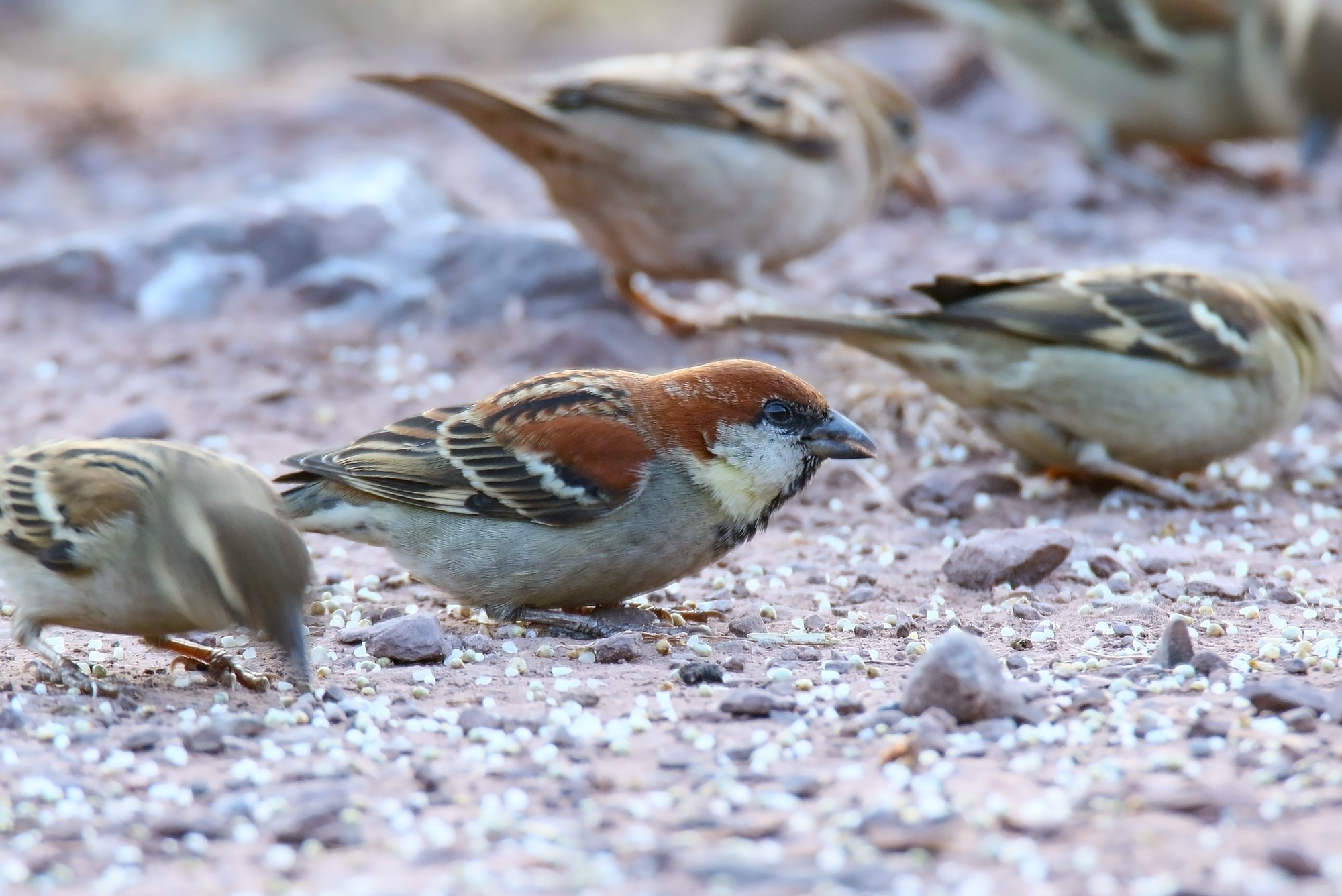
A wintering flock of russet sparrows in Murree, Pakistan

The russet sparrow is found in parts of eastern Asia and in the Himalayas. It is not known whether its distribution is continuous between these two areas, since the political sensitivity of the Brahmaputra River's valley near the China-India border makes the area less accessible to ornithologists. In the Himalayas the russet sparrow breeds from the far northeast of India through southeastern Tibet, Bhutan, Sikkim, Nepal, Uttarakhand, and Himachal Pradesh to Kashmir and Nuristan in Afghanistan. Here, the russet sparrow makes short movements to lower altitudes between November and April in many areas.

In eastern Asia, the russet sparrow is found in Sakhalin, the Kuril Islands, a small part of mainland Russia, Japan, southern Korea, and part of northern China, where it is mostly migratory. It is distributed through southern China and Taiwan, and the mountainous parts of Burma, southern Northeast India, Laos, and Vietnam, where it is mostly resident. The russet sparrow also occurs as a winter visitor in southern Japan, the further south of China, and northern Thailand. In eastern Asia, the autumn migration occurs between August and November.

The russet sparrow appears to be abundant in most habitats across most of its very large range, and in some areas it is among the most common birds. In Southeast Asia, its range has contracted at lower elevations due to global warming, but it has also moved higher at high elevations and it remains common. Although its global population has not been quantified, it is assessed for the IUCN Red List as least concern for global extinction.

Breeding takes place in mountains and uplands across most of the range. This preference for high altitudes is influenced by latitude: in the farthest south of its range it never breeds below 2,500 metres (8,200 ft) above mean sea level, but in the northernmost part of its range it often breeds by the sea. In eastern Asia, the russet sparrow prefers light woodland, but it is sometimes found in towns and agricultural areas. In Sakhalin, it breeds mostly in riparian forest. In Hokkaidō, the russet sparrow finds a greater food supply for its young in more remote forests, and has greater reproductive success.

In the Himalayas, it is strongly associated with terrace cultivation, and it probably only spread to the Himalayas when these agricultural practices arrived 3000 to 4000 years ago. In towns where it occurs alongside the house or tree sparrow, it is found in gardens and less built up areas. In those hill stations in India where both the house and the russet sparrow occur, the house sparrow breeds around more-built up areas and bazaars, whereas the russet sparrow is "rather more up market at the larger houses with gardens and open spaces". In towns where it is the only sparrow, it is not dependent on trees, breeding around houses and eating scraps in streets. In the winter, migratory birds occur in open cultivated land and riverine grasslands, but are never far from shrubs or trees.

== Behaviour ==
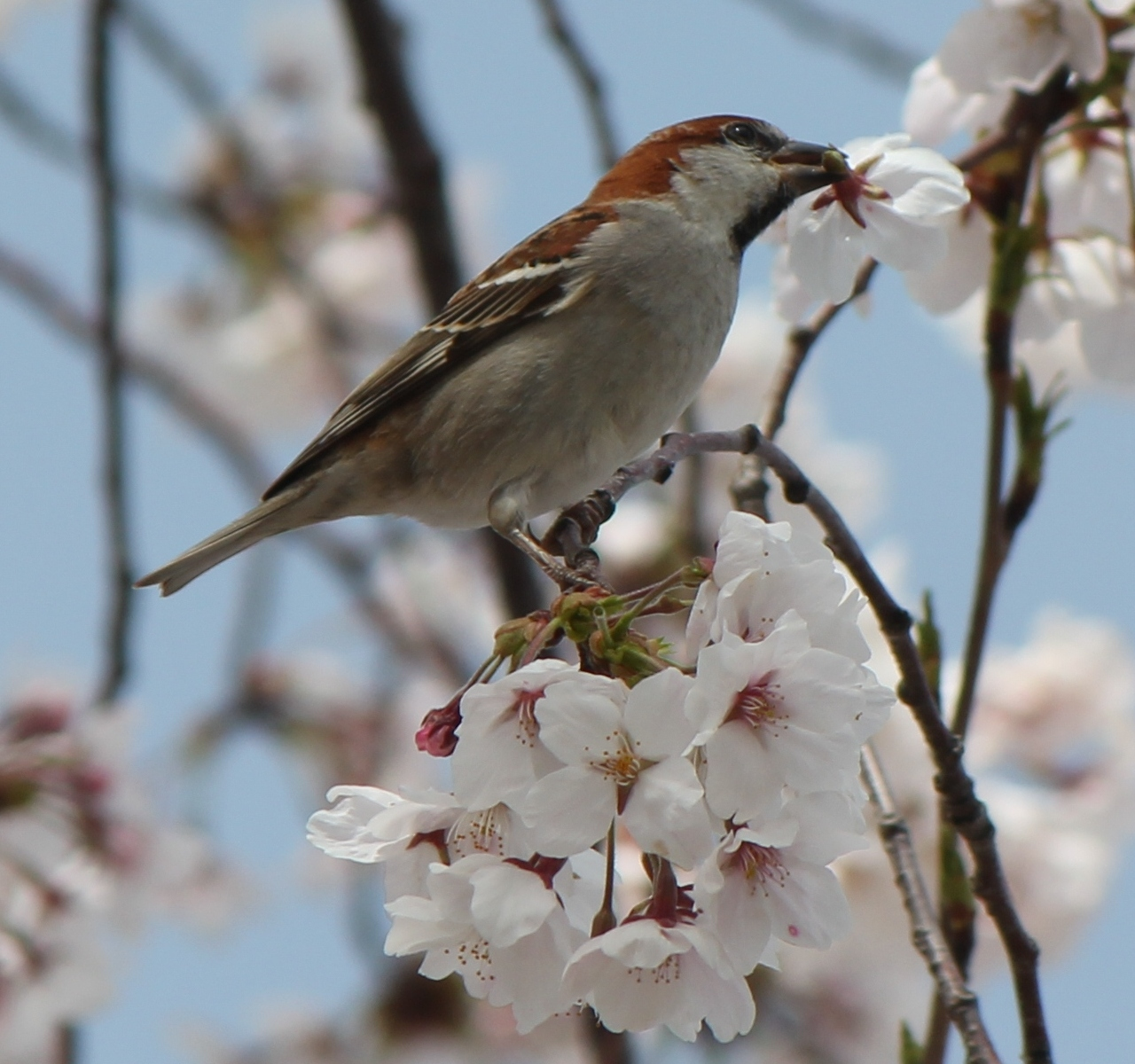
A male eating Yoshino cherry blossoms, in Aichi Prefecture, Japan

In many aspects of its behaviour, the russet sparrow is similar to the house and tree sparrows. Like them, it feeds on the ground, but spends most of its time perching on branches. Unlike those species, it prefers open, exposed branches for perching. The russet sparrow is described as shy and wary by some observers, but J. Denis Summers-Smith found it approachable in Indian hill stations. Flocking russet sparrows feed close to the ground, moving forward as birds from the rear of a flock move to the front, in what is called "roller feeding".

Outside its breeding season, the russet sparrow is gregarious and forms flocks to find food, though it infrequently associates with other birds. Wintering flocks tend to keep away from human habitation. The russet sparrow is also social at night during the winter, and it forms large communal roosts in trees and bushes. In the breeding season, the female roosts in the nests and the male nests in foliage nearby.

The adult russet sparrow is mostly a seed-eater, eating the seeds of herbs and weeds as well as rice, barley, and other grains. Berries, such as those of the kingore (certain Berberis spp.), are also eaten when available. Nestlings are fed mostly on insects, especially caterpillars and larval beetles obtained on trees and flying insects caught by aerial pursuit. During the breeding season adults also consume insects.

Mortality rates in the russet sparrow have not been studied, but it is known that many young birds die from Isospora infections, to which the bird has little resistance. Other recorded parasites of the russet sparrow include Protocalliphora blowflies, and Menacanthus chewing lice.

=== Breeding ===
The russet sparrow's breeding season is short, lasting about three months. The Himalayan subspecies cinnamomeus has been recorded breeding from April to August, the nominate subspecies breeds from May to July, and the subspecies intensior is believed to breed in March. During its breeding season, the russet sparrow is not gregarious, and its nests are dispersed uniformly rather than clustered. Its nests are most frequently built in tree cavities, often disused woodpecker nests. The russet sparrow has been recorded breeding alongside the tree sparrow and white wagtail in black kite nests, taking advantage of the territorial defence of the kites to avoid nest predation. Other nest locations include the eaves of thatched roofs, stone walls and embankments, and electric junction boxes. In Bhutan, it nests in holes in the outer walls of monasteries, often alongside the tree sparrow. In Sakhalin, it will sometimes build free-standing nests in bushes. The russet sparrow also uses the disused nests of the red-rumped swallow, and a pair of russet sparrows has been recorded attempting to oust a pair of black-crested tits from their nest.

The male chooses the nest site, and uses it for his courtship display, spending much time calling nearby. When a female comes near a male at his nest the male begins to display by raising his head, drooping his wings, pushing his chest forward, and lowering his tail. He then bows up and down in front of the female, who will lunge and then fly away if unreceptive. Both sexes take part in building the nest, which consists of a loose, untidy bunch of dry grass which fills the nesting cavity, lined with fur and feathers for warmth.

Eggs are elongated ovals, with a fine texture and a slight gloss. They are whitish in overall colour with a grey tinge and brown spots, streaks, or blotches. The average size of the egg is 19.2×14.2 millimetres (0.75×0.55 in). Eggs are similar to those of the tree sparrow, differing in a duller colour and more narrow shape, though they cannot be separated from those of the other sparrows with certainty. Two clutches of four or sometimes five or six eggs are laid in a year. In Hokkaidō, clutches are laid between early May and early July, with two peaks in laying around mid May and late June. Both sexes incubate and feed the young, with the male often being more active in feeding the nestlings. In Hokkaidō, nestlings hatch weighing about 2 to 5 grams (0.071 to 0.176 oz), and fledge 14 or 15 days after hatching, weighing 15 to 55 grams (0.53 to 1.94 oz). The common cuckoo has been recorded in old literature as a brood parasite of the russet sparrow.

== Relationships with humans ==
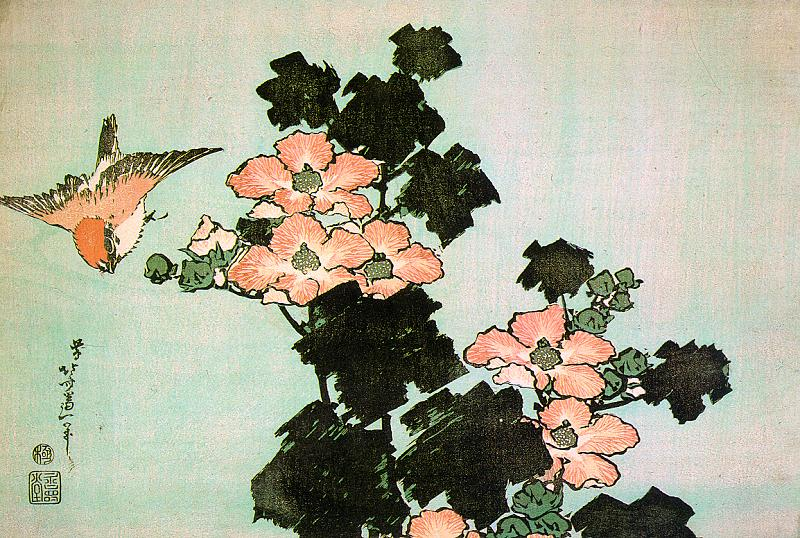
The c. 1830 woodblock "Hibiscus and Sparrow" by the Japanese artist Hokusai, which portrays the russet sparrow

In parts of the range, the russet sparrow inhabits towns, and in most of its range, it occurs near cultivation, and is a minor pest of agriculture. Though it damages crops, it also feeds its nestlings largely on insect pests. In China, the russet sparrow has been recorded as a captive bird, kept with the tree sparrow. In Japan it was eaten in the 1870s and sold in the Yokohama game market. The russet sparrow is known well enough in the Himalayas that in most languages it has a different vernacular name from the tree sparrow. Examples of these vernacular names include lal gouriya in Hindi and kang-che-go-ma in Tibetan. The Japanese artist Hokusai portrayed the russet sparrow, and due to this, it has appeared on postage stamps featuring Japanese art in Japan, The Gambia, and Guyana.
