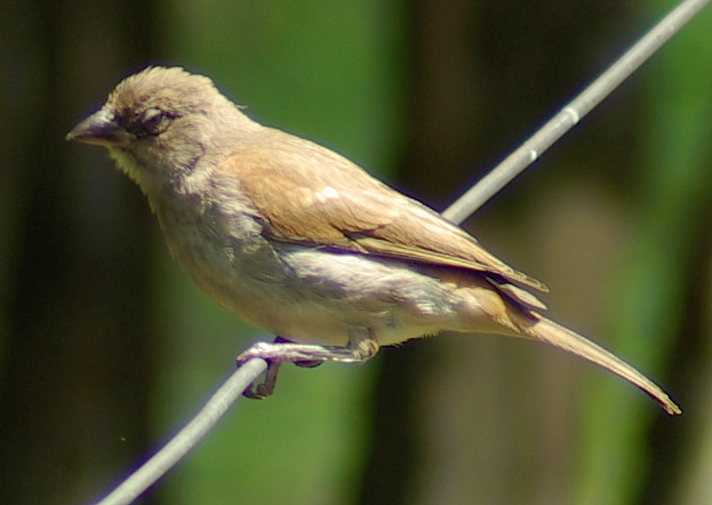
- Adult at a bird feeder at Masai Mara National Reserve, Kenya

Conservation status
- Least Concern (IUCN 3.1)

Scientific classification
- Kingdom: Animalia
- Phylum: Chordata
- Class: Aves
- Order: Passeriformes
- Family: Passeridae
- Genus: Passer
- Species: P. suahelicus

Binomial name
- Passer suahelicus Reichenow, 1904

= Swahili sparrow =

Species of bird

The Swahili sparrow (Passer suahelicus) is a passerine bird of the sparrow family Passeridae. It lives in the savanna of southern Kenya and Tanzania. Until recently, it was usually treated as a subspecies of the northern grey-headed sparrow (Passer griseus), with which it hybridizes in southern Tanzania and possibly elsewhere. It has a more rounded head profile however, a smaller eye and the grey head plumage extends unto the mantle.

In addition to the subtle physical characteristics, the Swahili sparrow also differs from the northern grey-headed sparrow in terms of habitat preference, nest construction and post-breeding behaviour. They build grass nests in Acacia trees in dry regions, and generally avoid moister coastal lowlands or uplands. Following the breeding season they form nomadic flocks, and the bill colour will change from black to horn-coloured. They may nest in the proximity of northern grey-headed sparrow, but not on buildings, and may be found beside individuals of the latter species as they disperse onto farmland.
