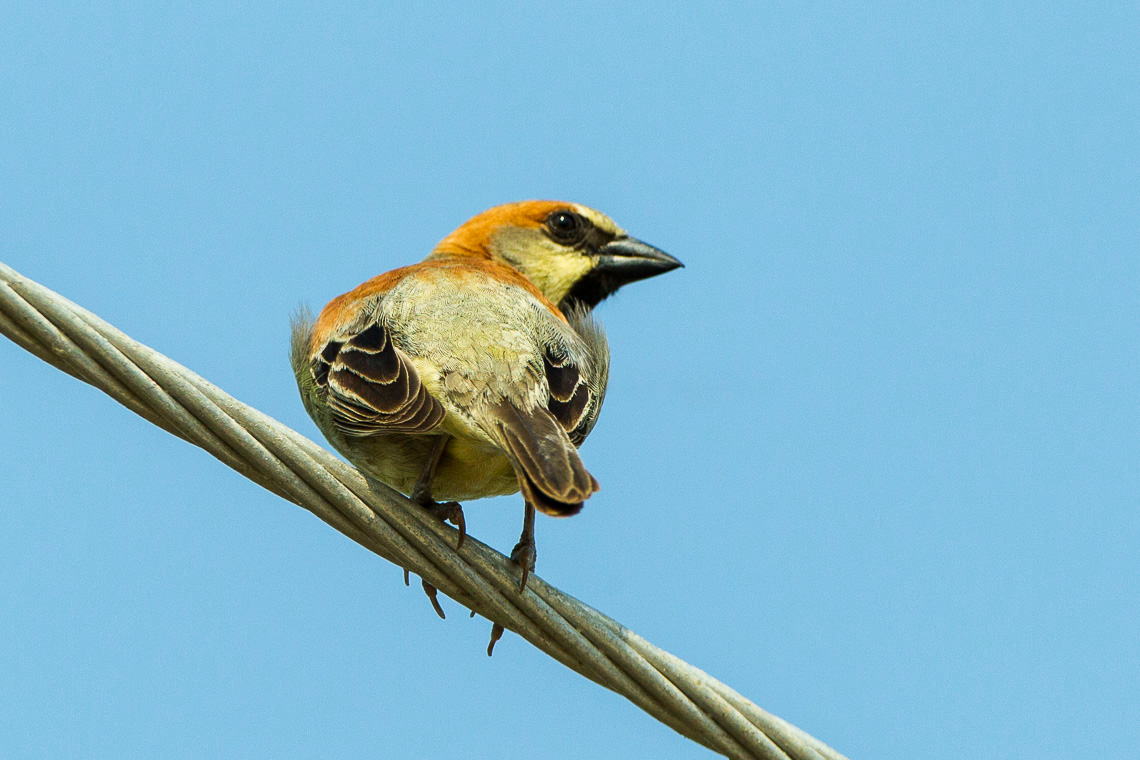
- Male in Thailand

Conservation status
- Least Concern (IUCN 3.1)

Scientific classification
- Kingdom: Animalia
- Phylum: Chordata
- Class: Aves
- Order: Passeriformes
- Family: Passeridae
- Genus: Passer
- Species: P. flaveolus

Binomial name
- Passer flaveolus Blyth, 1845

Synonyms
- Passer jugiferus Bonaparte, 1850; Passer assimilis Walden, 1870

= Plain-backed sparrow =

Species of bird

The plain-backed sparrow (Passer flaveolus), also called the Pegu sparrow or olive-backed sparrow, is a sparrow found in Southeast Asia. Its range spans from Myanmar to central Vietnam, and south to the western part of Peninsular Malaysia.
