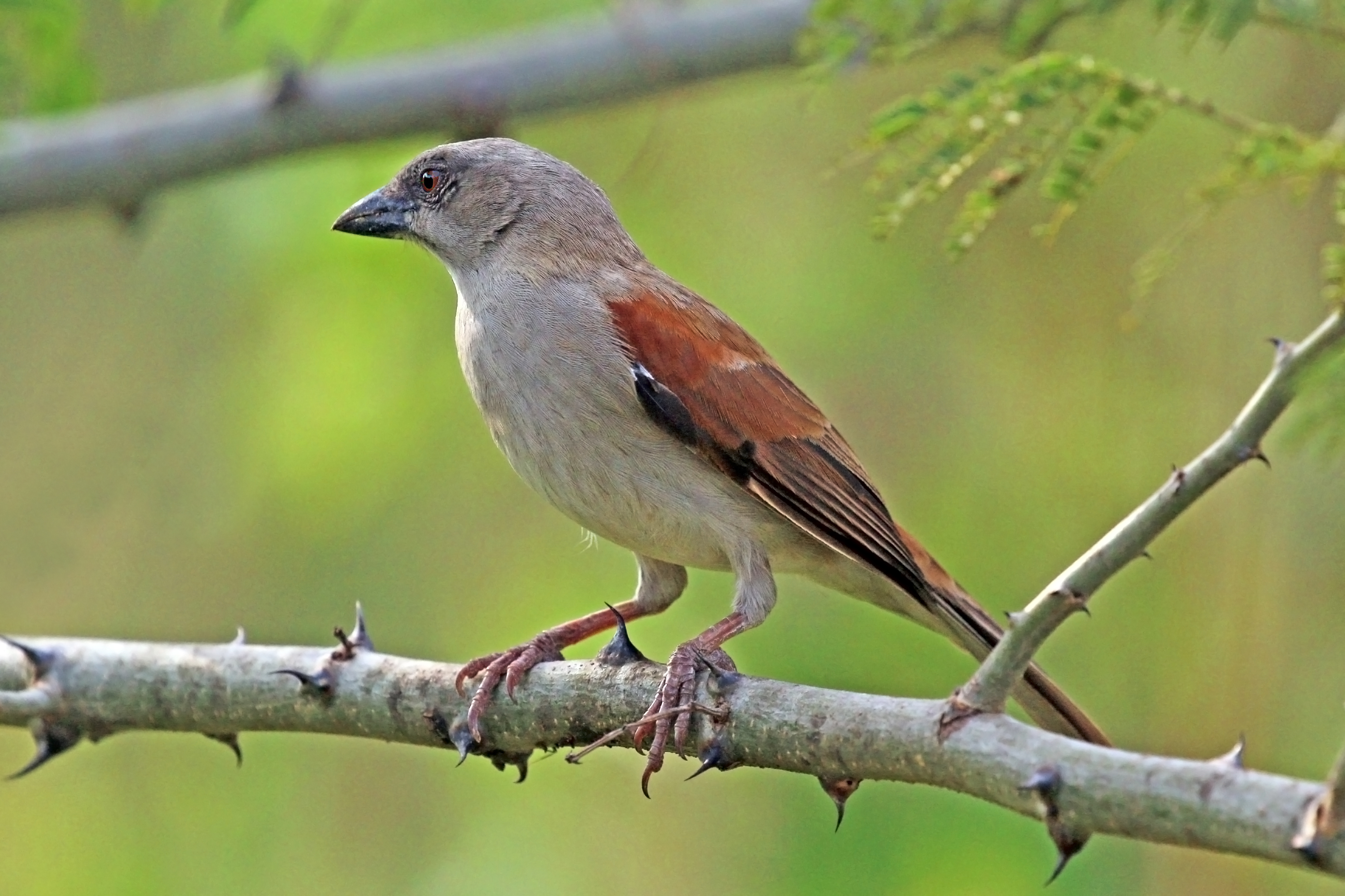
- P. g. ugandae Semliki Wildlife Reserve, Uganda
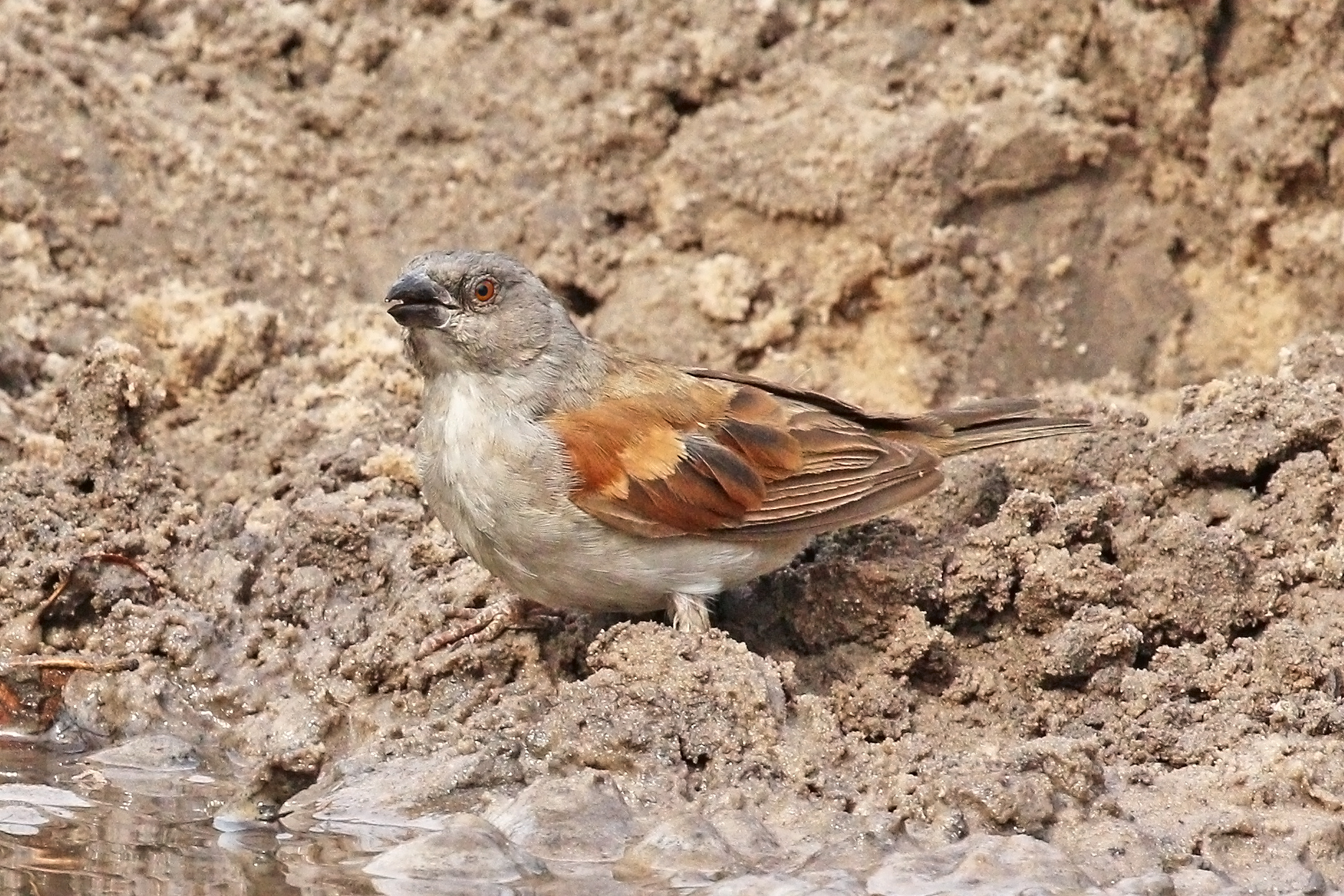
- P. g. griseus Senegal

Conservation status
- Least Concern (IUCN 3.1)

Scientific classification
- Kingdom: Animalia
- Phylum: Chordata
- Class: Aves
- Order: Passeriformes
- Family: Passeridae
- Genus: Passer
- Species: P. griseus

Binomial name
- Passer griseus (Vieillot, 1817)

= Northern grey-headed sparrow =

Species of bird

The northern grey-headed sparrow (Passer griseus), also known as the grey-headed sparrow, is a species of bird in the sparrow family Passeridae, which is resident in much of tropical Africa. It occurs in a wide range of open habitats, including open woodlands and human habitation, often occupying the same niche as the house sparrow does in Eurasia.

The adult northern grey-headed sparrow has a pale grey head with a white moustache stripe, pale brown upperparts, whitish underparts and chestnut wings with a small white shoulder patch. The sexes are similar, but young birds are slightly duller and lack the white wing patch. There are three subspecies, differing in plumage tone, especially with regard to the darkness of the head.

This sparrow is mainly resident in its range, but there is some seasonal movement, and flocks of up to 50 birds form outside the breeding season. It builds a cup nest in trees, thatch, or old nests of other birds; 2–4 eggs are laid.

This species feeds principally on seeds and grain, like other sparrows, but will readily take insects including termites, especially when feeding young.

The calls include cheeps and chirps, and the typical sparrow churring alarm call.

The northern grey-headed sparrow is replaced in eastern and southern Africa by very similar birds that are sometimes considered races of this species: Swainson's sparrow, the parrot-billed sparrow, the Swahili sparrow, and the southern grey-headed sparrow.
