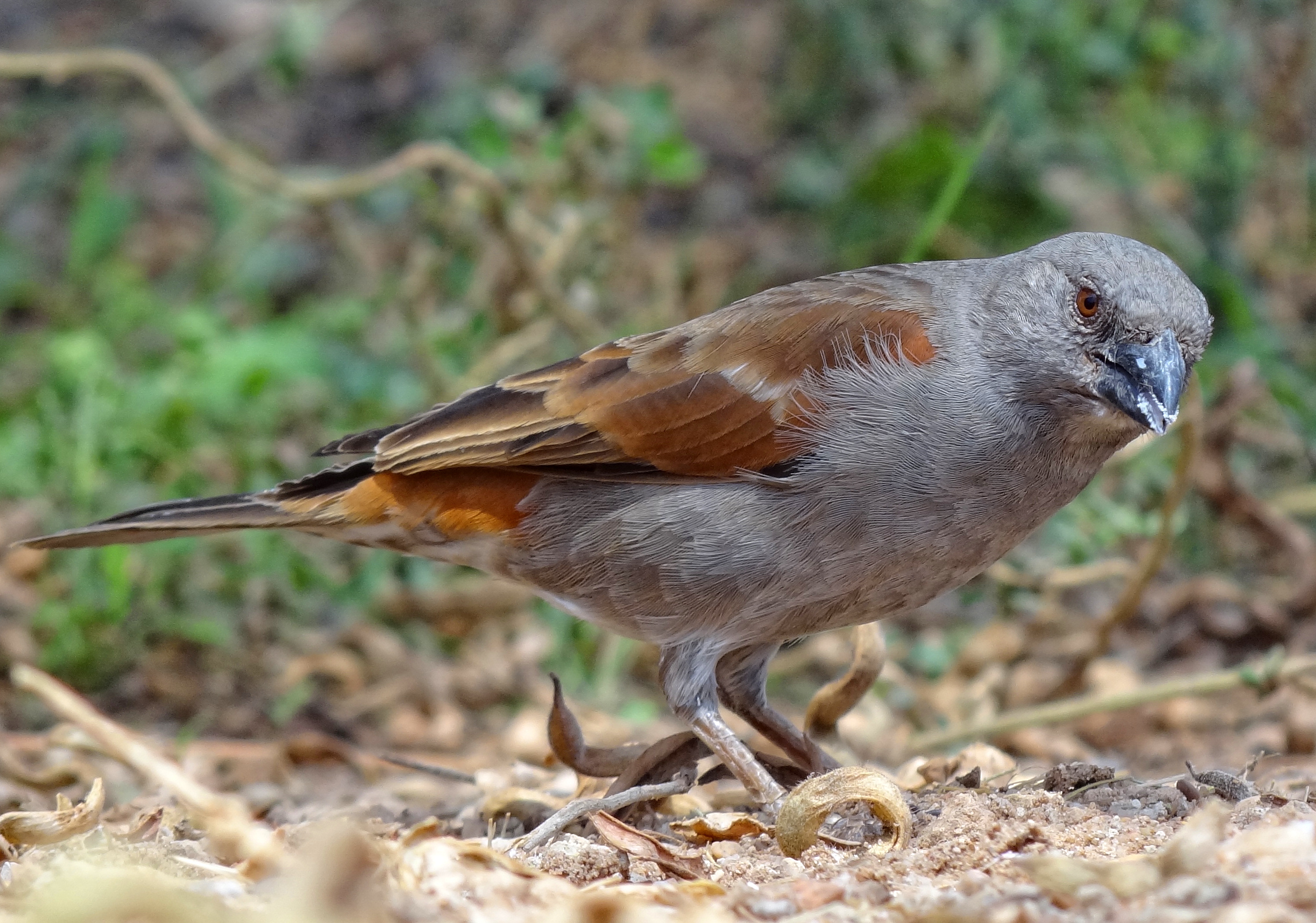
- In Amboseli National Park, Kenya

Conservation status
- Least Concern (IUCN 3.1)

Scientific classification
- Kingdom: Animalia
- Phylum: Chordata
- Class: Aves
- Order: Passeriformes
- Family: Passeridae
- Genus: Passer
- Species: P. gongonensis

Binomial name
- Passer gongonensis (Oustalet, 1890)

= Parrot-billed sparrow =

Species of bird

The parrot-billed sparrow (Passer gongonensis) is found in the arid lowlands of eastern Africa. At 18 centimetres (7.1 in) and 42 grams (1.5 oz), it is the largest of the sparrows of the family Passeridae. It is often considered a subspecies of the grey-headed sparrow.
