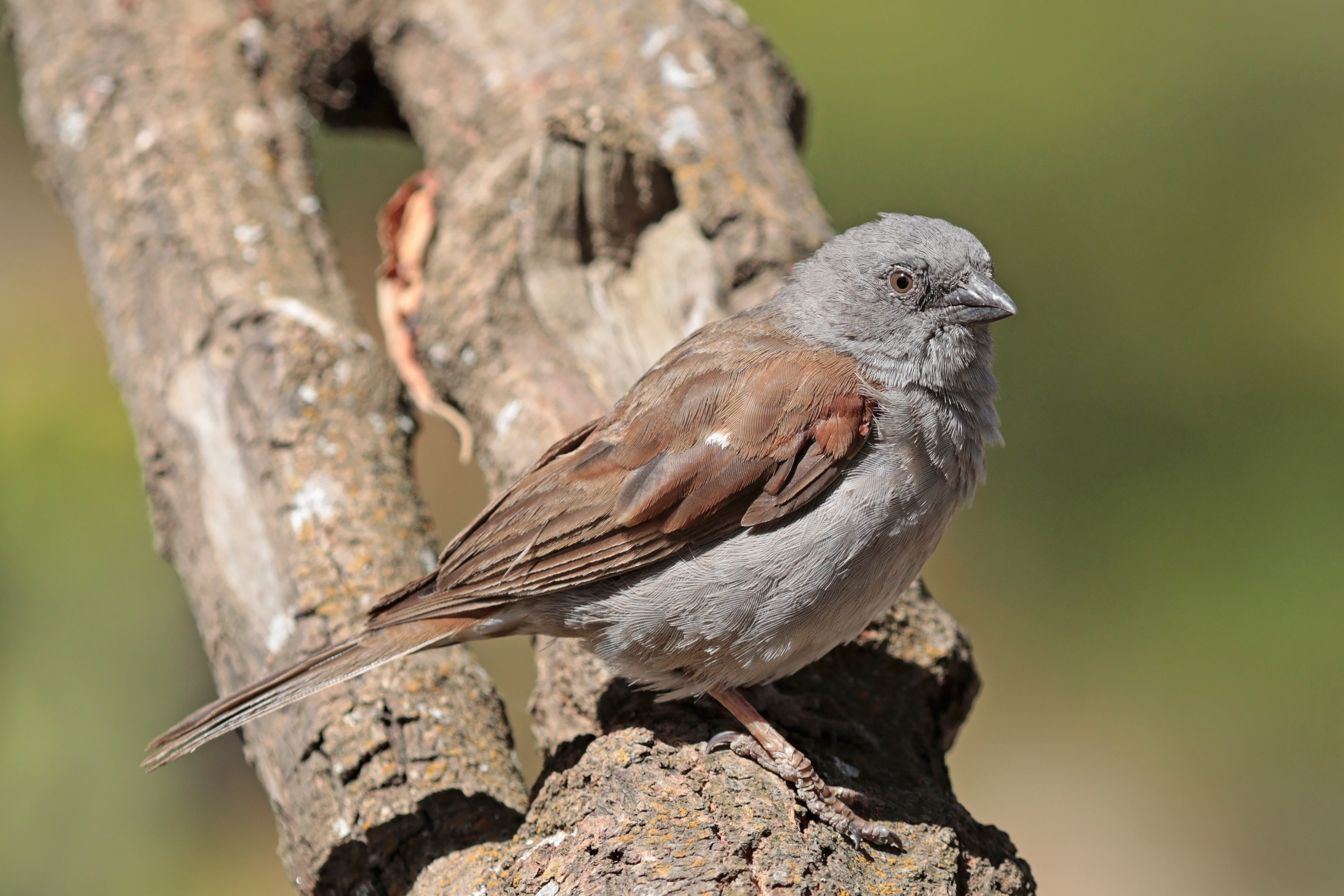
- Near Debre Libanos, Ethiopia

Conservation status
- Least Concern (IUCN 3.1)

Scientific classification
- Kingdom: Animalia
- Phylum: Chordata
- Class: Aves
- Order: Passeriformes
- Family: Passeridae
- Genus: Passer
- Species: P. swainsonii

Binomial name
- Passer swainsonii (Rüppell, 1840)

= Swainson's sparrow =

Species of bird

The Swainson's sparrow (Passer swainsonii) is a species of bird in the sparrow family Passeridae. Sometimes considered a subspecies of the grey-headed sparrow, it occurs in northeastern Africa, largely in the Ethiopian Highlands. This sparrow was named after the English naturalist and illustrator William Swainson.

== Description ==
The Swainson's sparrow reaches a body length of 16 centimetres (6.3 in). There is no conspicuous sexual dimorphism.

It is often considered a race of grey-headed sparrow, but it tends to be darker, especially on the head and shoulders. There is a white bar on the shoulder, but this is not always visible. Similarly, the pale chestnut tail and rump is not always visible.

== Distribution and habitat ==
It occurs in the highlands of Ethiopia and Somalia, and in some of Sudan, South Sudan, Eritrea, Djibouti, and Kenya. Apart from the far west, it is common throughout its range. Some populations show seasonal migrations.

The habitats of the Swainson's sparrow are mountainous areas, marshes, open forest areas, savannas and shrubby grasslands. However, most often it occurs in human settlements and their surroundings. In Eritrea, it lives mostly on the open plateau at an altitude of 1,200 metres (3,900 ft) above sea level, and in Ethiopia it occurs in areas of 1,200–4,500 metres (3,900–14,800 ft) above sea level.

In Ethiopian towns it is the common sparrow, similarly to the house sparrow in most of Eurasia.

== Behaviour ==
Swainson's sparrows eat mostly seeds of grasses and cereals, and insects.

The nest is a loose ball assembled from grass and feathers. A nest may be built on branches, or in the crown of palm trees, or in tree hollows. The birds also use cavities in buildings, and the old nests of the Ethiopian swallow and African sand martin. They have been observed once removing nestlings of the African sand martin to take over their nests. A clutch contains three to six eggs. They are white with brown and gray spots. The breeding season falls in Eritrea during January to March and May to November, in Ethiopia breeding may occur from April to December.

Outside the breeding season they live in flocks, sometimes consisting of several hundred individuals. Swarms of this size can cause some damage when they come in agricultural regions and gardens.
