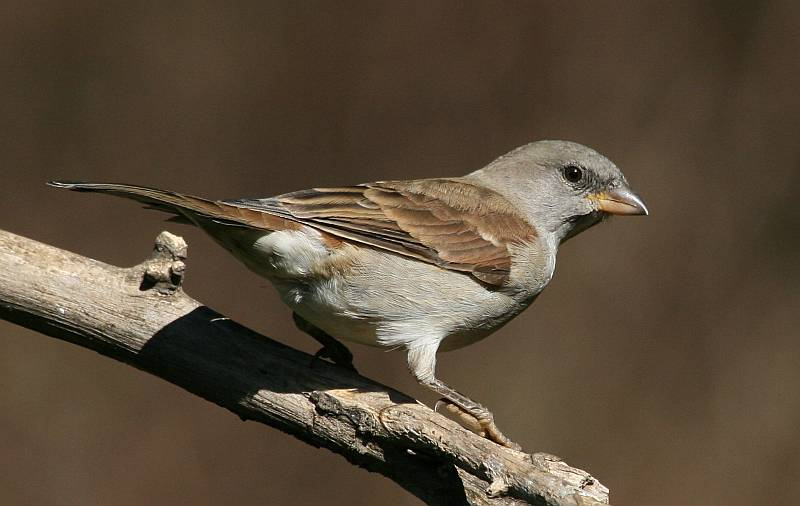
- Non-breeding adult, Pietermaritzburg, South Africa

Conservation status
- Least Concern (IUCN 3.1)

Scientific classification
- Kingdom: Animalia
- Phylum: Chordata
- Class: Aves
- Order: Passeriformes
- Family: Passeridae
- Genus: Passer
- Species: P. diffusus

Binomial name
- Passer diffusus (Smith, 1836)

= Southern grey-headed sparrow =

Species of bird

The southern grey-headed sparrow (Passer diffusus) is a passerine bird of the sparrow family Passeridae. It is sometimes treated as a subspecies of the grey-headed sparrow. It is found in savanna and woodland in Angola and Zambia southwards into South Africa, where it is expanding its range and is kept as a caged bird, like its relative the white-rumped seedeater.
