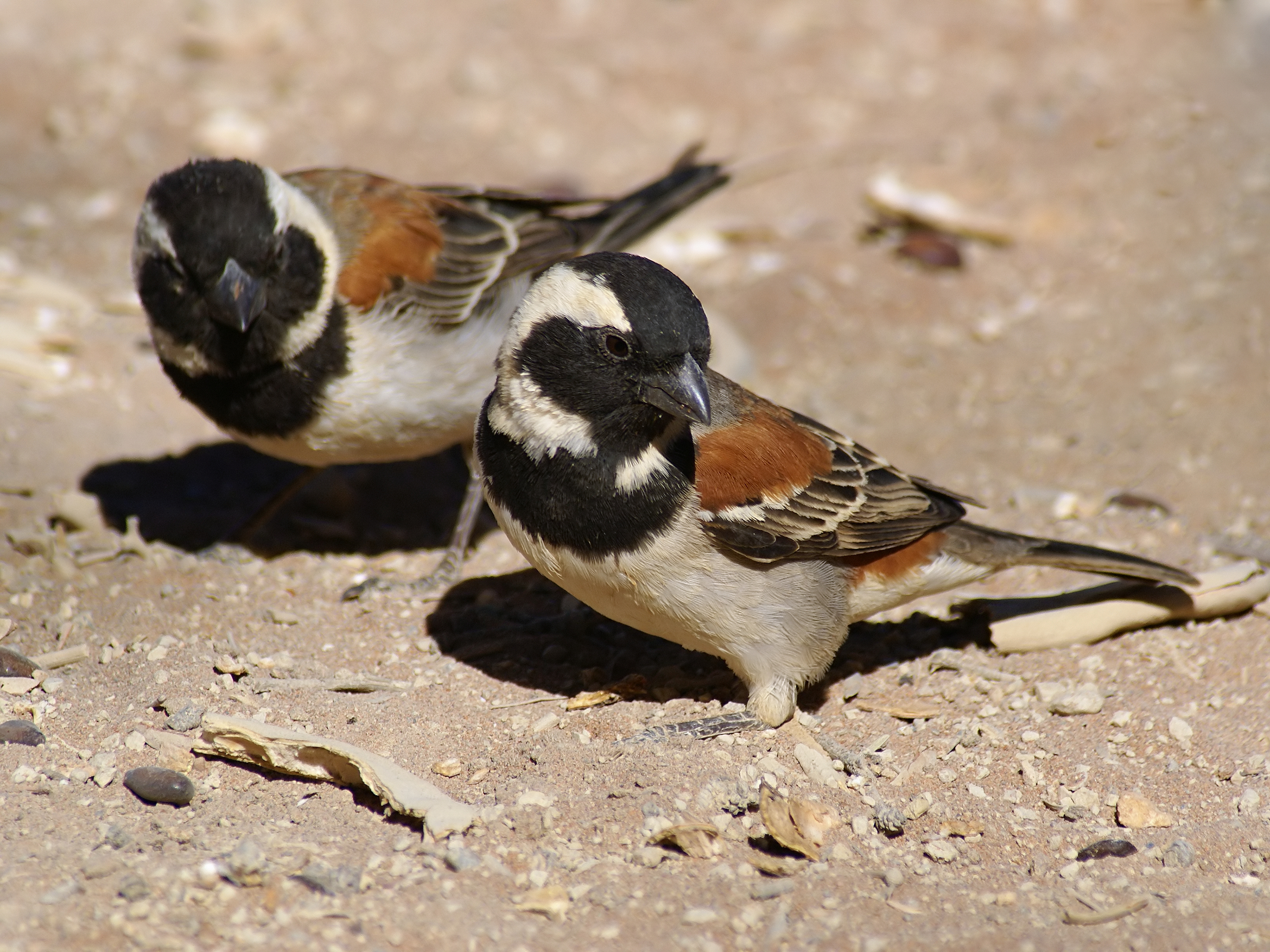
- Male Cape sparrows in Namibia

Scientific classification
- Kingdom: Animalia
- Phylum: Chordata
- Class: Aves
- Order: Passeriformes
- Family: Passeridae
- Genus: Passer; Brisson, 1760

Type species
- Fringilla domestica Linnaeus, 1758

Species
- See text.

Synonyms
- List: Pyrgita Cuvier, 1817; Corospiza Bonaparte, 1850; Auripasser Bonaparte, 1851; Sorella Hartlaub, 1880; Ammopasser Zarudny, 1880

= Passer =

Genus of birds

Passer is a genus of sparrows, also known as the true sparrows. The genus contains 28 species and includes the house sparrow and the Eurasian tree sparrow – two of the most common birds in the world. They are small birds with thick bills for eating seeds and are mostly coloured grey or brown. Native to the Old World, some species have been introduced throughout the world.

== Taxonomy ==
The genus Passer was introduced by the French zoologist Mathurin Jacques Brisson in 1760. The type species was subsequently designated as the house sparrow (Passer domesticus). The name Passer is the Latin word for "sparrow."

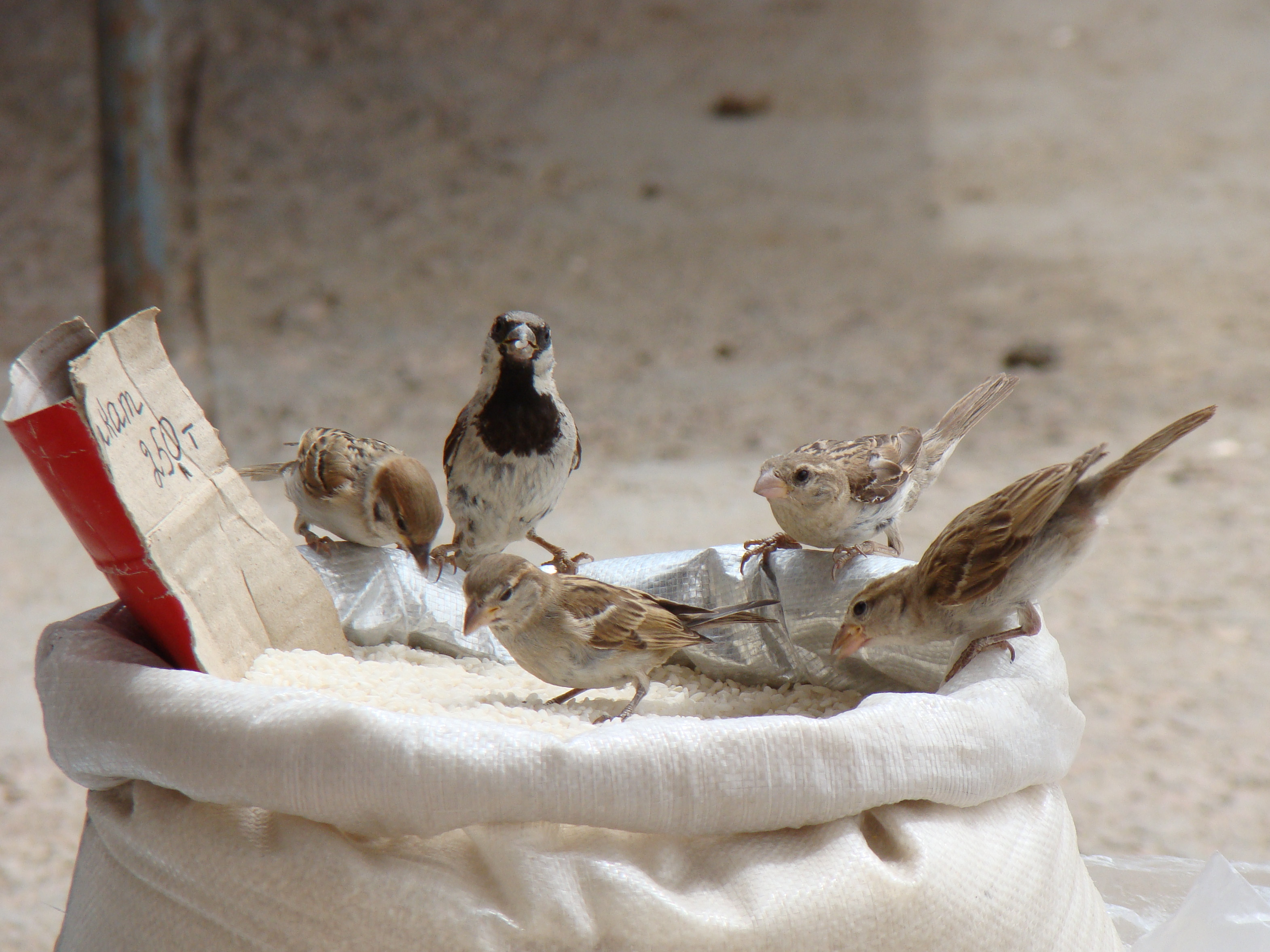
A mixed group of Passer sparrows containing a Eurasian tree sparrow, a male house sparrow, and female house or Spanish sparrows, feeding on grain in the town of Baikonur, Kazakhstan

=== Species ===
The genus contains 28 species:

Image	Common name	Scientific name	Distribution
	Cape sparrow	Passer melanurus	central coast of Angola to eastern South Africa and Swaziland
	Chestnut sparrow	Passer eminibey	Darfur in Sudan to Tanzania
	Kordofan sparrow	Passer cordofanicus	South Sudan and Chad
	Shelley's sparrow	Passer shelleyi	eastern Africa from South Sudan, southern Ethiopia, and north-western Somalia to northern Uganda and north-western Kenya
	Kenya sparrow	Passer rufocinctus	Kenya and Tanzania
	Great sparrow	Passer motitensis	southern Africa
	Northern grey-headed sparrow	Passer griseus	tropical Africa
	Swainson's sparrow	Passer swainsonii	northeastern Africa
	Swahili sparrow	Passer suahelicus	southern Kenya and Tanzania
	Parrot-billed sparrow	Passer gongonensis	eastern Africa
	Southern grey-headed sparrow	Passer diffusus	Angola and Zambia southwards into South Africa
	Sind sparrow	Passer pyrrhonotus	Indus valley region in South Asia
	Russet sparrow	Passer cinnamomeus	southeastern Tibet, Bhutan, Sikkim, Nepal, Uttarakhand, and Himachal Pradesh to Kashmir and Nuristan in Afghanistan, as well as China, Korea, and Japan
	Eurasian tree sparrow	Passer montanus	Temperate Eurasia and Southeast Asia. Introduced in Sardinia, eastern Indonesia, the Philippines, Micronesia, Victoria and New South Wales in Australia and the U.S. states of Missouri, Illinois and Iowa.
	Saxaul sparrow	Passer ammodendri	Central Asia
	Plain-backed sparrow	Passer flaveolus	Myanmar to central Vietnam, and south to the western part of Peninsular Malaysia
	Abd al-Kuri sparrow	Passer hemileucus	Abd al Kuri in the Socotra archipelago
	Socotra sparrow	Passer insularis	islands of Socotra, Samhah, and Darsah
	Spanish sparrow	Passer hispaniolensis	Mediterranean region, Macaronesia and south-west and central Asia
	Italian sparrow	Passer italiae	northern and central Italy, Corsica, and small parts of France, Switzerland, Austria, and Slovenia
	House sparrow	Passer domesticus	Middle East, Eurasia and parts of North Africa. Introduced in subarctic North America, southern South America, southern Africa, eastern Australia, New Zealand and Hawaii
	Somali sparrow	Passer castanopterus	northern Somalia, Djibouti, Ethiopia and Kenya.
	Iago sparrow	Passer iagoensis	archipelago of Cape Verde
	Desert sparrow	Passer simplex	Sahara Desert of northern Africa
	Zarudny's sparrow	Passer zarudnyi	Uzbekistan and Turkmenistan
	Arabian golden sparrow	Passer euchlorus	south west Arabia and also the coast of Somalia and Djibouti
	Sudan golden sparrow	Passer luteus	sub-Saharan Africa
	Dead Sea sparrow	Passer moabiticus	Middle East and another in western Afghanistan and eastern Iran

Besides these living species, there are questionable fossils from as long ago as the Early Miocene, and Passer predomesticus, from the Middle Pleistocene.

== Description ==
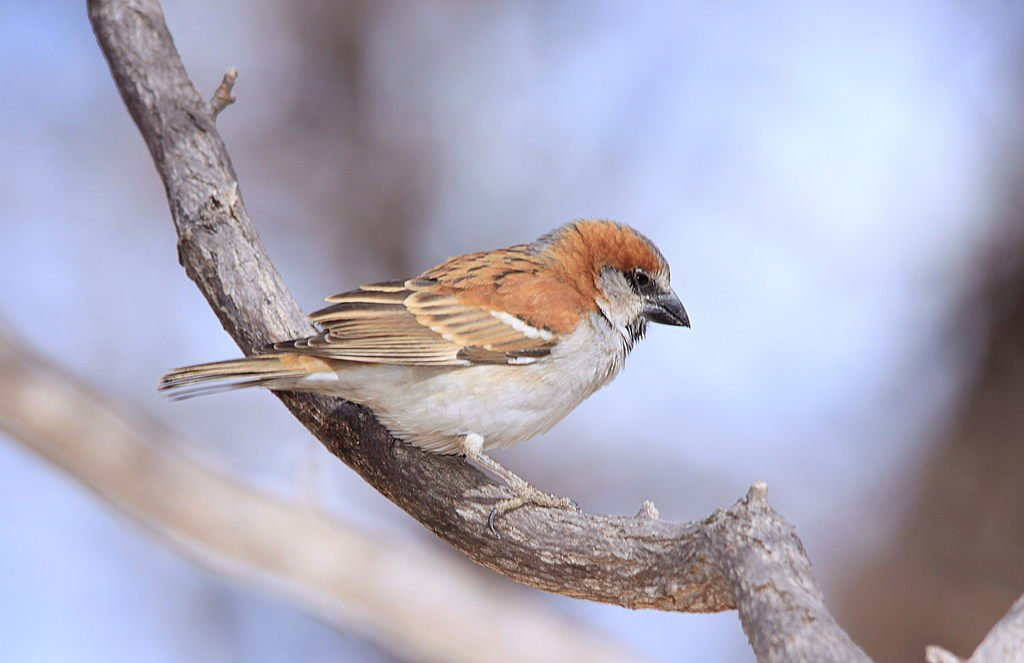
A great sparrow in Marakele National Park, South Africa

These sparrows are plump little brown or greyish birds, often with black, yellow or white markings. Typically 10–20 centimetres (3.9–7.9 in) long, they range in size from the chestnut sparrow (Passer eminibey), at 11.4 centimetres (4.5 in) and 13.4 grams (0.47 oz), to the parrot-billed sparrow (Passer gongonensis), at 18 centimetres (7.1 in) and 42 grams (1.5 oz). They have strong, stubby conical beaks with decurved culmens and blunter tips. All species have calls similar to the house sparrow's chirrup or tschilp call, and some, though not the house sparrow, have elaborate songs.

== Distribution ==
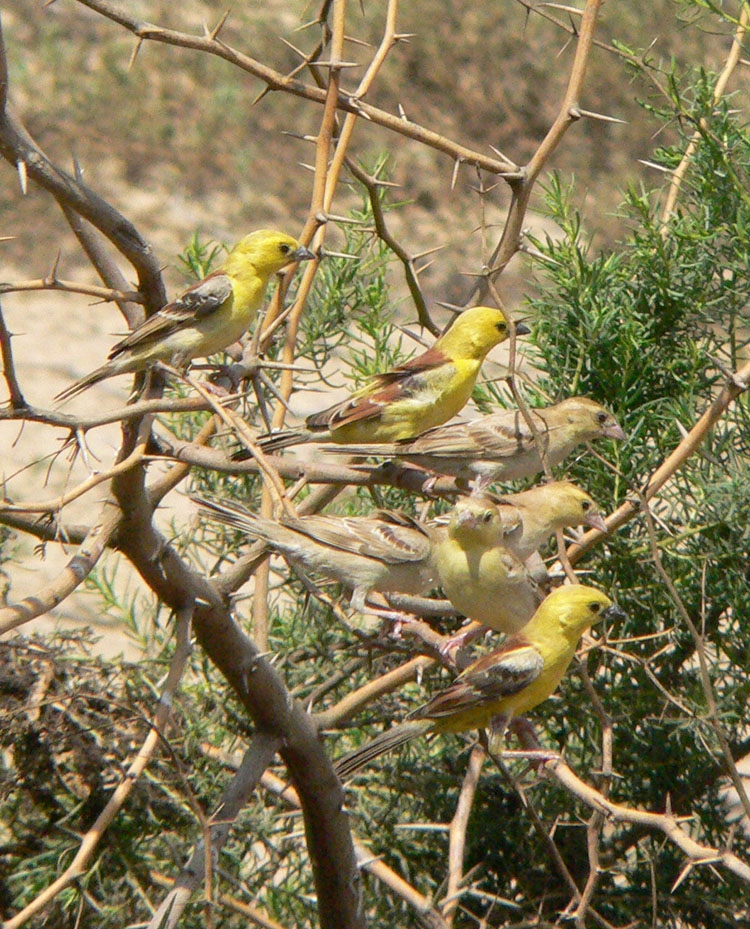
A flock of Sudan golden sparrows near the Red Sea in Sudan

Most of its members are found naturally in open habitats in the warmer climates of Africa and southern Eurasia. Evolutionary studies suggest the genus originated in Africa. Several species have adapted to human habitation, and this has enabled the house sparrow in particular, in close association with humans, to extend its Eurasian range well beyond what was probably its original home in the Middle East. Apart from this natural colonisation, the house sparrow has been introduced to many parts of the world outside its natural range, including the Americas, sub-Saharan Africa, and Australia. The Eurasian tree sparrow has also been artificially introduced on a smaller scale, with populations in Australia and locally in Missouri and Illinois in the United States.

== Behaviour ==
Passer sparrows build an untidy nest, which, depending on species and nest site availability, may be in a bush or tree, a natural hole in a tree, in a building or in thatch, or in the fabric of the nest of species such as the white stork. The clutch of up to eight eggs is incubated by both parents typically for 12–14 days, with another 14–24 more days to fledging.

Passer sparrows are primarily ground-feeding seed-eaters, though they also consume small insects especially when breeding. A few species, like the house sparrow and northern grey-headed sparrow scavenge for food around cities, and are almost omnivorous. Most Passer species are gregarious and will form substantial flocks.
