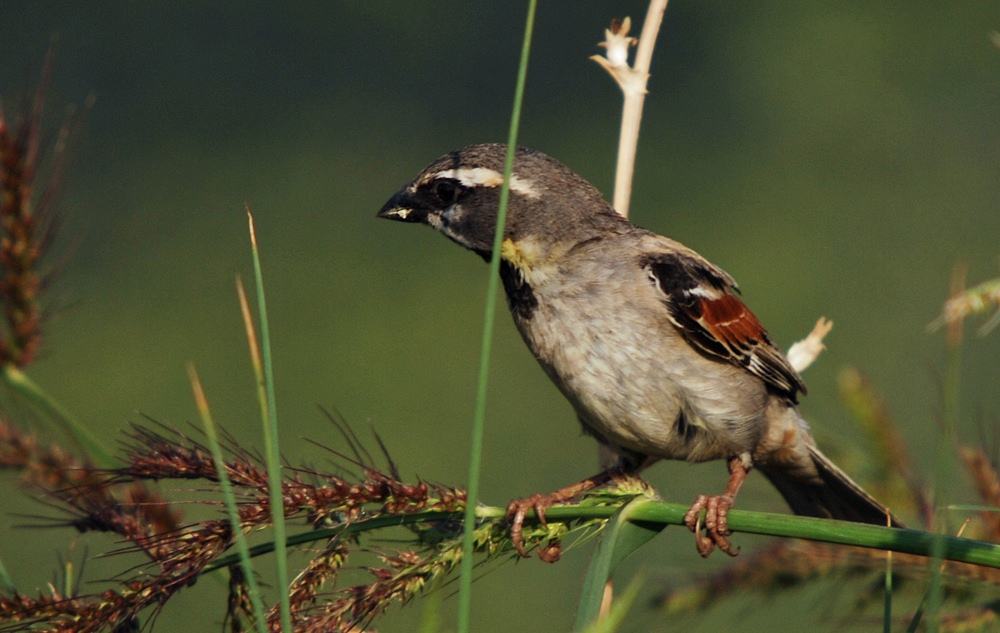

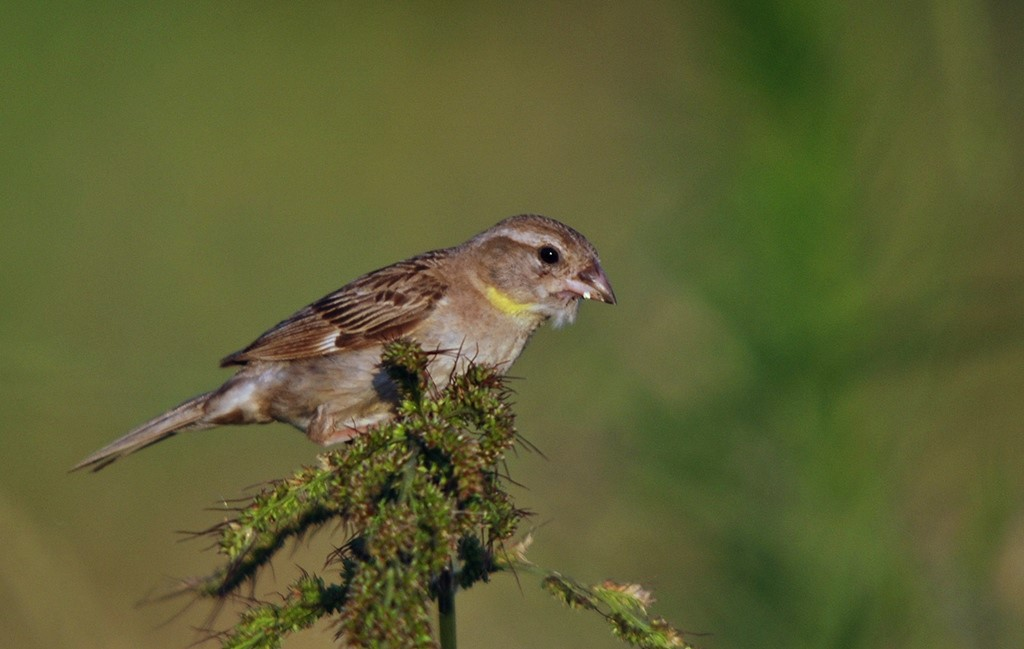
- Male (above) and female (below) in south-eastern Turkey

Conservation status
- Least Concern (IUCN 3.1)

Scientific classification
- Kingdom: Animalia
- Phylum: Chordata
- Class: Aves
- Order: Passeriformes
- Family: Passeridae
- Genus: Passer
- Species: P. moabiticus

Binomial name
- Passer moabiticus Tristram, 1864

Synonyms
- Passer mesopotamicus Zarudny, 1904

= Dead Sea sparrow =

Species of bird

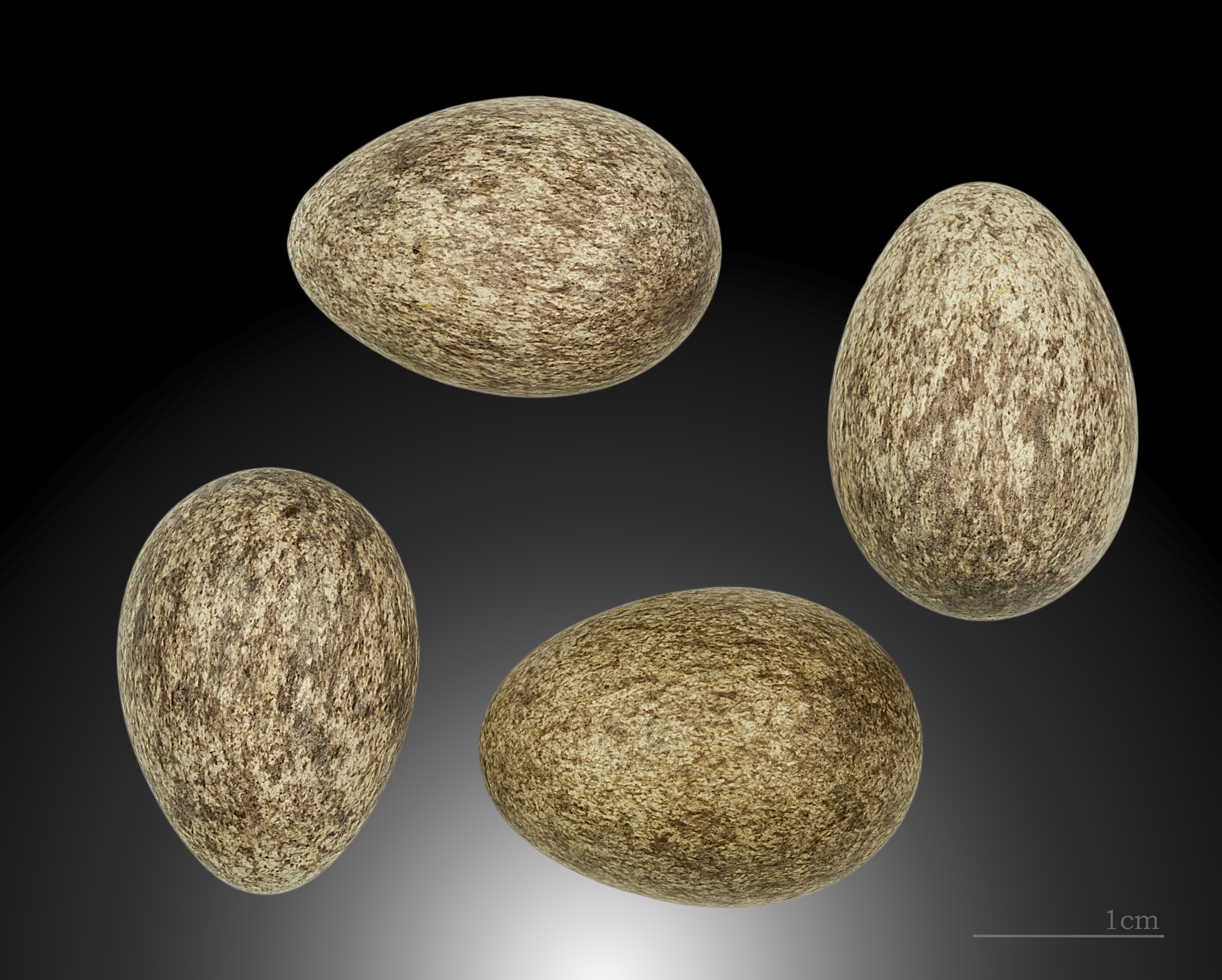
Eggs

The Dead Sea sparrow (Passer moabiticus) is a species of bird in the Old World sparrow family Passeridae, with one subspecies breeding in parts of the West Asia and another in western Afghanistan and eastern Iran. The eastern subspecies P. m. yatii is sometimes considered a separate species known as Yate's sparrow.

== Description ==
At 12–13 cm (4.7–5.1 in) long it is one of the smaller species of its family, some 4 cm (1.6 in) shorter than the widespread house sparrow. Like most of its relatives, it is sexually dimorphic with males being more brightly and distinctively marked than females.

The male Dead Sea sparrow has a grey crown, rear neck and cheeks, and a small black bib. It has a pale supercilium shading to buff at the rear, and yellow neck sides. The upperparts are dark-streaked reddish brown, and the underparts are grey-white.

The female looks like a small house sparrow, with a streaked brown back, greyish head and buff-white underparts. She is paler and smaller billed than the house sparrow, and sometimes shows yellow on the neck sides.

The eastern subspecies P. m. yatii is sandier, and the male has a yellow wash to the underparts.

The chirping song resembles those of house and Spanish sparrows, but is softer. The flight call is a high-pitched chi-wit. This species is often silent.

== Distribution and habitat ==
The range of this species is spotty in the Middle East, largely in corridors along the Jordan River and the Euphrates River, ranging from southern Turkey and Cyprus to the southwestern corner of Iran. The subspecies P. m. yatii breeds only in the Sistan region of southwestern Afghanistan and eastern Iran. While the species was initially recorded by scientists breeding only in a restricted range by the Dead Sea, hence the species' name, more populations were discovered further east and it expanded its known range over the second half of the 20th century. The species was first recorded on the island of Cyprus in 1973 and bred a few years later. Though changes to habitat reduced the size of this population soon after it is thought small numbers still breed in Cyprus. This species is migratory or dispersive away from its breeding season. The eastern subspecies winters in western Pakistan, but the regular wintering grounds of the western subspecies are largely unknown. Winter searches for the species near its western breeding range only find scattered flocks. It is possible they disperse widely in winter, as flocks have been found in winter further south and east than where they breed, including in the United Arab Emirates and Saudi Arabia.

Genetic analysis of birds in Israel revealed high connectivity among different populations indicating migration of individuals between these populations. However, despite this gene flow there is latitudinal variation in wing length and body mass, with individuals in the north of Israel having longer wings and being heavier than those in the south suggesting local adaption in accordance with Bergmann's rule.

== Behaviour ==
Their flight call is higher pitched than that of larger species of sparrow. They breed in thick scrubs where they build large nests that have thermoregulating properties for their hot climate. They're partial short distance migrants that move in tight, fast moving flocks.

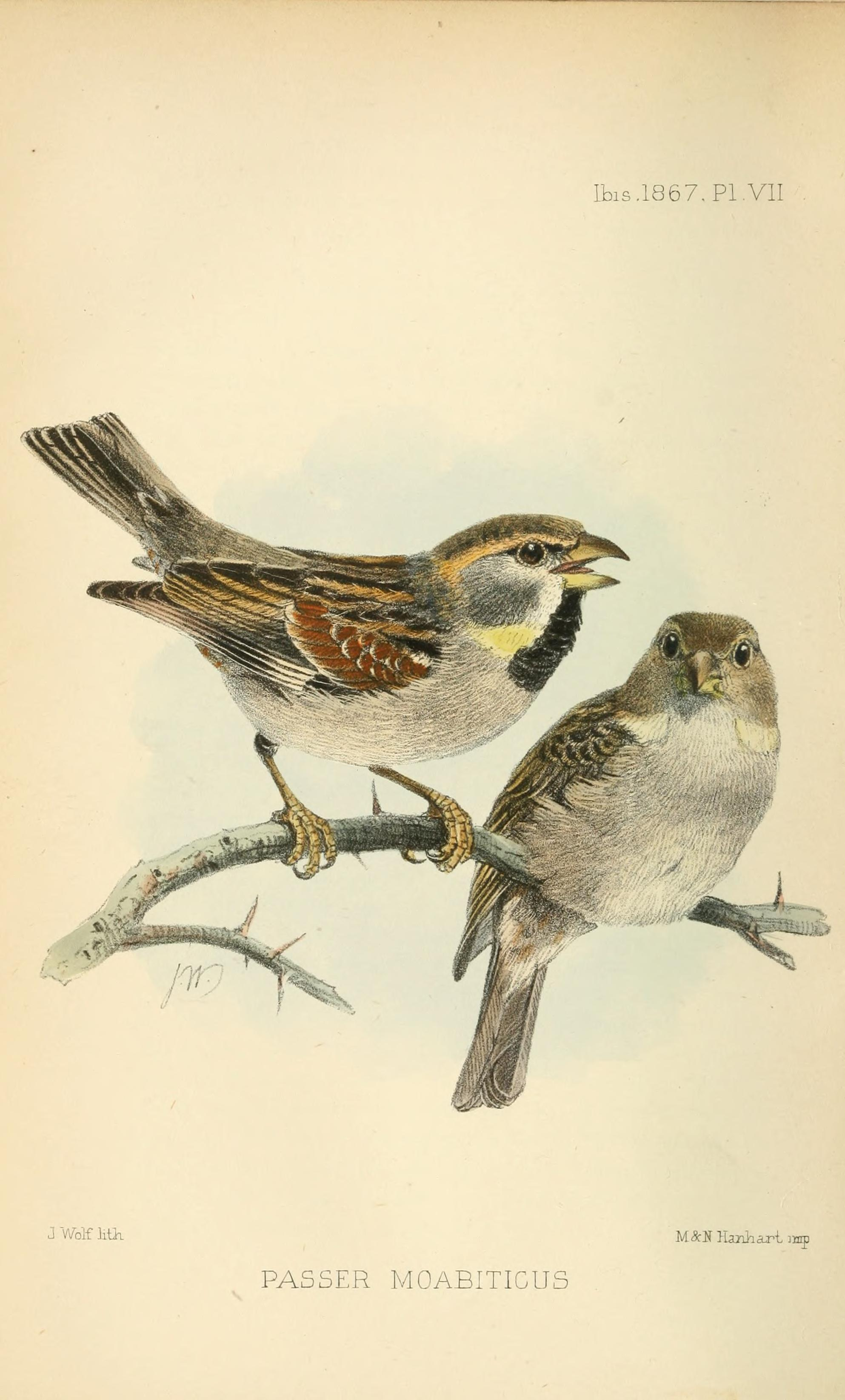
two dead sea sparrow one male and one female
