= J. Denis Summers-Smith =

British engineer and ornithologist (1920–2020)

- Born: 25 October 1920; Glasgow, Lanarkshire
- Died: 5 May 2020 (aged 99)
- Known for: Research on sparrows, books on tribology
- Awards: Tribology Silver Medal (1975); Stamford Raffles Award
- Scientific career
- Fields: Ornithology; Tribology
- Workplaces: Imperial Chemical Industries

James Denis Summers-Smith (25 October 1920 – 5 May 2020) was a British ornithologist and mechanical engineer, a specialist both in sparrows and in industrial tribology.

== Early life ==
Summers-Smith was raised in Glasgow, where he was born in 1920. He spent childhood holidays in County Donegal, in northwestern Ireland, where one of his uncles, a country parson and a naturalist, taught him about birds. For nearly six years of World War II, Summers-Smith was an intelligence officer in the British Army. He received his commission in 1940, and reached the rank of captain. He served with the 9th Battalion, The Cameronians, stationed on the east coast of England. During that time he had little time for birdwatching, except when surveying "such likely spots for invasion" as coastal marshes in Suffolk. Summers-Smith was among the second wave of troops involved in the D-Day landings of 6 June 1944. He was badly wounded in a later action in Normandy, as a result of which he spent 18 months in hospital.

== Career ==
After the war, Summers-Smith was employed as a mechanical engineer by Imperial Chemical Industries. He obtained several degrees in engineering around this time, and a PhD in physics in 1953. In 1975, Summers-Smith received one of the three annual Tribology Silver Medals given by the Institution of Mechanical Engineers. His job as an engineer allowed him to travel widely, and he used trips abroad as opportunities to study sparrows.

=== Ornithology ===
Summers-Smith began his study of the house sparrow in 1947. He decided to make a serious study of a particular bird species, and chose the house sparrow because of the difficulty of travel at the time, under post-war rationing. Summers-Smith has studied the house sparrow in Highclere, Hampshire; in Hartburn, County Durham; and latterly at Guisborough in North Yorkshire, where he settled in 1961. During these studies, he was questioned by a policeman on the street twice for looking around yards with binoculars at early hours. Summers-Smith was a founding member of his local bird club (The Teesmouth Bird Club) in 1960, and he wrote the instructions for the British Trust for Ornithology's first Common Bird Census in 1962. His study of the house sparrow resulted not only in a number of papers in respected journals, but also in his 1963 monograph The House Sparrow, published as part of the New Naturalist Monographs series. After The House Sparrow was published, Summers-Smith began studying the house sparrow's relatives in the genus Passer. Over the course of these studies, he visited dozens of countries, and made observations on all the Passer species (recognised in his classification) except the Socotra sparrow. This research into the sparrows as a whole resulted in a monograph on the genus Passer, published in 1988 as The Sparrows, and one on the Eurasian tree sparrow, the 1995 The Tree Sparrow, both of which were illustrated by Robert Gillmor. He also wrote In Search of Sparrows, an account of his worldwide travels researching sparrows. In 1992, Summers-Smith received the Zoological Society of London's Stamford Raffles Award, for his "world-renowned work on sparrows".

In The House Sparrow, Summers-Smith predicted that the house sparrow would have "a bright future", but instead it went into a severe decline in many parts of the world, beginning in the 1970s. Summers-Smith studied this decline extensively, but he called it "one of the most remarkable wildlife mysteries of the last fifty years". When The Independent offered a £5,000 prize for an explanation of the decline of the house sparrow in 2000, Summers-Smith acted as a referee. In 2008, the prize was almost awarded to Dr. Kate Vincent of De Montfort University and several colleagues, who attributed the decline of the house sparrow to falling insect numbers.

In 2009, Summers-Smith was the author of the section of the Handbook of the Birds of the World on the family Passeridae.

== Bibliography ==
- The House Sparrow, 1963
- Introduction to Tribology in Industry, 1970
- Tribology Problems in Process Industries, 1970
- Granivorous Birds in the Agricultural Landscape, 1980 (editor)
- The Sparrows: a Study of the Genus Passer, pub. T. & A.D. Poyser, 1988, ISBN 0-85661-048-8
- In Search of Sparrows, 1992
- An Introductory Guide to Industrial Tribology, 1994
- The Tree Sparrow, 1995
- A Tribology Casebook: a Lifetime in Tribology, 1997
- Mechanical Seal Practice for Improved Performance, 2002 (editor)
- On Sparrows and Man: a Love-Hate Relationship, 2006
- "Family Passeridae (Old World Sparrows)" in Handbook of the Birds of the World, volume 14, 2009
