= Eitan Tchernov =

Israeli palaeontologist

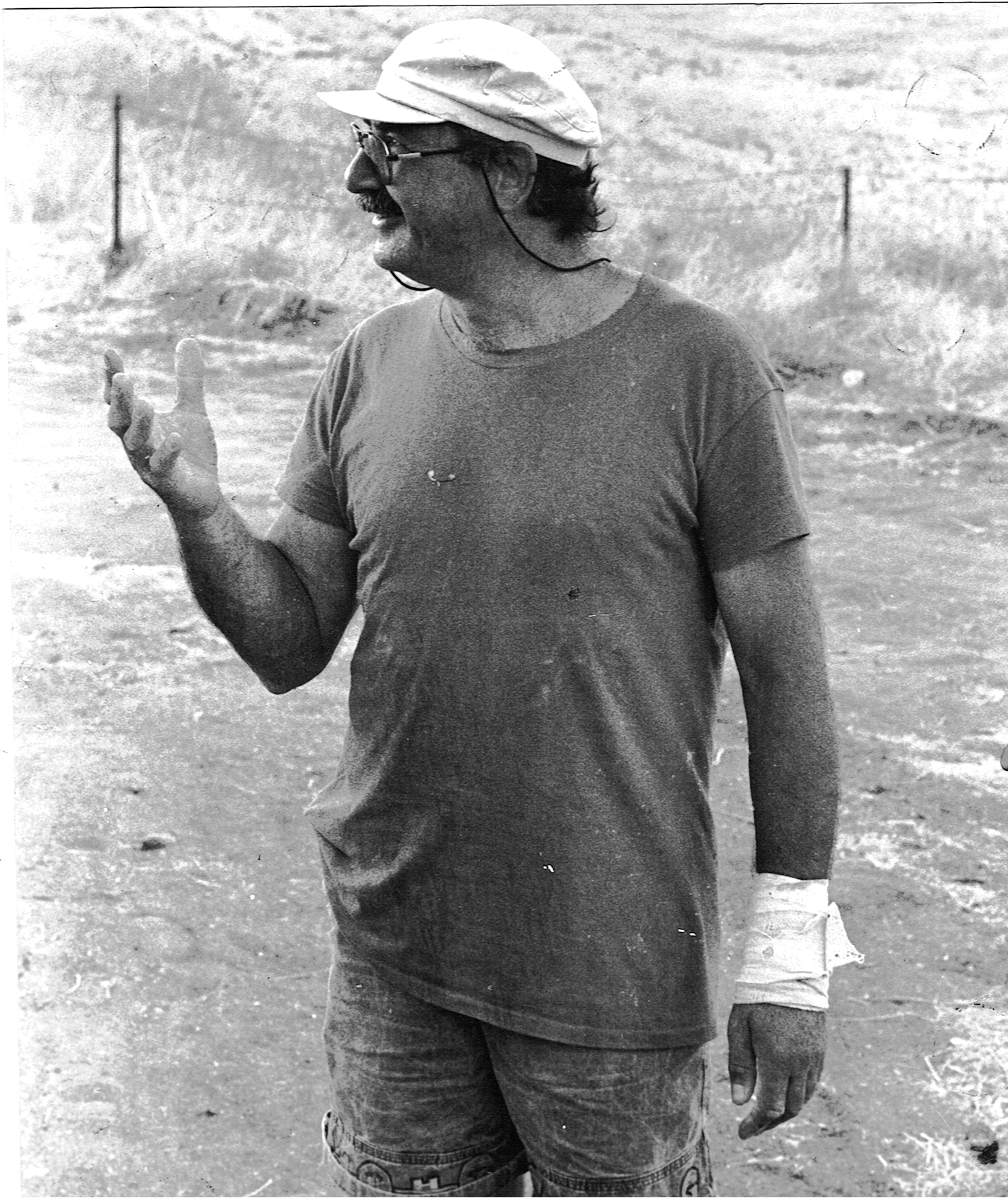

Eitan Tchernov (Hebrew: איתן טשרנוב; 1935 – December 13, 2002) was an author and professor of biology at the Hebrew University of Jerusalem. Tchernov was born in Tel Aviv, Israel, and received a PhD from the Hebrew University of Jerusalem in 1966. He chaired the Center for the Study & Management of the Environment in 1980 and the High Professional Committee of the Authority of Nature Reserves from 1979 to 1982.

In 1991, he founded the Department of Evolution, Systematics and Ecology at the Alexander Silberman Institute of Life Sciences in the Hebrew University of Jerusalem and was its first chairman. He was also involved in establishing the Israel Nature Reserves Authority, was its first ranger and later a member of its scientific advisory board. He was on the board of the Society for the Protection of Nature and on other nature conservation boards including the UNESCO-MAB committee (Man and the Biosphere) and Scientific Committee on Problems of the Environment (SCOPE). He was co-editor of the Hebrew environmental magazine Sevivot from 1986 to 2002.

== Legacy ==
Tchernov is commemorated in the scientific name of a species of snake, Micrelaps tchernovi.

== Books ==
- An Early Neolithic Village in the Jordan Valley, Part II: The Fauna of Netiv Hagdud, 2004
- Structure, Function and Evolution of Teeth, 1992
