= Rufous sparrow =

The rufous sparrows are closely related birds, sometimes considered to be the same species:

- Great sparrow
- Kenya sparrow
- Shelley's sparrow
- Kordofan sparrow
- Socotra sparrow
- Iago sparrow

== See also ==
- Rufous-backed sparrow (disambiguation)
- Rufous-crowned sparrow
- Russet sparrow
