= Snowfinch =

Snowfinches are a natural group of small passerine birds in the sparrow family Passeridae. At one time all eight species were placed in the genus Montifringilla but they are now divided into three genera:

- Montifringilla (3 species)
  - In Europe, the name snowfinch is sometimes used for the white-winged snowfinch specifically
- Pyrgilauda (4 species)
- White-rumped snowfinch, Onychostruthus taczanowskii
