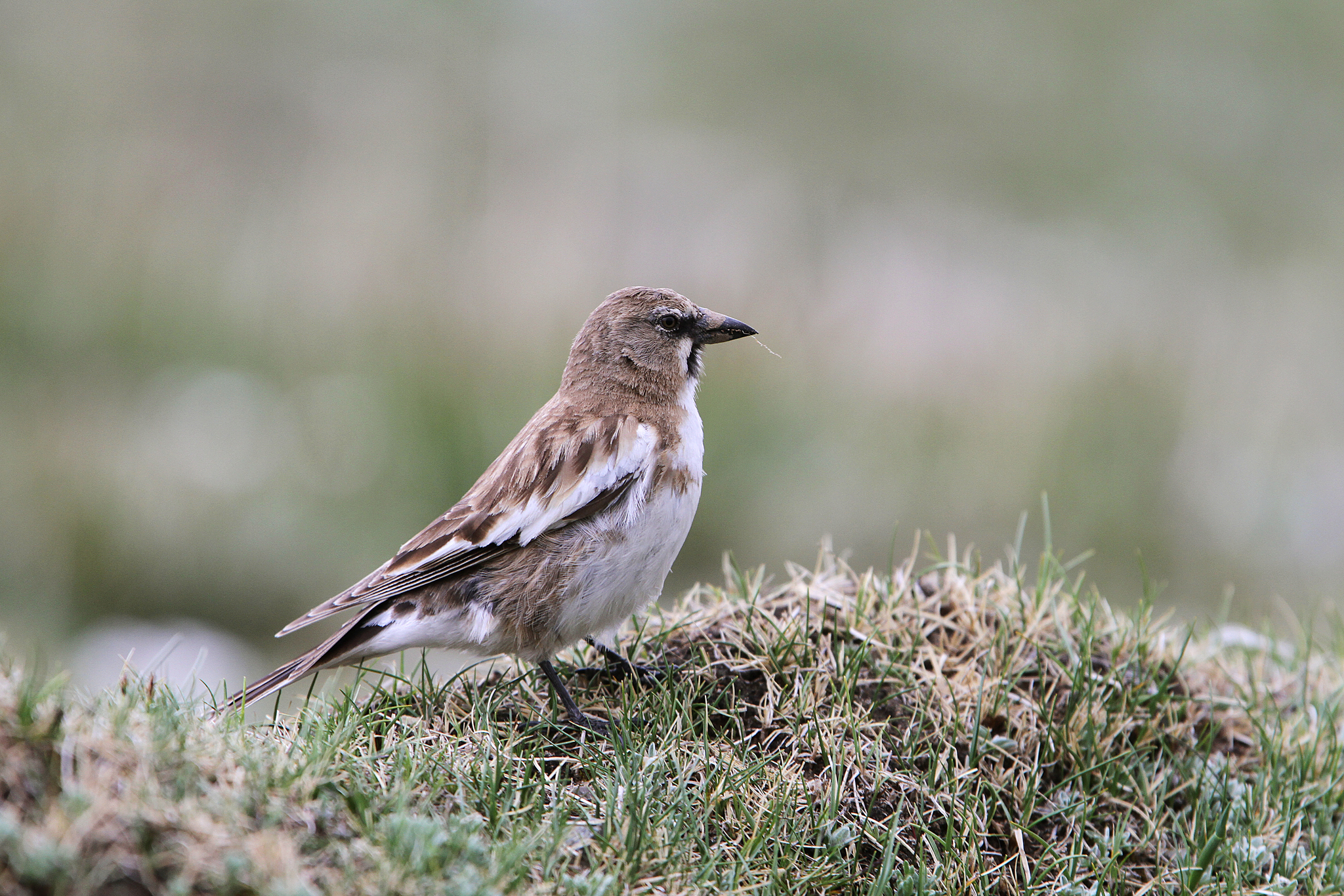

Conservation status
- Least Concern (IUCN 3.1)

Scientific classification
- Kingdom: Animalia
- Phylum: Chordata
- Class: Aves
- Order: Passeriformes
- Family: Passeridae
- Genus: Montifringilla
- Species: M. henrici

Binomial name
- Montifringilla henrici (Oustalet, 1892)

= Tibetan snowfinch =

Species of bird

The Tibetan snowfinch or Henri's snowfinch (Montifringilla henrici) is a species of bird in the sparrow family.

It is found in Tibet. It's natural habitat is high altitude dry shrubland. It is sometimes considered a subspecies of the white-winged snowfinch
