= Chromosome 5 open reading frame 47 =

Protein found in humans

C5orf47

Identifiers
- Aliases: C5orf47, chromosome 5 open reading frame 47
- External IDs: MGI: 1914842; HomoloGene: 12161; GeneCards: C5orf47; OMA:C5orf47 - orthologs

Gene location (Human)
Chr.	Chromosome 5 (human)
Band	5q35.2	Start	173,973,779 bp
Band	5q35.2	End	174,006,140 bp

Gene location (Mouse)
Chr.	Chromosome 11 (mouse)
Band	11|11 A4	Start	31,915,592 bp
Band	11|11 A4	End	31,929,651 bp
RNA expression pattern
Bgee	Human / Mouse (ortholog); Top expressed in: gonad; right testis; left testis; secondary oocyte; testicle; buccal mucosa cell; sperm; Brodmann area 9; anterior cingulate cortex; prefrontal cortex / Top expressed in: spermatocyte; spermatid; morula; embryo; embryo; seminiferous tubule; ovary; major salivary gland; submandibular gland; gastrula; More reference expression data
BioGPS	n/a
Orthologs
Species	Human	Mouse
Entrez	133491	67592
Ensembl	ENSG00000185056	ENSMUSG00000020299
UniProt	Q569G3	Q24JP4
RefSeq (mRNA)	NM_001144954	NM_026262
RefSeq (protein)	NP_001138426	NP_080538
Location (UCSC)	Chr 5: 173.97 – 174.01 Mb	Chr 11: 31.92 – 31.93 Mb
PubMed search
- Wikidata
View/Edit Human	View/Edit Mouse

Chromosome 5 Open Reading Frame 47, or C5ORF47, is a protein which, in humans, is encoded by the C5ORF47 gene. It also goes by the alias LOC133491. The human C5ORF47 gene is primarily expressed in the testis.

== Gene ==
C5ORF47 is located at 5q35.2. The full gene spans 16,911 nucleotides, and the mRNA transcript, made up of 5 exons, spans 2511 nucleotides.

=== Gene expression ===
Human C5ORF47 is primarily expressed in the testis, as well as expressed in low levels in many tissues - stomach, lung, kidney, intestine, heart, and adrenal - in varying levels and times throughout fetal development.

== Transcript ==
The mRNA sequence of C5ORF47 is 2511 nucleotides long and consists of 5 exons and 6 introns

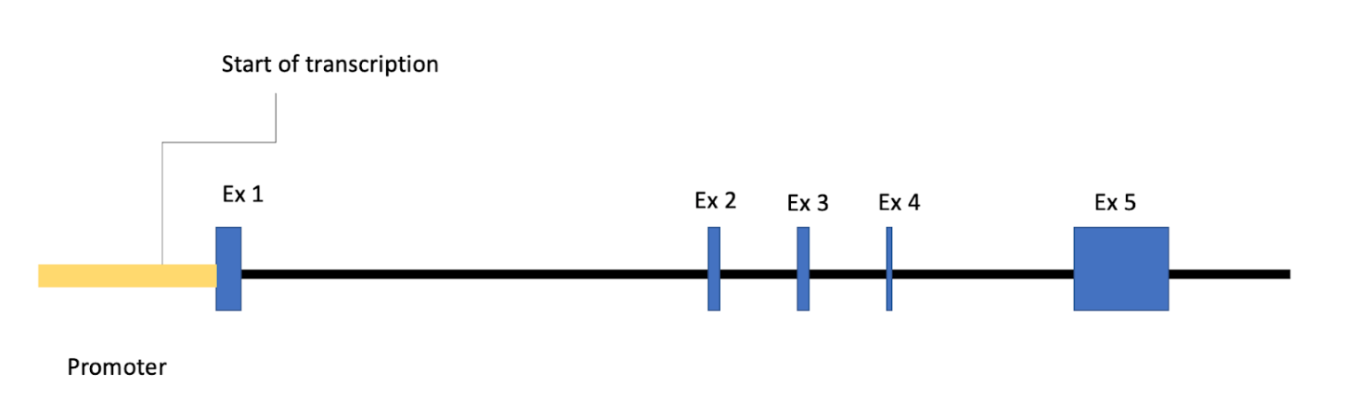
Bird's eye view of human C5ORF47 promoter and gene. The promoter, start of transcription, and exons 1-5 are labeled.

The human C5ORF47 gene has two known isoforms, the first (XP_016864517.1) encodes a protein that is 176 amino acids in length, and the second (XP_011532733.1) encodes a protein that is 150 amino acids in length. This article will primarily focus on the first, more common isoform.

== Protein ==
The molecular weight of the unmodified precursor human C5ORF47 protein is 19.2 kDal, and the isoelectric point is predicted to be 10.49.

The protein is basic and appears to have a relatively high concentration of positively charged amino acids, lysine and arginine, in comparison to negatively charged amino acids, aspartic acid and glutamic acid. The repetitive amino acid structure, “SQLR”, can be found in two locations in the protein.

=== Domains ===
The human C5ORF47 protein contains DUF4680, a Domain of Unknown Function, that is characterized by two conserved amino acid sequence motifs: VISRM and ENE.

=== Structure ===
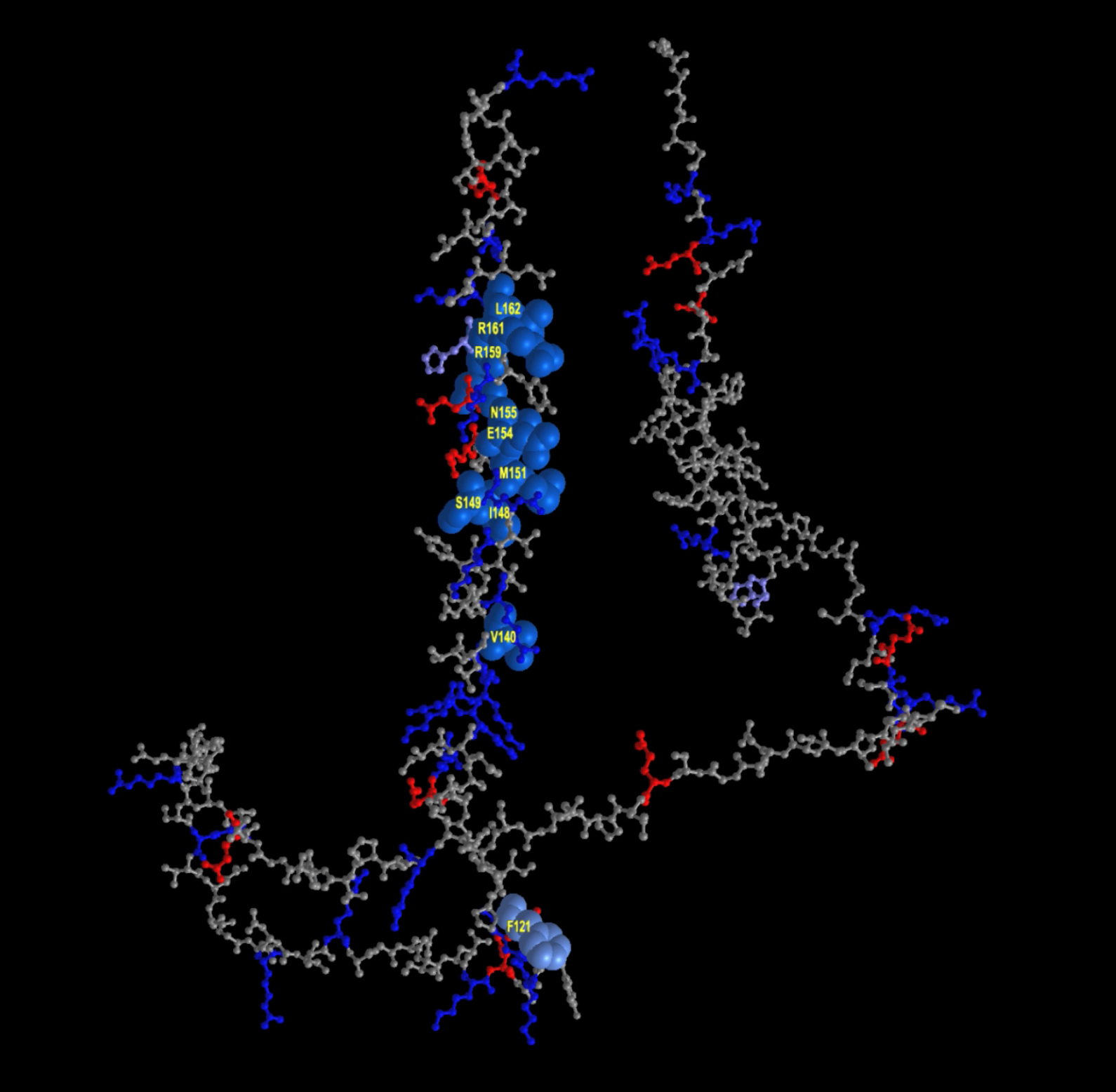
Predicted tertiary structure of C5ORF47 protein. The 10 most conserved amino acids are labeled in yellow.

Within the predicted tertiary structure of C5ORF47, the most conserved amino acids fall within the Domain of Unknown Function: DUF4680.

=== Cellular Localization ===
The human C5ORF47 protein is predicted to be localized in the nucleus.

A stretch of five positively charged lysines, indicating a nuclear localization sequence, can be found at positions 133-137 of the amino acid sequence.

Immunohistochemical staining of human testis from Sigma Aldrich shows moderate nuclear positivity in cells in seminiferous ducts of the testes.

=== Post-Translational Modifications ===
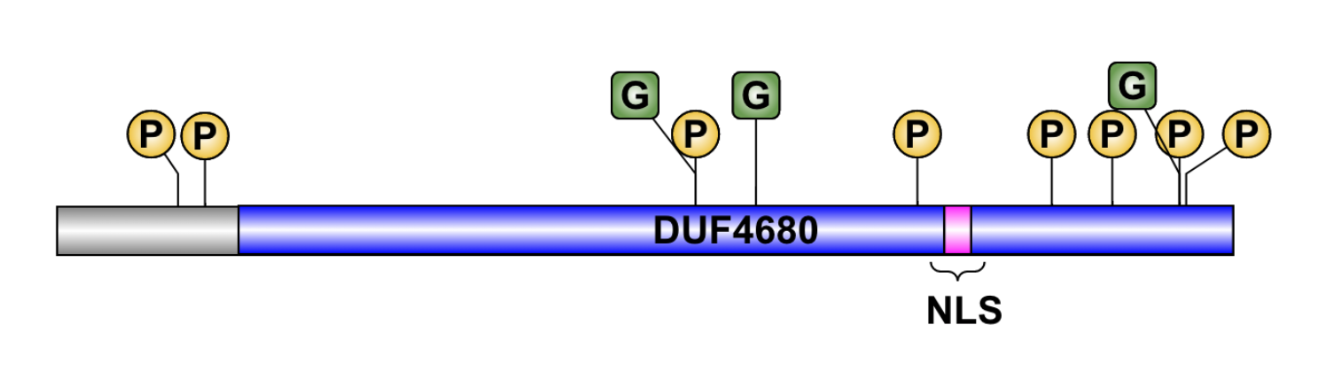
Human C5ORF47 protein diagram depicting DUF4680 highlighted in blue, nuclear localization sequence highlighted in pink, conserved phosphorylation sites denoted by yellow circles, and conserved O-linked glycosylation sites denoted by green squares.

Predicted phosphorylation sites T19, S23, S96, S129, S149, Y158, S168, S169, and O-linked glycosylation sites S96, S105, and S168 are conserved among most mammalian orthologs.

== Homology ==
Conceptual translation of C5ORF47 coding sequence.The exon boundaries are defined in blue. A domain of unknown function is identified with brackets. A disordered region is shown in gray. Poly A signals poly A sites are shown in yellow. Ten most conserved amino acids are bolded. Eight most conserved phosphorylation sites are highlighted in gold. Repeat sequences are highlighted in green. FxxP domain is highlighted in purple. The Nuclear Localization Sequence is highlighted in pink. The underlined segments refer to the two conserved amino acid sequence motifs that characterize DUF4680.

Orthologs of the human C5ORF47 gene can be found in mammals, birds, and reptiles, but not in amphibians, fish, or invertebrates. No paralogs of the human C5ORF47 gene are known.

	Taxonomic Order	Genus and species	Common name	Median Date of Divergence (MYA)	Sequence length	Sequence identity to human protein (%)	Sequence similarity to human protein (%)
**Mammalia**	Primates	Homo sapiens	Human	0	176	100	100
	Primates	Gorilla gorilla	Gorilla	8.6	176	97.7	98
	Rodentia	Mus musculus	House Mouse	87	165	50	63.1
	Chiroptera	Pteropus giganteus	Indian flying fox	94	176	58	64.9
	Carnivora	Neomonachus schauinslandi	Hawaiian monk seal	94	178	56.7	63.9
**Aves**	Passeriforme	Onychostruthus taczanowskii	White-rumped snowfinch	319	173	33.2	42.8
	Casuariiforme	Dromaius novaehollandiae	Emu	319	182	32	44.5
	Passeriformes	Taeniopygia guttata	Zebra Finch	319	177	30.8	39.3
	Apterygiforme	Apteryx rowi	Okarito Kiwi	319	180	30.5	41
	Caprimulgiformes	Antrostomus carolinensis	Chuck-will's-widow	319	229	26.8	37
	Apodiformes	Calypte anna	Anna's humming bird	319	228	24	35.6
	Galliformes	Phasianus colchicus	Ring-necked Pheasant	319	263	20.5	30.9
**Reptilia**	Squamata	Zootoca vivipara	Viparous Lizard	319	205	30	42.3
	Squamata	Podarcis muralis	Common wall lizard	319	243	28.9	39.9
	Testudines	Dermochelys coriacea	Leatherback sea turtle	319	242	27.6	41.3
	Testudines	Gopherus flavomarginatus	Bolson Tortoise	319	235	26.6	38.1
	Testudines	Chelonoidis abingdonii	Pinta Island tortoise	319	234	26.6	35.5
	Squamata	Sceloporus undulatus	Eastern fence lizard	319	241	24.7	34.9
	Crocodilia	Alligator mississippiensis	American Alligator	319	307	22.8	32.2

== Interacting Proteins ==
Proteins that are predicted to interact with the human C5ORF47 protein tend have characteristics such as testes-specific, pertaining to sperm or spermatogenesis, or related to cilia/flagella formation.

Interacting Protein	Full Name	Cellular Compartment	Function
CCDC185	Coiled-coil domain-containing protein 185	Cellular localization unknown	Has a role in ciliogenesis (by similarity). Required for proper cephalic and left/right axis development
C10orf120	Uncharacterized protein C10orf120	Cellular localization unknown	Diseases associated with C10orf120 include Vas Deferens, Congenital Bilateral Aplasia which occurs in males when the tubes that carry sperm out of the testes (the vas deferens) fail to develop properly.
C4orf22	Uncharacterized protein C4orf22	Predicted to be located in cytoplasm.	Cilia and flagella associated protein.
TGIF2LX	Tgfb induced factor homeobox 2 like, x-linked; Homeobox protein TGIF2LX	Predicted to be located in the nucleus	May have a transcription role in testis. Testis-specific expression suggests that this gene may play a role in spermatogenesis.
ZPLD1	Zona pellucida-like domain-containing protein 1	Predicted to be an extracellular matrix structural constituent.; Predicted to be located in cytoplasmic vesicle membrane.; Predicted to be integral component of membrane.; Predicted to be active in cell surface and extracellular space	Glycoprotein which is a component of the gelatinous extracellular matrix in the cupulae of the vestibular organ
SPERT	Spermatid-associated protein	Predicted to be located in cytoplasmic vesicle.	Enables identical protein binding activity.
ZNF606	Zinc finger protein 606	Predicted to be located in the nucleus	Nuclear protein that can act as a transcriptional repressor of growth factor-mediated signaling pathways. Reduced expression of this gene promotes chondrocyte differentiation
C3orf20	Uncharacterized protein C3orf20	Predicted to be located in cytoplasm.	Unknown function
C14orf119	Uncharacterized protein C14orf119	Located in cytosol and mitochondria.	Unknown function

== Clinical Significance ==
In a study conducted to identify rare genetic variants contributing to Neuromyelitis optica in Finland, Four missense variants were shared by two patients in C3ORF20, PDZD2, C5ORF47 and ZNF606.

Microarray data shows that human C5ORF47 expression is low in an individual with teratozoospermia, which is characterized by the presence of spermatozoa with abnormal morphology over 85% in sperm.

Microarray data shows that human C5ORF47 expression is lower in p63 depleted cells. The p63 protein functions as a transcription factor that helps regulate numerous cell activities, including cell proliferation, cell maintenance, differentiation, cell adhesion, and apoptosis. The p63 protein also plays a critical role in the formation of ectodermal structures in early development. Studies suggest that it also plays essential roles in the development of the limbs, facial features, urinary system, and other organs and tissues.
