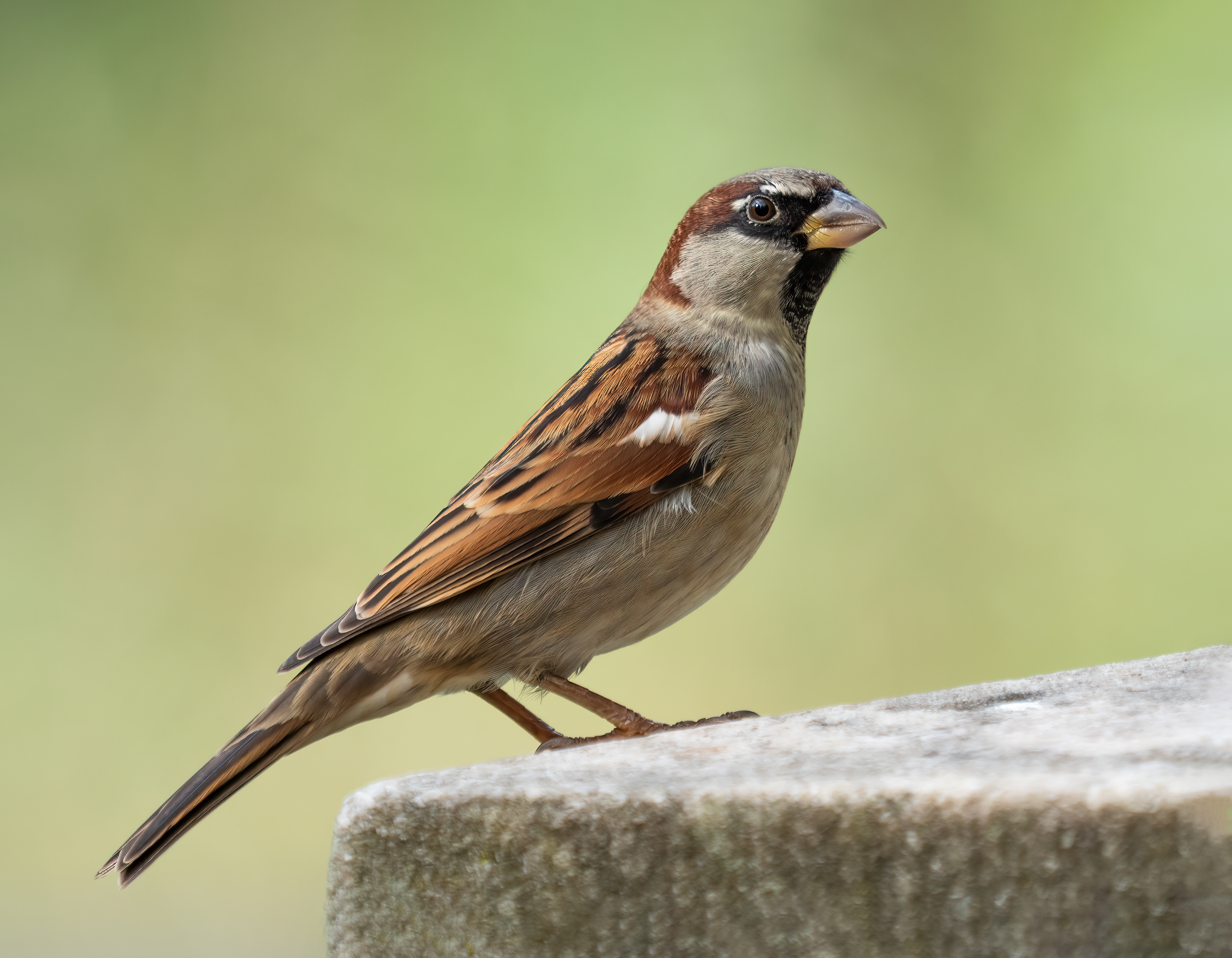
- Male house sparrow (Passer domesticus)

Scientific classification
- Kingdom: Animalia
- Phylum: Chordata
- Class: Aves
- Order: Passeriformes
- Suborder: Passeri
- Infraorder: Passerides
- Parvorder: Passerida
- Family: Passeridae; Rafinesque, 1815

Type genus
- Passer Brisson, 1760

Genera
- Hypocryptadius; Carpospiza; Petronia; Onychostruthus; Montifringilla; Pyrgilauda; Gymnoris; Passer

= Old World sparrow =

Family of songbirds

Old World sparrows are groups of small passerine birds forming the family Passeridae. They are also known as true sparrows, a name which is also used for a particular genus of the family Passer. They are distinct from both the New World sparrows of the family Passerellidae and from a few other birds such as the Java sparrow of the family Estrildidae sharing their name. Many species nest on buildings and the house sparrow and Eurasian tree sparrows, in particular, inhabit cities in large numbers. They are primarily seed-eaters, though they also consume small insects. Some species scavenge for food around cities and like pigeons or gulls, will eat small quantities of a diversity of items.

== Description ==
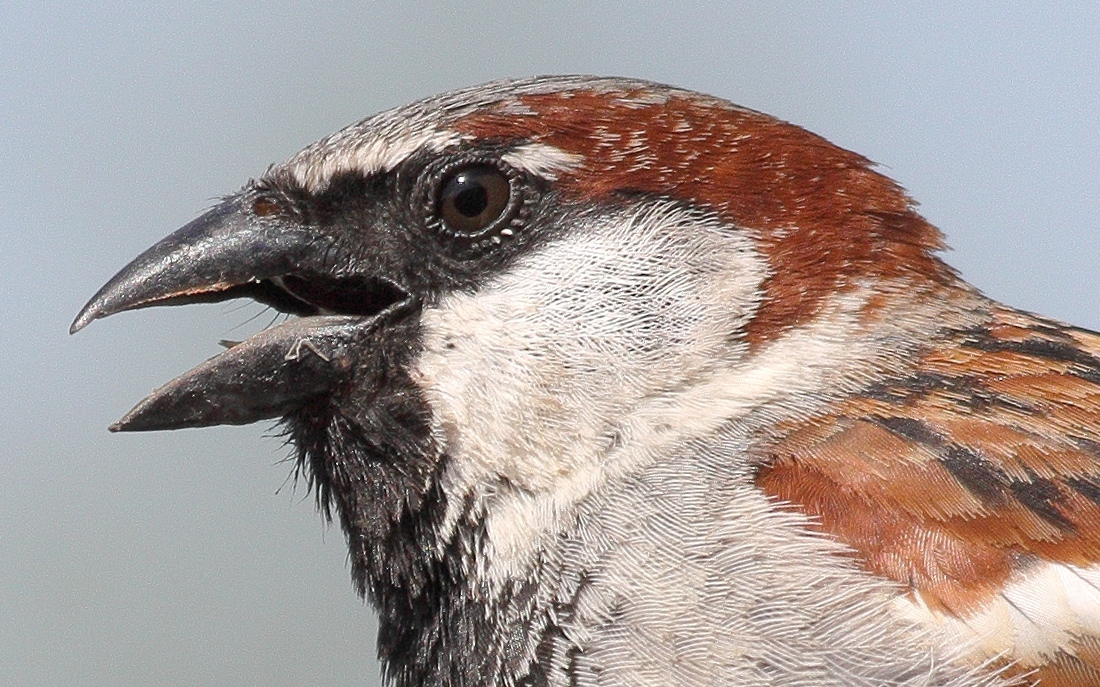
Male house sparrow in Germany

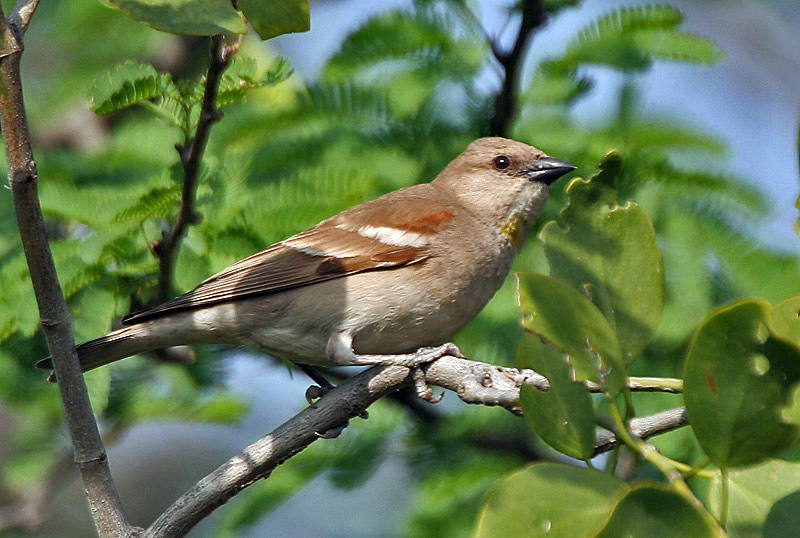
Yellow-throated sparrow at Keoladeo National Park, India

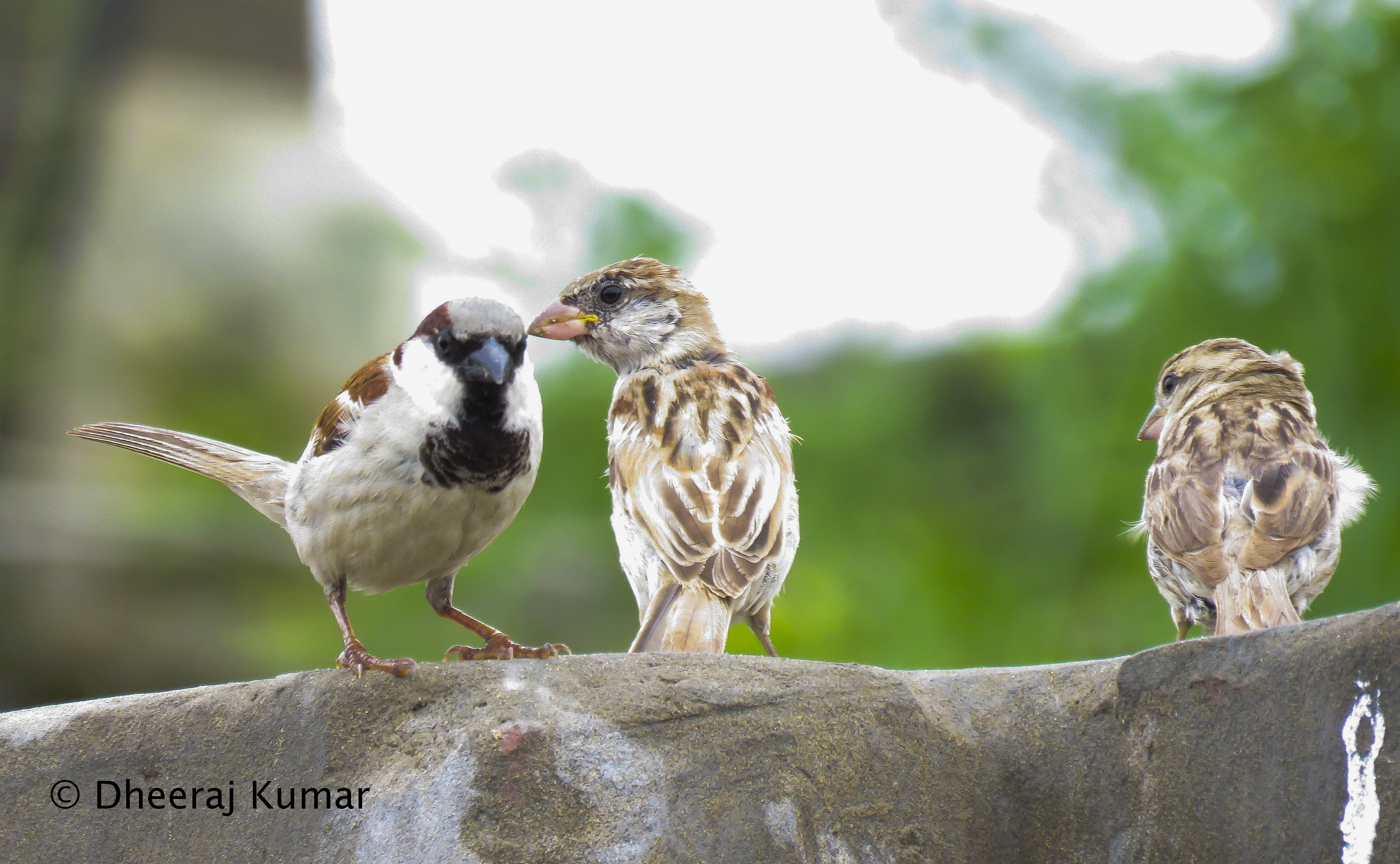
Sparrow in Tharparkar, Sindh

Generally, Old World sparrows are small, plump, brown and grey birds with short tails and stubby, powerful beaks. The differences between sparrow species can be subtle. Members of this family range in size from the chestnut sparrow (Passer eminibey), at 11.4 centimetres (4.5 in) and 13.4 grams (0.47 oz), to the parrot-billed sparrow (Passer gongonensis), at 18 centimetres (7.1 in) and 42 grams (1.5 oz). Sparrows are physically similar to other seed-eating birds, such as finches, but have a vestigial dorsal outer primary wing feather and an extra bone in the tongue. This bone, the preglossale, helps stiffen the tongue when holding seeds. Other adaptations for eating seeds are specialised bills and elongated and specialised alimentary canals.

== Taxonomy and systematics ==
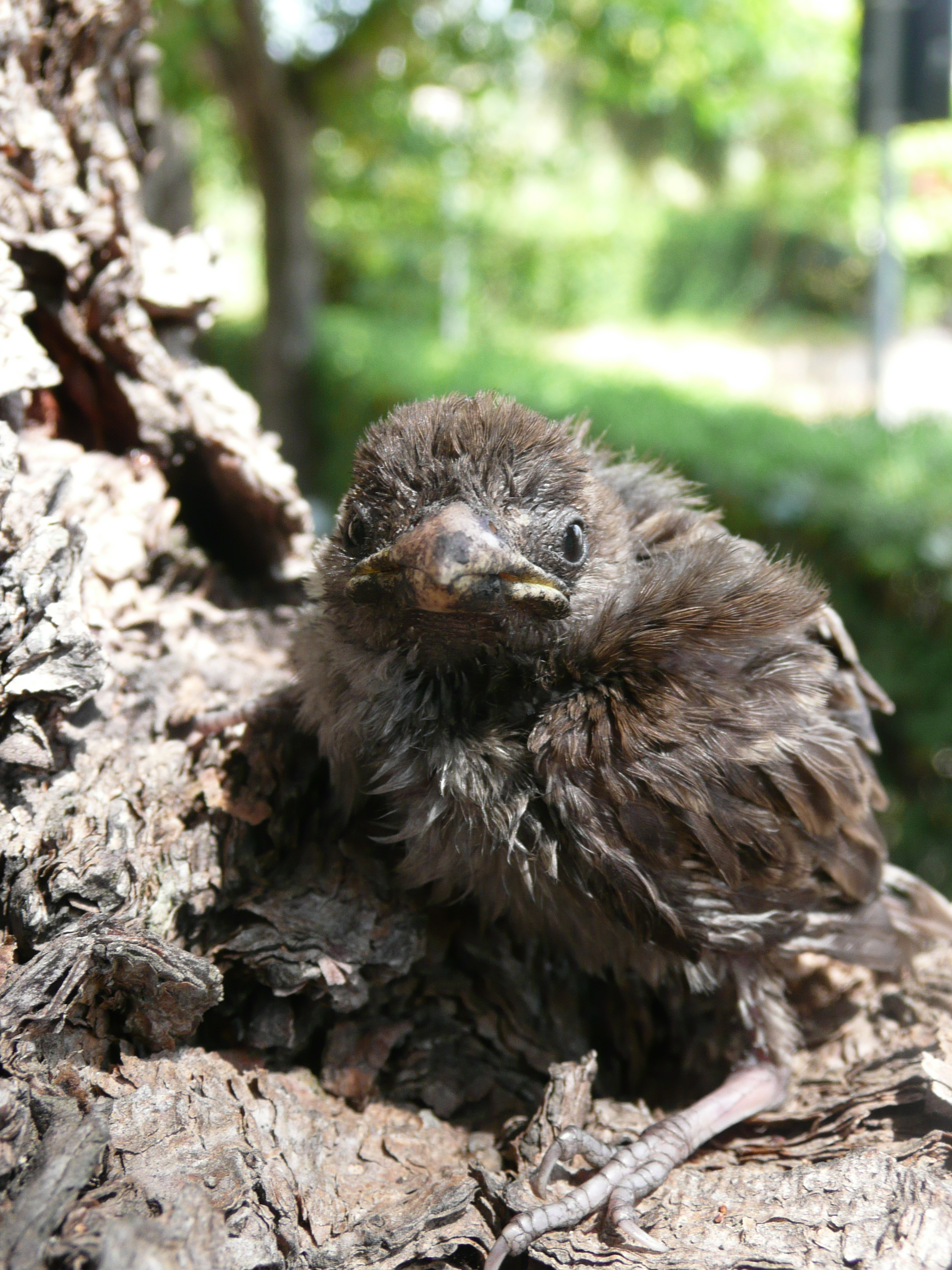
A sparrow chick

The family Passeridae was introduced (as Passernia) by the French polymath Constantine Samuel Rafinesque in 1815. Under the classification used in the Handbook of the Birds of the World (HBW) main groupings of the sparrows are the true sparrows (genus Passer), the snowfinches (typically one genus, Montifringilla), and the rock sparrows (Petronia and the pale rockfinch). These groups are similar to each other, and are each fairly homogeneous, especially Passer. Some classifications also include the sparrow-weavers (Plocepasser) and several other African genera (otherwise classified among the weavers, Ploceidae) which are morphologically similar to Passer. According to a study of molecular and skeletal evidence by Jon Fjeldså and colleagues, the cinnamon ibon of the Philippines, previously considered to be a white-eye, is a sister taxon to the sparrows as defined by the HBW. They therefore classify it as its own subfamily within Passeridae.

Many early classifications of the Old World sparrows placed them as close relatives of the weavers among the various families of small seed-eating birds, based on the similarity of their breeding behaviour, bill structure, and moult, among other characters. Some, starting with P. P. Suskin in the 1920s, placed the sparrows in the weaver family as the subfamily Passerinae, and tied them to Plocepasser. Another family sparrows were classed with was the finches (Fringillidae).

Some authorities previously classified the related estrildid finches of the Old World tropics and Australasia as members of the Passeridae. Like sparrows, the estrildid finches are small, gregarious and often colonial seed-eaters with short, thick, but pointed bills. They are broadly similar in structure and habits, but tend to be very colourful and vary greatly in their plumage. The 2008 Christidis and Boles taxonomic scheme lists the estrildid finches as the separate family Estrildidae, leaving just the true sparrows in Passeridae.

Despite some resemblance such as the seed-eater's bill and frequently well-marked heads, New World sparrows are members of a different family, Passerellidae, with 29 genera recognised. Several species in this family are notable singers. New World sparrows are related to Old World buntings, and until 2017, were included in the Old World bunting family Emberizidae. The hedge sparrow or dunnock (Prunella modularis) is similarly unrelated. It is a sparrow in name only, a relict of the old practice of calling more types of small birds "sparrows". A few further bird species are also called sparrows, such as the Java sparrow, an estrildid finch.

- Passeridae
  - - - Gymnoris – 4 species
      - Passer – 28 species
    - - Petronia – rock sparrow
      - - Onychostruthus – white-rumped snowfinch
        - - Montifringilla – 3 species
          - Pyrgilauda – 4 species

Phylogeny based on a study by Martin Päckert and colleagues published in 2021. The monotypic genera Carpospiza and Hypocryptadius were not sampled.

=== Species ===
The family contains 43 species divided into eight genera:

Image	Genus	Living species
	Hypocryptadius	Cinnamon ibon (Hypocryptadius cinnamomeus)
	Carpospiza	Pale rockfinch (Carpospiza brachydactyla)
	Petronia	Rock sparrow (Petronia petronia)
	Onychostruthus	White-rumped snowfinch (Onychostruthus taczanowskii)
	Montifringilla	Tibetan snowfinch (Montifringilla henrici); White-winged snowfinch (Montifringilla nivalis); Black-winged snowfinch (Montifringilla adamsi)
	Pyrgilauda	Afghan snowfinch (Pyrgilauda theresae); Rufous-necked snowfinch (Pyrgilauda ruficollis); Père David's snowfinch (Pyrgilauda davidiana); Blanford's snowfinch (Pyrgilauda blanfordi)
	Gymnoris	Yellow-spotted bush sparrow (Gymnoris pyrgita); Yellow-throated bush sparrow (Gymnoris superciliaris); Sahel bush sparrow (Gymnoris dentata); Yellow-throated sparrow (Gymnoris xanthocollis)
	Passer, the true sparrows	Cape sparrow (Passer melanurus); Chestnut sparrow (Passer eminibey); Kordofan sparrow (Passer cordofanicus); Shelley's sparrow (Passer shelleyi); Kenya sparrow (Passer rufocinctus); Great sparrow (Passer motitensis); Northern grey-headed sparrow (Passer griseus); Swainson's sparrow (Passer swainsonii); Swahili sparrow (Passer suahelicus); Parrot-billed sparrow (Passer gongonensis); Southern grey-headed sparrow (Passer diffusus); Sind sparrow (Passer pyrrhonotus); Russet sparrow (Passer cinnamomeus); Eurasian tree sparrow (Passer montanus); Saxaul sparrow (Passer ammodendri); Plain-backed sparrow (Passer flaveolus); Abd al-Kuri sparrow (Passer hemileucus); Socotra sparrow (Passer insularis); Spanish sparrow (Passer hispaniolensis); Italian sparrow (Passer italiae); House sparrow (Passer domesticus); Somali sparrow (Passer castanopterus); Iago sparrow (Passer iagoensis); Desert sparrow (Passer simplex); Zarudny's sparrow (Passer zarudnyi); Arabian golden sparrow (Passer euchlorus); Sudan golden sparrow (Passer luteus); Dead Sea sparrow (Passer moabiticus)

== Distribution and habitat ==
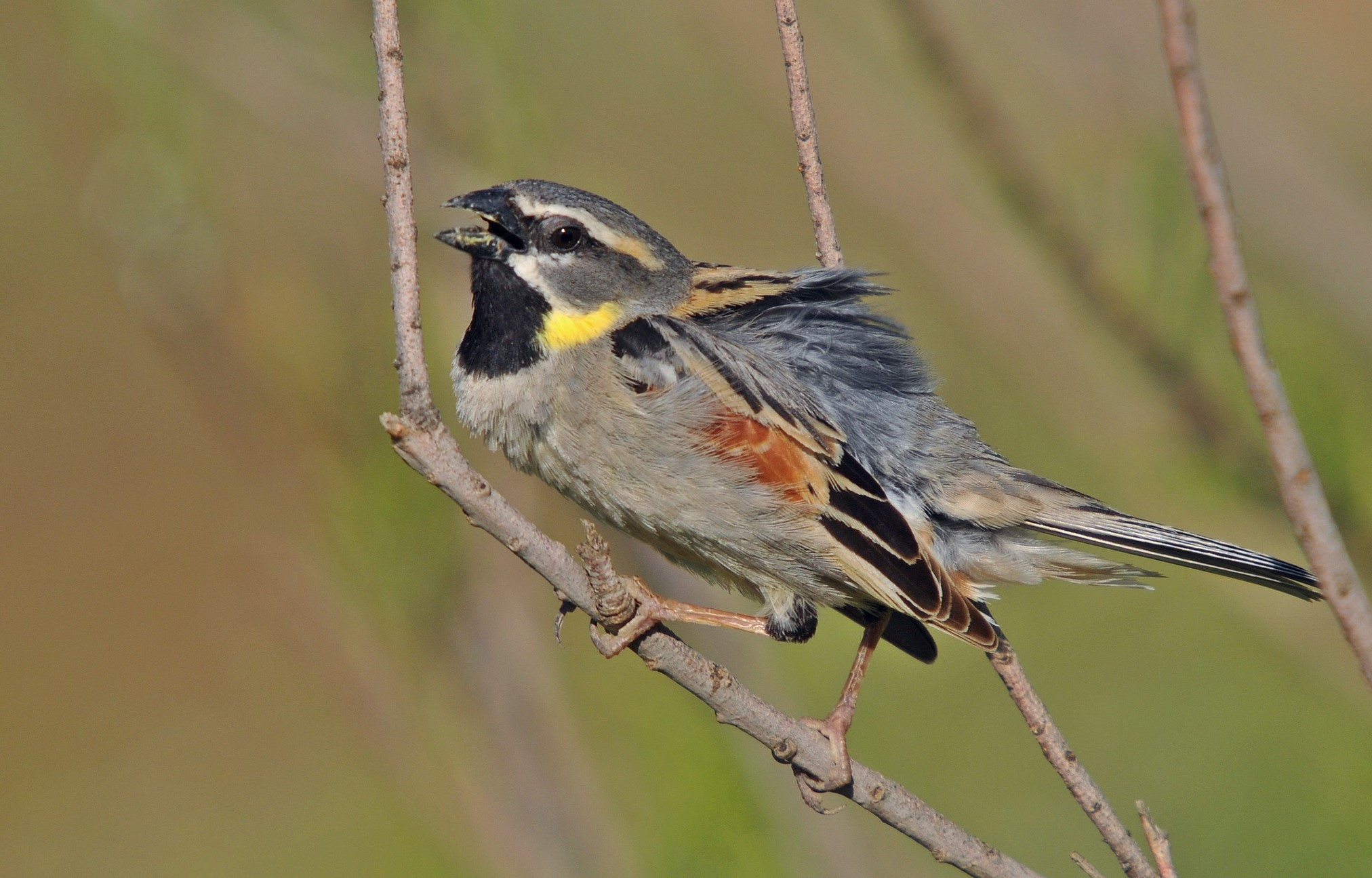
A male Dead Sea sparrow in southeastern Turkey

The Old World sparrows are indigenous to Europe, Africa and Asia. In the Americas, Australia, and other parts of the world, settlers imported some species which quickly naturalised, particularly in urban and degraded areas. House sparrows, for example, are now found throughout North America, Australia (every state except Western Australia), parts of southern and eastern Africa, and over much of the heavily populated parts of South America.

The Old World sparrows are generally birds of open habitats, including grasslands, deserts, and scrubland. The snowfinches and ground-sparrows are all species of high latitudes. A few species, like the Eurasian tree sparrow, inhabit open woodland. The aberrant cinnamon ibon has the most unusual habitat of the family, inhabiting the canopy of cloud forest in the Philippines.

== Behaviour and ecology ==
Old World sparrows are generally social birds, with many species breeding in loose colonies and most species occurring in flocks during the non-breeding season. The great sparrow is an exception, breeding in solitary pairs and remaining only in small family groups in the non-breeding season. They form large roosting aggregations in the non-breeding seasons that contain only a single species (in contrast to multi-species flocks that might gather for foraging). Sites are chosen for cover and include trees, thick bushes and reed beds. The assemblages can be quite large with up to 10,000 house sparrows counted in one roost in Egypt.

The Old World sparrows are some of the few passerine birds that engage in dust bathing. They will first scratch a hole in the ground with their feet, then lie in it and fling dirt or sand over their bodies with flicks of their wings. They will also bathe in water, or in dry or melting snow. Water bathing is similar to dust bathing, with the sparrow standing in shallow water and flicking water over its back with its wings, also ducking its head under the water. Both activities are social, with up to a hundred birds participating at once, and is followed by preening and sometimes group singing.

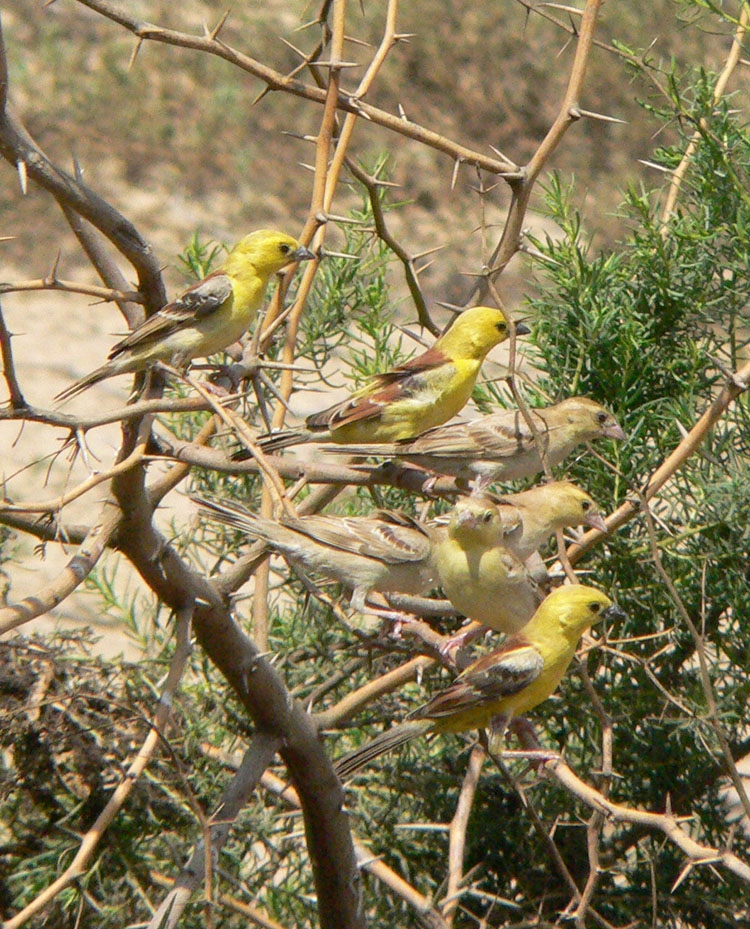
Sudan golden sparrows, seen here on the Red Sea coast of Sudan, are highly gregarious outside of the breeding season.

House sparrows water bathing near Black Sea in Batumi, Georgia

=== Eggs ===
The house sparrow typically lays 3–6 eggs, but has been known to lay as few as 1 and as many as 8 greenish-white eggs. The incubation period is typically 10–14 days.

== Relationships with humans ==
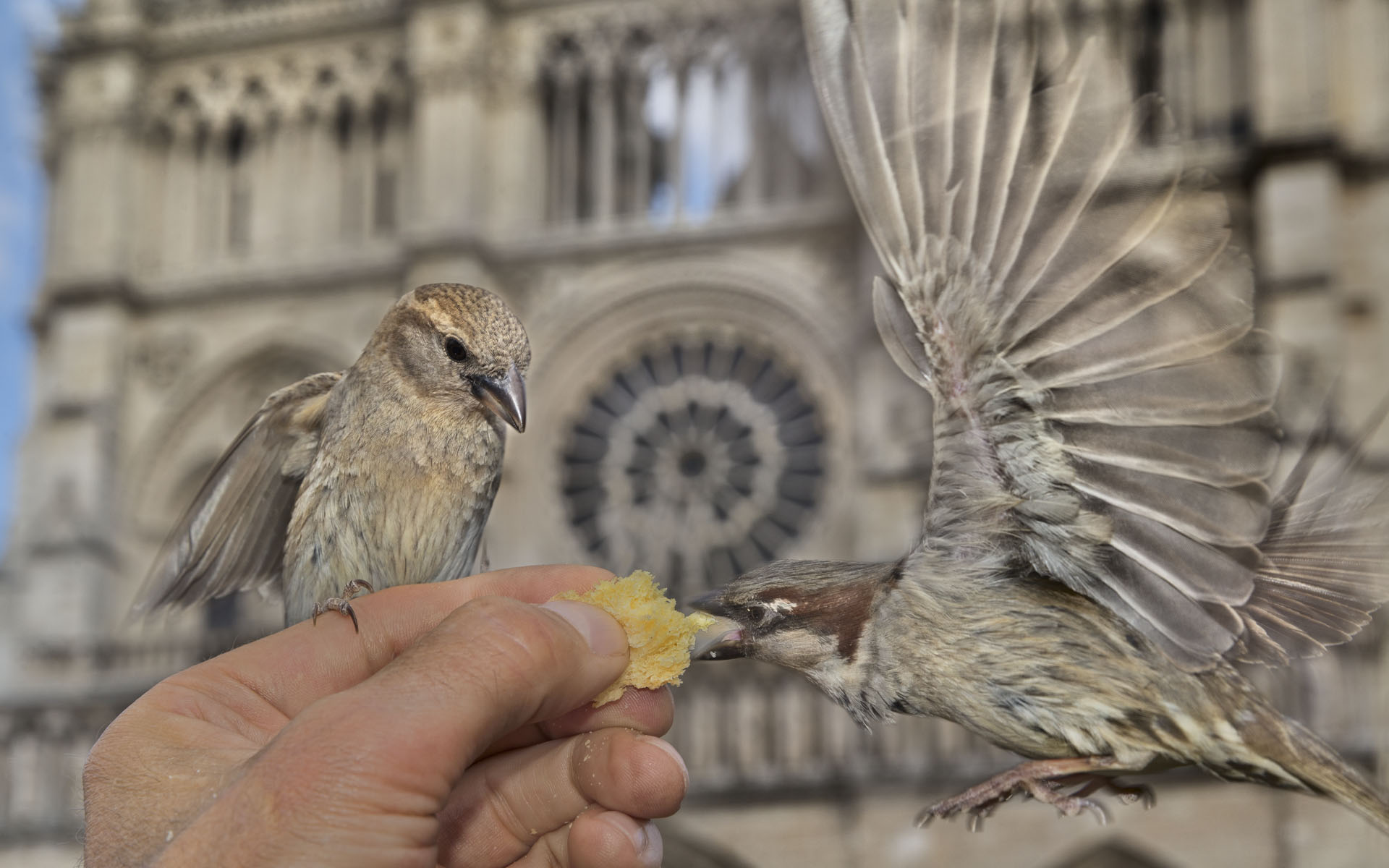
House sparrows being fed brioche in front of Notre-Dame Cathedral in Paris.

Old World sparrows may be the most familiar of all wild birds worldwide. Many species commonly live in agricultural areas, and for several, human settlements are a primary habitat. The Eurasian tree and house sparrows are particularly specialised in living around humans and inhabit cities in large numbers. 17 of the 26 species recognised by the Handbook of the Birds of the World are known to nest on and feed around buildings.

Grain-eating species, in particular the house and Sudan golden sparrows, can be significant agricultural pests. They can be beneficial to humans as well, especially by eating insect pests. Attempts at large-scale control have failed to affect populations significantly, or have been accompanied by major increases in insect attacks probably resulting from a reduction of numbers, as in the Great Sparrow Campaign in 1950s China.

Because of their familiarity, the house sparrow and other species of the family are frequently used to represent the common and vulgar, or the lewd. Birds usually described later as Old World sparrows are referred to in many works of ancient literature and religious texts in Europe and western Asia. These references may not always refer specifically to Old World sparrows, or even to small, seed-eating birds, but later writers who were inspired by these texts often had the house sparrow and other members of the family in mind. In particular, Old World sparrows were associated by the ancient Greeks with Aphrodite, the goddess of love, due to their perceived lustfulness, an association echoed by later writers such as Chaucer and Shakespeare. Jesus's use of "sparrows" as an example of divine providence in the Gospel of Matthew also inspired later references, such as that in the final scene of Shakespeare's Hamlet and the hymn "His Eye Is on the Sparrow".

Sparrows are represented in ancient Egyptian art very rarely, but an Egyptian hieroglyph G37 is based on the house sparrow. The symbol had no phonetic value and was used as a determinative in words to indicate small, narrow, or bad.

Old World sparrows have been kept as pets at many times in history, even though most are not particularly colourful and their songs are unremarkable. The earliest mentions of pet sparrows are from the Romans. Not all the passeri mentioned, often as pets, in Roman literature were necessarily sparrows. John Skelton's The Boke of Phyllyp Sparowe is a lament for a pet house sparrow belonging to a Jane Scrope, narrated by Scrope. Sparrows are difficult to keep, as pet sparrows must be raised by hand and a considerable amount of insects are required to feed them. Nevertheless, many people succeed at hand-raising orphaned or abandoned baby sparrows.
