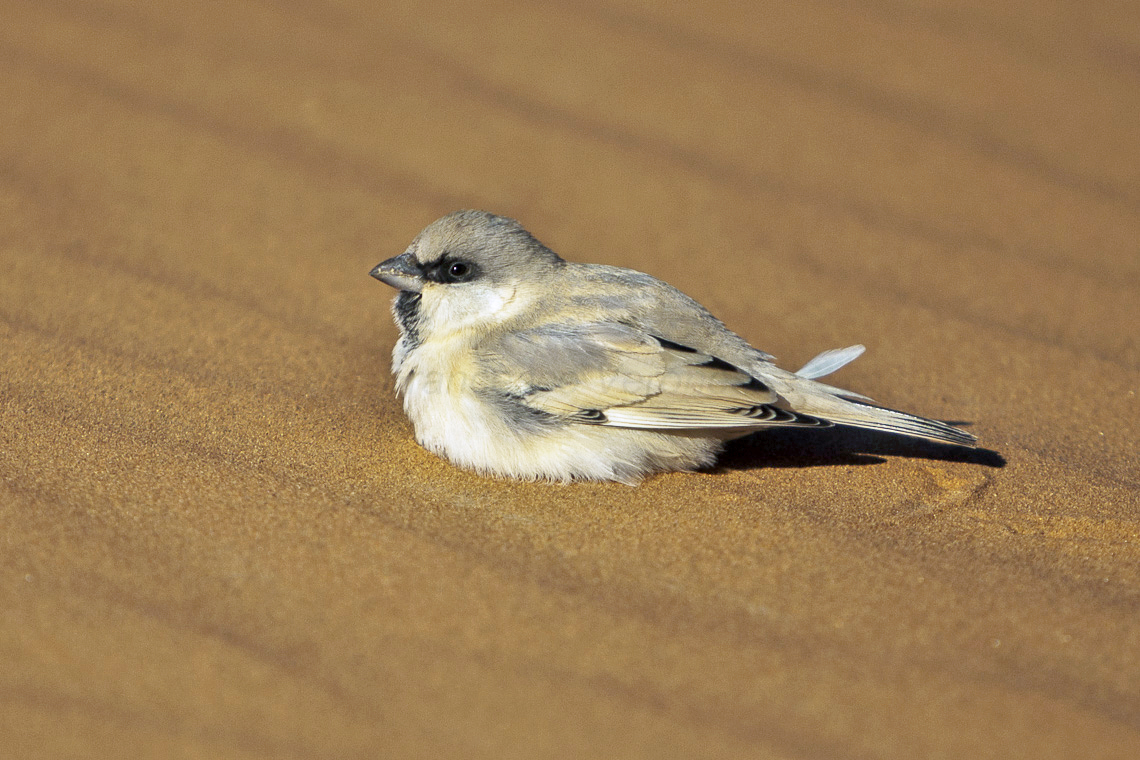
- Male in Morocco

Conservation status
- Least Concern (IUCN 3.1)

Scientific classification
- Kingdom: Animalia
- Phylum: Chordata
- Class: Aves
- Order: Passeriformes
- Family: Passeridae
- Genus: Passer
- Species: P. simplex

Binomial name
- Passer simplex (Lichtenstein, MHC, 1823)
- The ranges of the desert sparrow and Zarudny's sparrow

= Desert sparrow =

Species of bird

The desert sparrow (Passer simplex) is a species of bird in the sparrow family Passeridae, found in the Sahara Desert of northern Africa. A similar bird, Zarudny's sparrow, is found in Central Asia and was historically recognised as a subspecies of the desert sparrow, but varies in a number of ways and is now recognised as a separate species by BirdLife International, the IOC World Bird List, and the Handbook of the Birds of the World Alive.

The desert sparrow has two subspecies which occur in some of driest parts of the Sahara Desert in Northern Africa. This species is becoming scarcer as a result of habitat destruction, but it is assessed on the IUCN Red List as being of least concern for conservation. Zarudny's sparrow is also considered to be a least concern species, as was the combined species recognised before 2012.

The desert sparrow is not afraid to come near humans and sometimes builds nests in muddy walls. The Mozabite Berbers build their homes with holes in the walls to welcome these birds, which they call "bar-rode", and if one sings all day in the house, they say this is a sign of good news. The Tuareg, who call the bird "moula-moula", also say that this bird brings good news when it comes to stay near the camp.

== Gallery ==
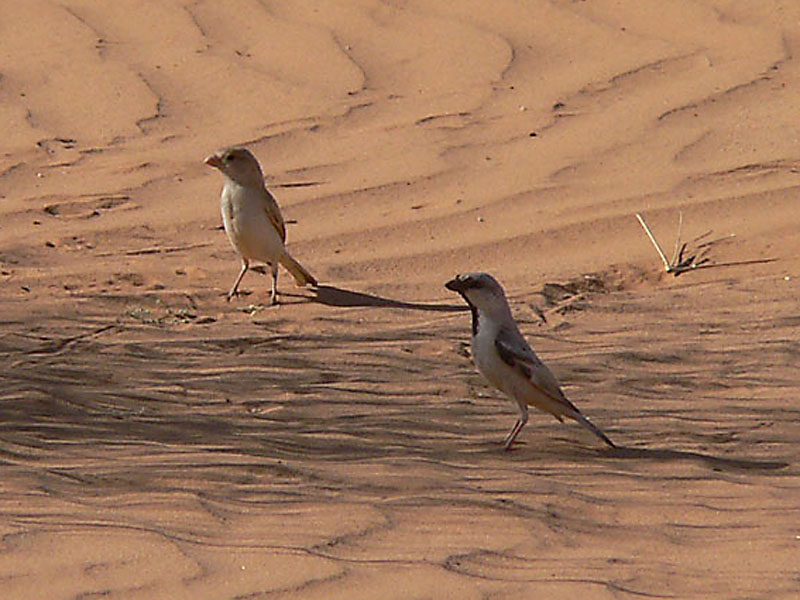
A pair of the subspecies P. s. saharae near Benichab, Mauritania

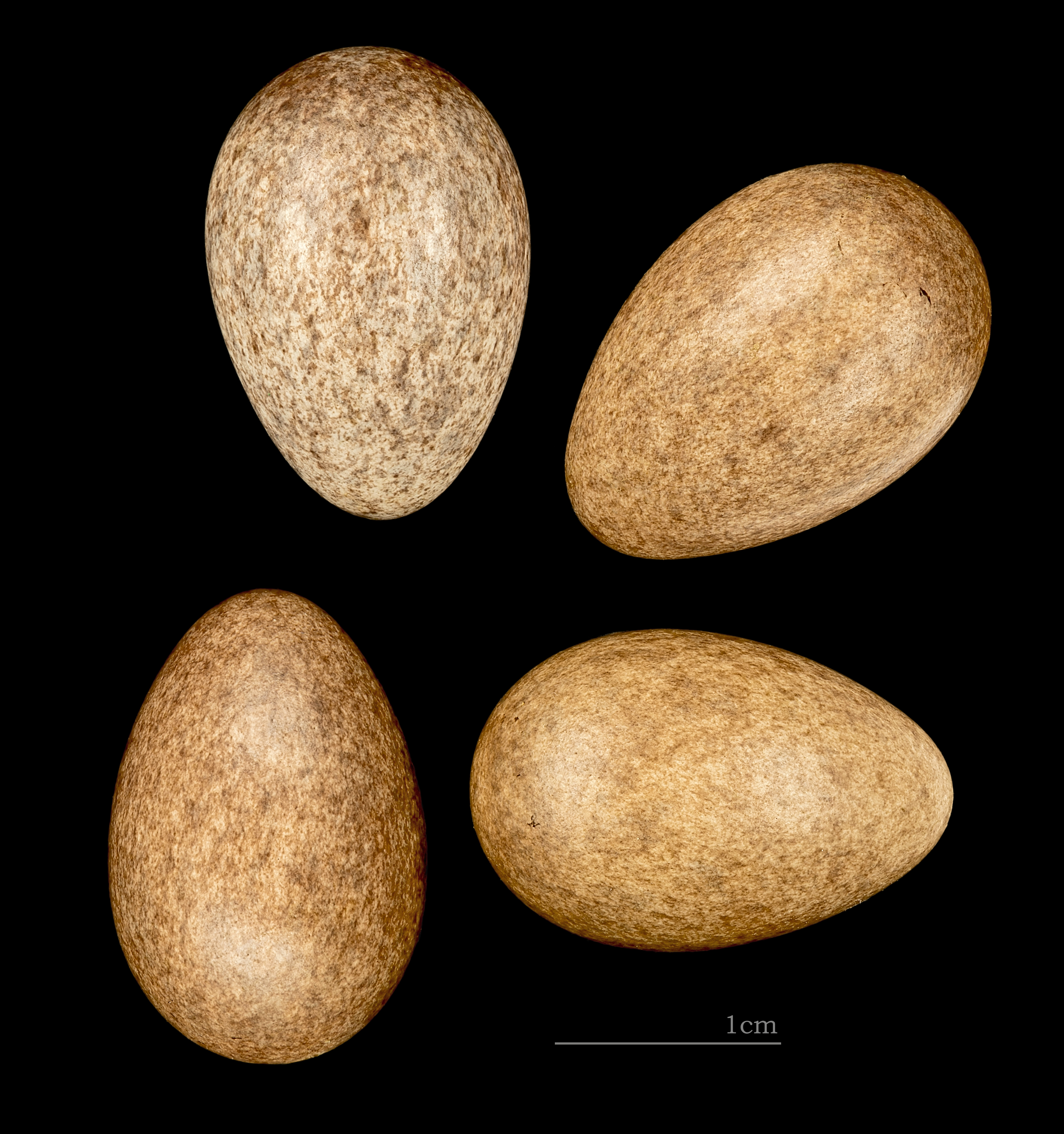
Eggs of Passer simplex saharae from the collections of the MHNT
