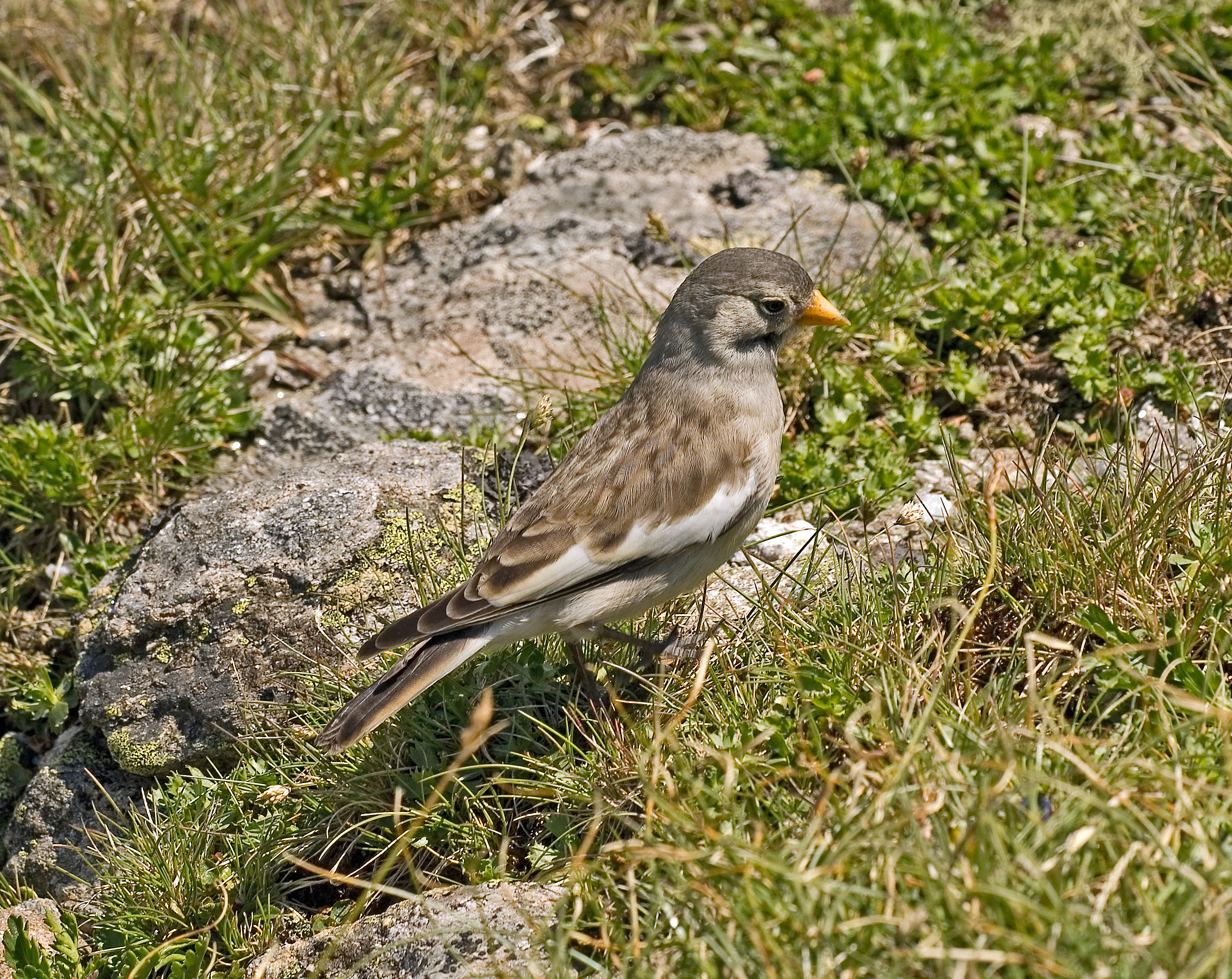
- White-winged snowfinch (Montifringilla nivalis)

Scientific classification
- Kingdom: Animalia
- Phylum: Chordata
- Class: Aves
- Order: Passeriformes
- Family: Passeridae
- Genus: Montifringilla; Brehm, CL, 1828

Type species
- Fringilla nivalis Linnaeus, 1766

Diversity
- 3 species

Synonyms
- Chionospina Kaup, 1829; Chionospiza G.R. Gray, 1841 (lapsus; non Kaup, 1836); Chionospiza Reichenbach, 1850; Onychospiza Przewalski, 1876 (non Rey, 1872: preoccupied); Orites Keyserling and Blasius, 1840; Orospiza Bonaparte, 1850 (non Kaup, 1829: lapsus)

= Montifringilla =

Genus of birds

Montifringilla is a genus of passerine birds in the sparrow family Passeridae. It is one of three genera containing the snowfinches. As the English and scientific names suggest, these are high-altitude species, found in the mountain ranges of southern Eurasia, from the Pyrenees east to the Himalayas, Tibet and western China.

== Description ==
Snowfinches are stocky sparrows 13.5–17 centimetres (5.3–6.7 in) in length, with strong conical bills. They have pale brown upperparts, white underparts and extensive white panels in the wings, which transform them in flight. Adults may have black markings on the chin or around the eyes. Sexes are usually very similar, although the male white-winged snowfinch has a distinctive grey head. Young birds are a drabber version of the adult.

They have simple repetitive songs, given from a rock or during the elaborate circling display flight. The call is a simple chip or similar.

== Ecology ==
Most snowfinches breed above altitudes of 3,500 metres (11,500 ft), but the white-winged snowfinch can occur from 1,800 metres (5,900 ft) upwards. These hardy birds inhabit bare open mountain grassland. Snowfinches are not migratory but may move to lower altitudes or human habitation in winter, when these highly gregarious birds form large flocks. Snowfinches are primarily ground-feeding seed-eaters, though they also consume small arthropods, especially when breeding. They are typically fearless, and will forage around ski resorts, human habitation and rubbish tips.

They nest in rock crevices, or more typically in holes left by rodents or (and even more often) pikas (Ochotonidae). The typical clutch is from three to six eggs.

== Systematics and taxonomy ==
The genus Montifringilla was introduced by the German ornithologist Christian Ludwig Brehm in 1828. The type species was subsequently designated as the white-winged snowfinch. The name of the genus combines the Latin words mons, montis "mountain" and fringilla "finch".

=== Species and systematics ===
The genus contains three species:

Image	Scientific name	Common name	Distribution
	Montifringilla henrici	Tibetan snowfinch	Tibet
	Montifringilla nivalis	White-winged snowfinch	southern Europe (Pyrenees, Alps, Corsica, Balkans) and through central Asia to western China
	Montifringilla adamsi	Black-winged snowfinch	China, India, Nepal, and Pakistan

Four species of snowfich are now separated in the genus Pyrgilauda, based on the genetics and the different vocalizations and ecological preferences. Similarly, the white-rumped snowfinch is placed in a monotypic genus Onychostruthus.

=== Taxonomy ===
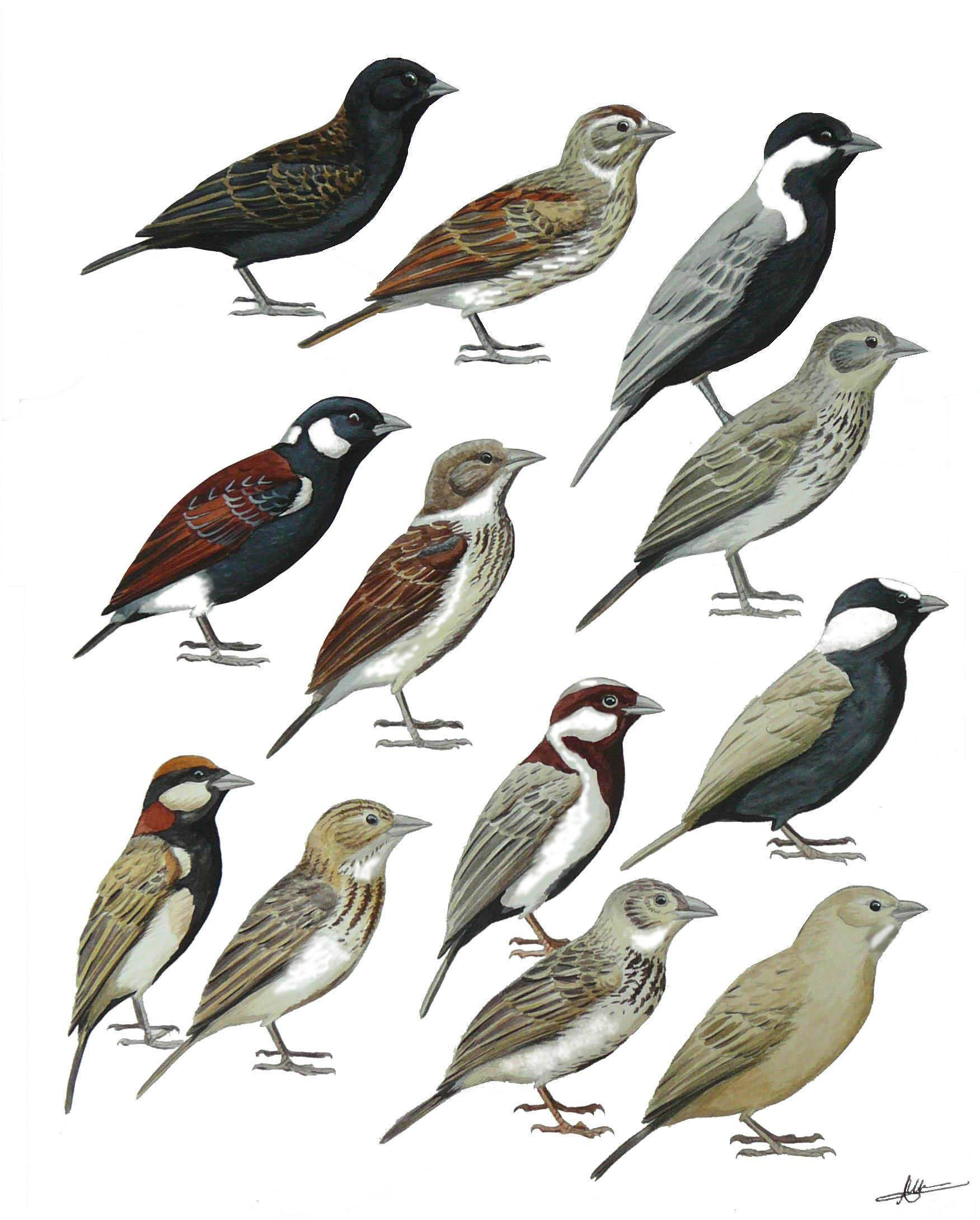
Many sparrow-larks (Eremopterix) were once placed in a genus Pyrrhulauda, causing much confusion in the taxonomy of the unrelated snowfinches

The junior synonyms of Montifringilla have a convoluted history. Pyrgilauda is probably the most confused case among them: It was first established by Charles Lucien Jules Laurent Bonaparte as a junior synonym of Pyrrhulauda, and attributed to the brothers Edouard and Jules Verreaux. But Pyrrhulauda – established by Andrew Smith before Bonaparte – actually refers to certain sparrow-larks, today all placed in Eremopterix. J. Verreaux indeed seems to have been the first to formally use Pyrgilauda for a particular snowfinch species, but that was only in 1871, when he described the small snowfinch. It was widely used for the southern snowfinch species in the late 19th and early 20th century, and continues to be used by some authors today.

According to Article 11.6.1. and 50.7. in the third and fourth editions of the International Code of Zoological Nomenclature, the genus Pyrgilauda was thus validly established by Bonaparte as a possible snowfinch genus name – even though he did not intend to – because many authors after J. Verreaux used it for these birds, and not for the sparrow-larks. Bonaparte had correctly used Montifrigilla for the white-winged snowfinch – the only snowfinch known then – however, and thus Pyrgilauda had remained an unused "shell" of a taxon until someone placed a species in it. That was done by J. Verreaux, and thus many erroneously attributed authorship of the genus to him, although as per the ICZN Code Article 69.3. he technically just fixed its type species as the small snowfinch. Another error occurred in 1982, when G. N. Kasin believed Pyrgilauda had been established twice, and thought the snowfinch genus name – which he believed to have been established by Verreaux in 1870 – was the junior homonym of Bonaparte's sparrow-lark synonym. He set up Stepaniania to replace it. But with Bonaparte's name (as co-opted by Verreaux and later authors) being a valid junior subjective synonym and not preoccupied, Stepaniania itself becomes a junior objective synonym of Pyrgilauda.

The name Orospiza has a similar history to Pyrgilauda. Bonaparte merely remarked it had been used by "some" (aliquī) unspecified authors, while many subsequent sources attributed it to Johann Jakob Kaup. But that is a misunderstanding, and the only technically valid (though synonymous) name for the snowfinch genus proposed by Kaup was Chionospina. Thus, in the case of Orospiza Bonaparte is again the valid author, though Thomas Horsfield and Frederic Moore were the first to set a type species. As M. nivalis was still the only known snowfinch in 1858 when they did this, Orospiza is a junior objective synonym of Montifringilla.

For somewhat different reasons, Orites is a junior objective synonym of Montifringilla. First proposed for the long-tailed tit (Aegithalos caudatus) in Moehring's Geslachten der Vogelen in 1758, that widely ignored work was suppressed as a source of taxa by the International Commission on Zoological Nomenclature in 1987. Consequently, later attempts to re-establish that name as a junior synonym of Aegithalos are preempted by the erection of Orites for the white-winged snowfinch by Eugen von Keyserling and Johann Heinrich Blasius in 1840. Meanwhile, Kaup's Chionospina was misspelled "Chionospiza" by George Robert Gray. As it, too, is a junior objective synonym of Montifringilla, Ludwig Reichenbach's subsequent valid establishment of that name is still inconsequential – except for purely taxonomic purposes, as it makes neither Kaup nor Grey the valid author of Chionospiza, but Reichenbach. And finally, Onychostruthus had to be established because Onychospiza, Nikolai Przhevalsky's 1876 name for the proposed monotypic genus of the white-rumped snowfinch, was preoccupied. It had been given by Rey to the chestnut-eared bunting (today Emberiza fucata) in 1872 already, as an unnecessary correction – and thus junior objective synonym – of Bonaparte's original Onychospina.
