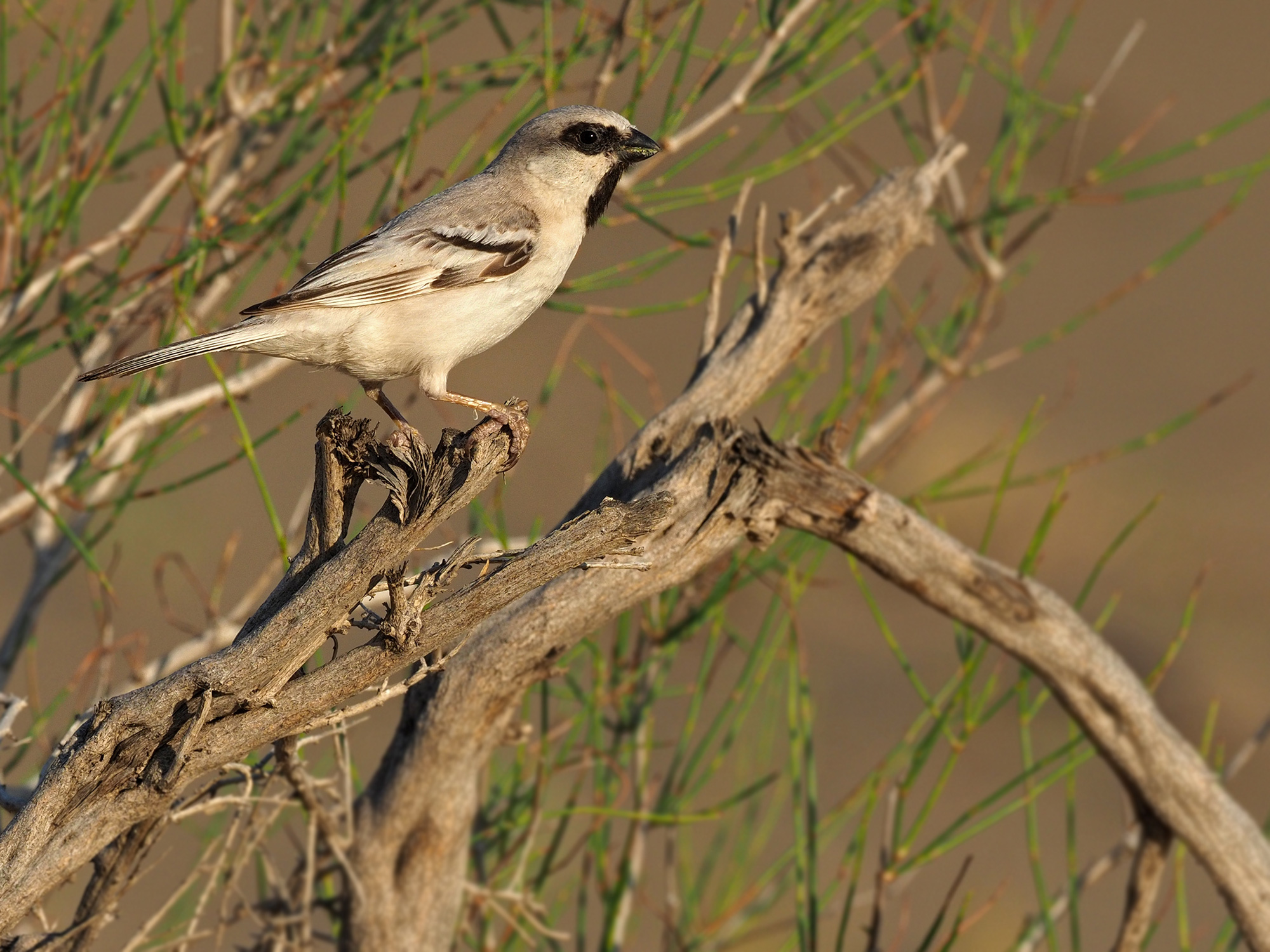
- Male

Conservation status
- Least Concern (IUCN 3.1)

Scientific classification
- Kingdom: Animalia
- Phylum: Chordata
- Class: Aves
- Order: Passeriformes
- Family: Passeridae
- Genus: Passer
- Species: P. zarudnyi

Binomial name
- Passer zarudnyi Pleske, 1896
- The range of Zarudny's sparrow and the desert sparrow

= Zarudny's sparrow =

Species of bird

Zarudny's sparrow (Passer zarudnyi), also known as the Asian desert sparrow, is a species of bird in the sparrow family Passeridae, which occurs in Uzbekistan, Turkmenistan, and formerly in Iran. This species has historically been classified as a subspecies of the desert sparrow, which is otherwise restricted to Africa. However, the species has a number of differences with the African species, including very similar plumage in adult males and females, which suggests this species is distinct enough to be considered separate, and possibly not most closely related to the African birds. Consequently, Zarudny's sparrow is treated as a separate species by BirdLife International, the IOC World Bird List, and the Handbook of the Birds of the World Alive.
