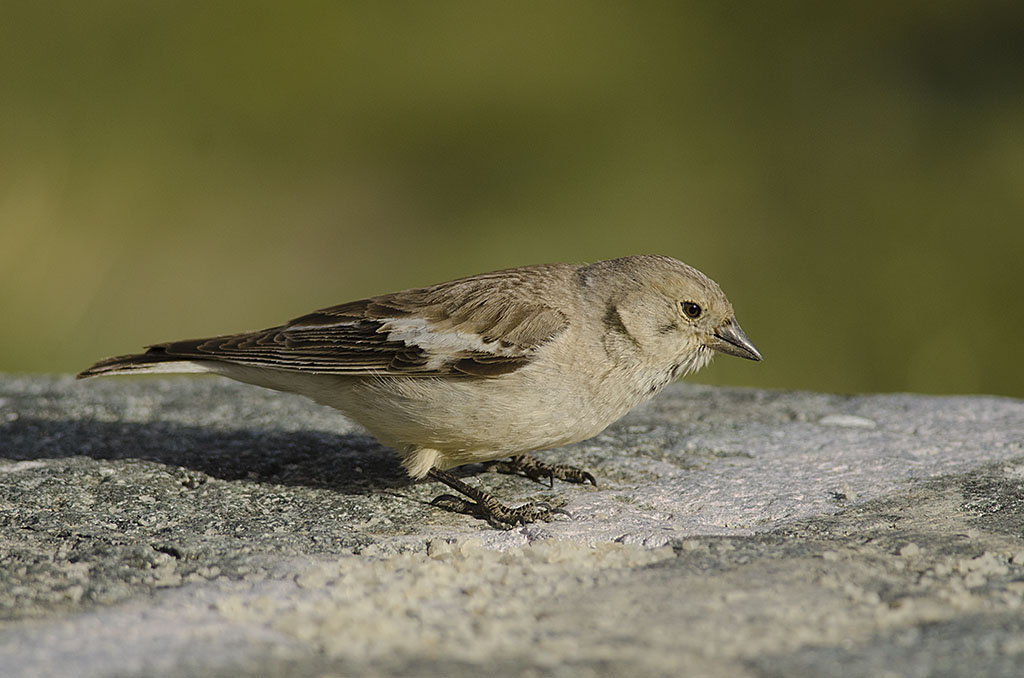
- Black-winged snowfinch, Ladakh, India

Conservation status
- Least Concern (IUCN 3.1)

Scientific classification
- Kingdom: Animalia
- Phylum: Chordata
- Class: Aves
- Order: Passeriformes
- Family: Passeridae
- Genus: Montifringilla
- Species: M. adamsi

Binomial name
- Montifringilla adamsi Adams, 1859

= Black-winged snowfinch =

Species of bird

The black-winged snowfinch or Adams's snowfinch (Montifringilla adamsi), is a species of bird in the sparrow family.

It is found in China, India, Nepal, and Pakistan. Its natural habitat is subtropical or tropical dry shrubland. It is commonly resident in the Tibetan plateau region of north-western Nepal, where it spends the summer at elevations of 4,200–5,100 metres (13,800–16,700 ft) and the winter at 2,530–3,445 metres (8,301–11,302 ft), on open stony hillsides, on plateau and near villages.
