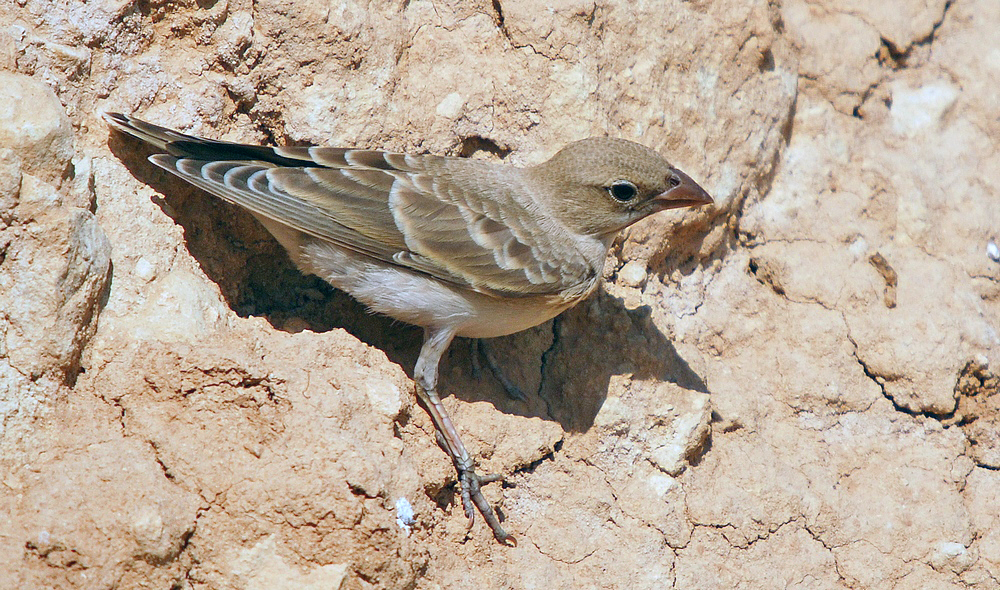
- Pale rockfinch in south-eastern Turkey

Conservation status
- Least Concern (IUCN 3.1)

Scientific classification
- Kingdom: Animalia
- Phylum: Chordata
- Class: Aves
- Order: Passeriformes
- Family: Passeridae
- Genus: Carpospiza von Müller, 1854
- Species: C. brachydactyla

Binomial name
- Carpospiza brachydactyla (Bonaparte, 1850)

Synonyms
- Petronia brachydactyla

= Pale rockfinch =

Species of bird

The pale rockfinch or pale rock sparrow (Carpospiza brachydactyla) is a small sparrow found in the Middle East and Central Asia. It is the only member of the genus Carpospiza. Some authorities include it in the genus Petronia. Others have placed it in the finch family due to some similarities in behaviour and form, but the anatomy of its tongue exhibits characteristic sparrow features.

The range of pale rockfinch extends from eastern Turkey to Afghanistan, and south into the Arabian Peninsula and northern Africa as far as Ethiopia. Its natural habitats are subtropical or tropical dry shrubland and temperate grassland.

The breeding pattern of the pale rock sparrow is associated with specific aspects of habitat. Presence of this species is associated with temperature, grasshopper and beetle abundance, whereas density is associated with available habitat. Since available habitat plays a role on the density of pale rockfinches, rapidly growing villages and cultivation are a threat to the population.

Accidental vagrant spotted on the ramparts of Kannur Fort, Kerala, India.

This species in now being increasingly found in India. It was first documented in India in January 2012, when a large wintering flock of over 250 birds was discovered in the Banni grasslands of the Rann of Kutch, Gujarat. Since that groundbreaking discovery, sightings in India have remained sparse and highly isolated, recorded across states like Rajasthan, Karnataka, and Kerala. Because its plain, sandy-gray plumage and features closely resemble the very common Yellow-throated Sparrow (Gymnoris xanthocollis), ornithologists suspect the bird is frequently overlooked by casual observers. When it does appear in coastal or southern areas like Kerala during migration, it is typically seen voraciously foraging on the ground for grass seeds and plant matter to fuel its grueling, non-stop migratory journey across the Arabian Sea back toward the African coast.
