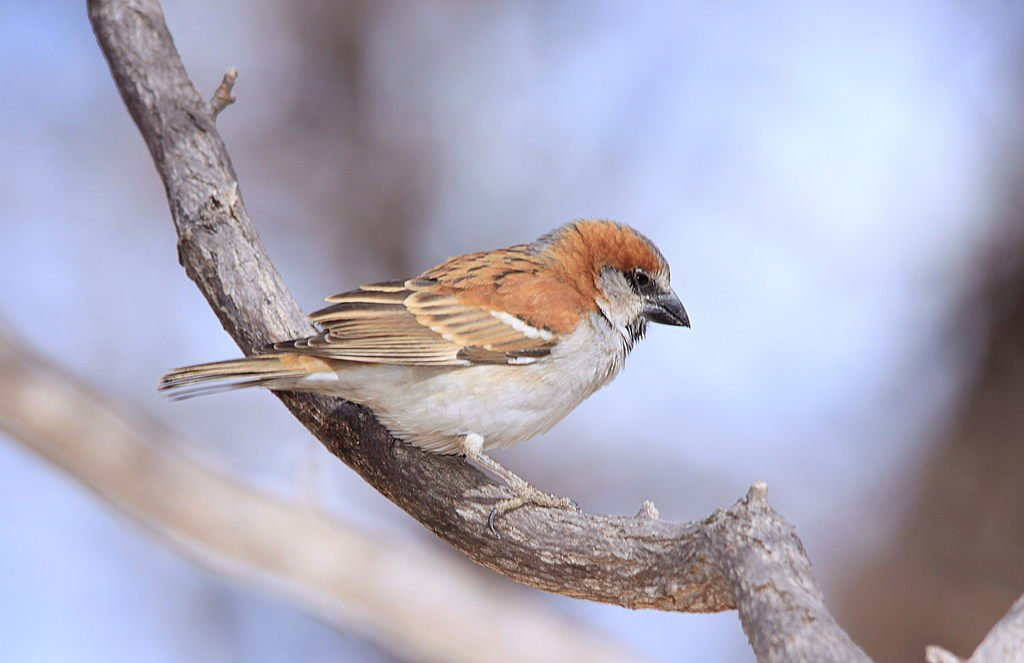

Conservation status
- Least Concern (IUCN 3.1)

Scientific classification
- Kingdom: Animalia
- Phylum: Chordata
- Class: Aves
- Order: Passeriformes
- Family: Passeridae
- Genus: Passer
- Species: P. motitensis

Binomial name
- Passer motitensis (Smith, 1836)

= Great sparrow =

Species of bird

The great sparrow (Passer motitensis), also known as the southern rufous sparrow, is found in southern Africa in dry, wooded savannah and towns.

This is a 15–16 cm long sparrow superficially like a large house sparrow. It has a grey crown and rear neck and rufous upperparts.

While in the past some authorities considered this species and several related species of 'rufous sparrow' on the African mainland to be the same as the Iago sparrow of Cape Verde, they do not appear to be so closely related as thought. A few currently recognise only some of the rufous sparrows as separate from the great sparrow, but the Handbook of the Birds of the World and BirdLife International recognise the Socotra sparrow, Kenya sparrow, Kordofan sparrow, and Shelley's sparrow as separate species.
