= Rufous-backed sparrow =

Rufous-backed sparrow is a mostly obsolete name for several different birds:

- Iago sparrow
- Sind sparrow

== See also ==
- Rufous sparrow (disambiguation)
