= Kordofan sparrow =

Conservation status
- Least Concern (IUCN 3.1)

Scientific classification
- Kingdom: Animalia
- Phylum: Chordata
- Class: Aves
- Order: Passeriformes
- Family: Passeridae
- Genus: Passer
- Species: P. cordofanicus

Binomial name
- Passer cordofanicus Heuglin, 1874

Synonyms
- Passer iagoensis cordofanicus; Passer motitensis cordofanicus; Passer rufocinctus cordofanicus

African species of sparrow

The Kordofan sparrow (Passer cordofanicus), also known as the Kordofan rufous sparrow, is a sparrow found only in southwestern Sudan and adjacent border regions of South Sudan and Chad. It is frequently considered a subspecies of the Kenya sparrow, which in turn is considered a subspecies of the great sparrow.
