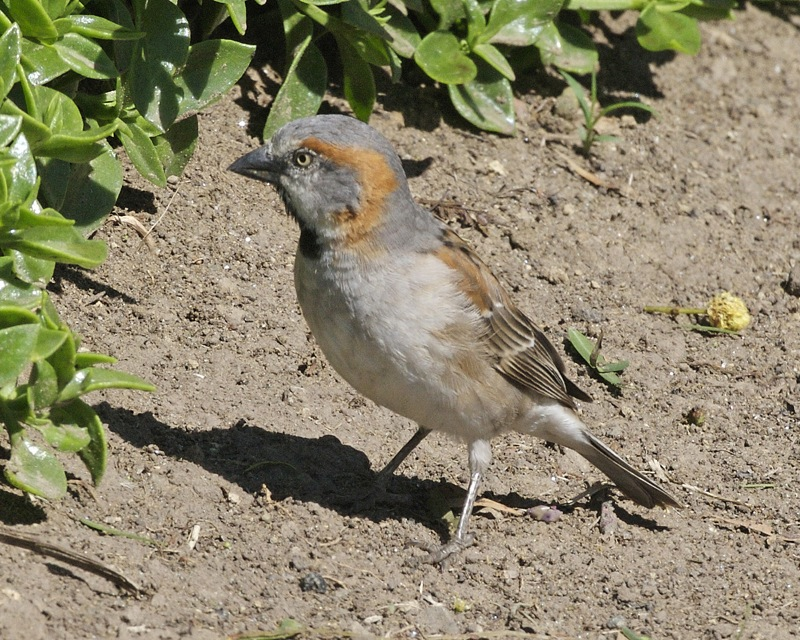

Conservation status
- Least Concern (IUCN 3.1)

Scientific classification
- Kingdom: Animalia
- Phylum: Chordata
- Class: Aves
- Order: Passeriformes
- Family: Passeridae
- Genus: Passer
- Species: P. rufocinctus

Binomial name
- Passer rufocinctus Fischer, GA & Reichenow, 1884

= Kenya sparrow =

Species of bird

The Kenya sparrow (Passer rufocinctus), also known as the Kenya rufous sparrow, is a sparrow found in Kenya and Tanzania. It tends to be found in dry wooded savannah and agricultural areas. Some authorities have lumped the great sparrow (P. motitensis), the Kenya sparrow, and the Socotra sparrow (P. insularis) into P. motitensis following Dowsett and Forbes-Watson (1993). Some authorities also lump Shelley's sparrow and the Kordofan sparrow with this species, or all three with the great sparrow.
