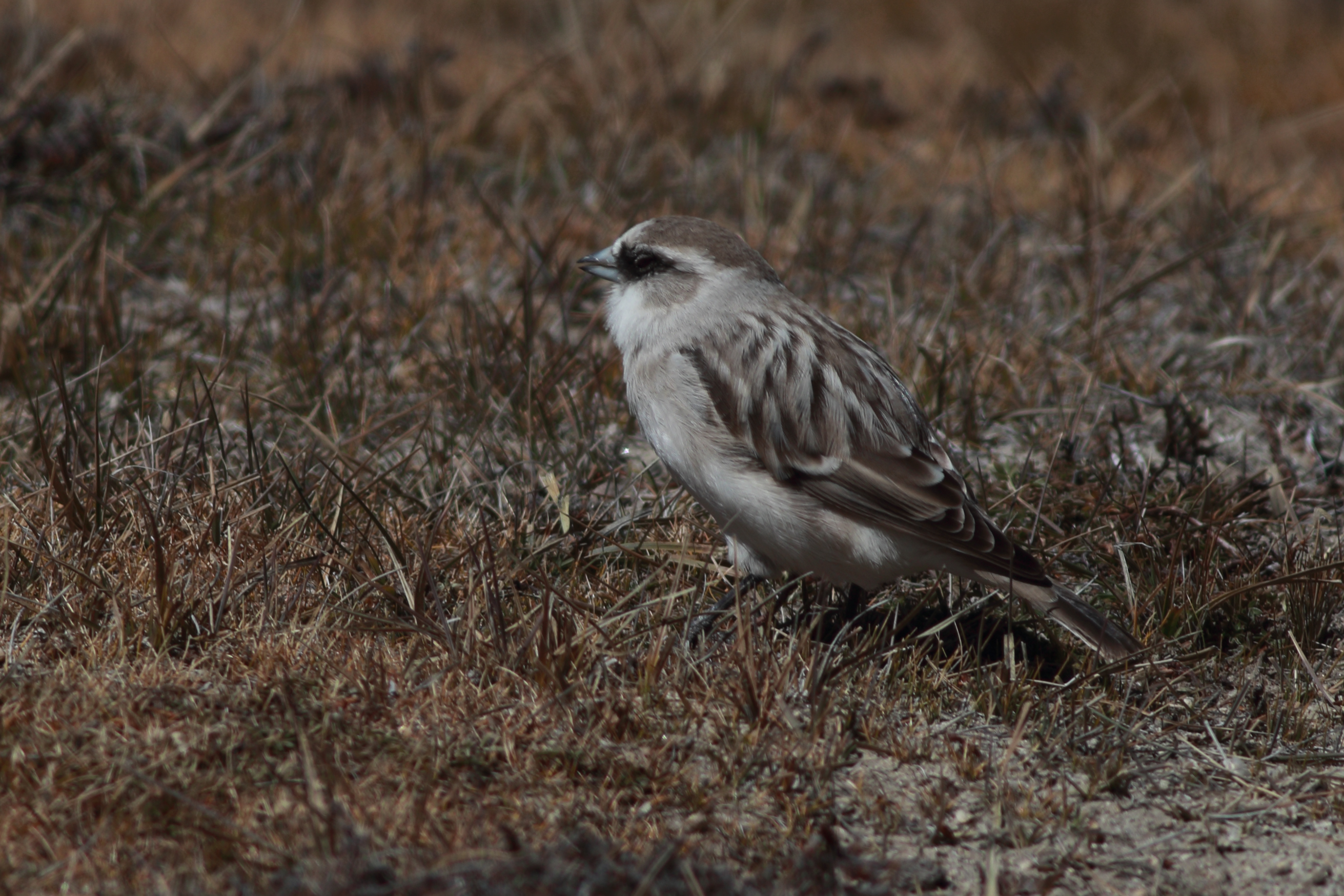
- From North Sikkim, India

Conservation status
- Least Concern (IUCN 3.1)

Scientific classification
- Kingdom: Animalia
- Phylum: Chordata
- Class: Aves
- Order: Passeriformes
- Family: Passeridae
- Genus: Onychostruthus; Richmond, 1917
- Species: O. taczanowskii

Binomial name
- Onychostruthus taczanowskii (Przewalski, 1876)

Synonyms
- Montifringilla taczanowskii

= White-rumped snowfinch =

Species of bird

The white-rumped snowfinch (Onychostruthus taczanowskii) is a species of passerine bird in the sparrow family Passeridae. It is the only member of the genus Onychostruthus. It is sometimes placed in the genus Montifringilla.

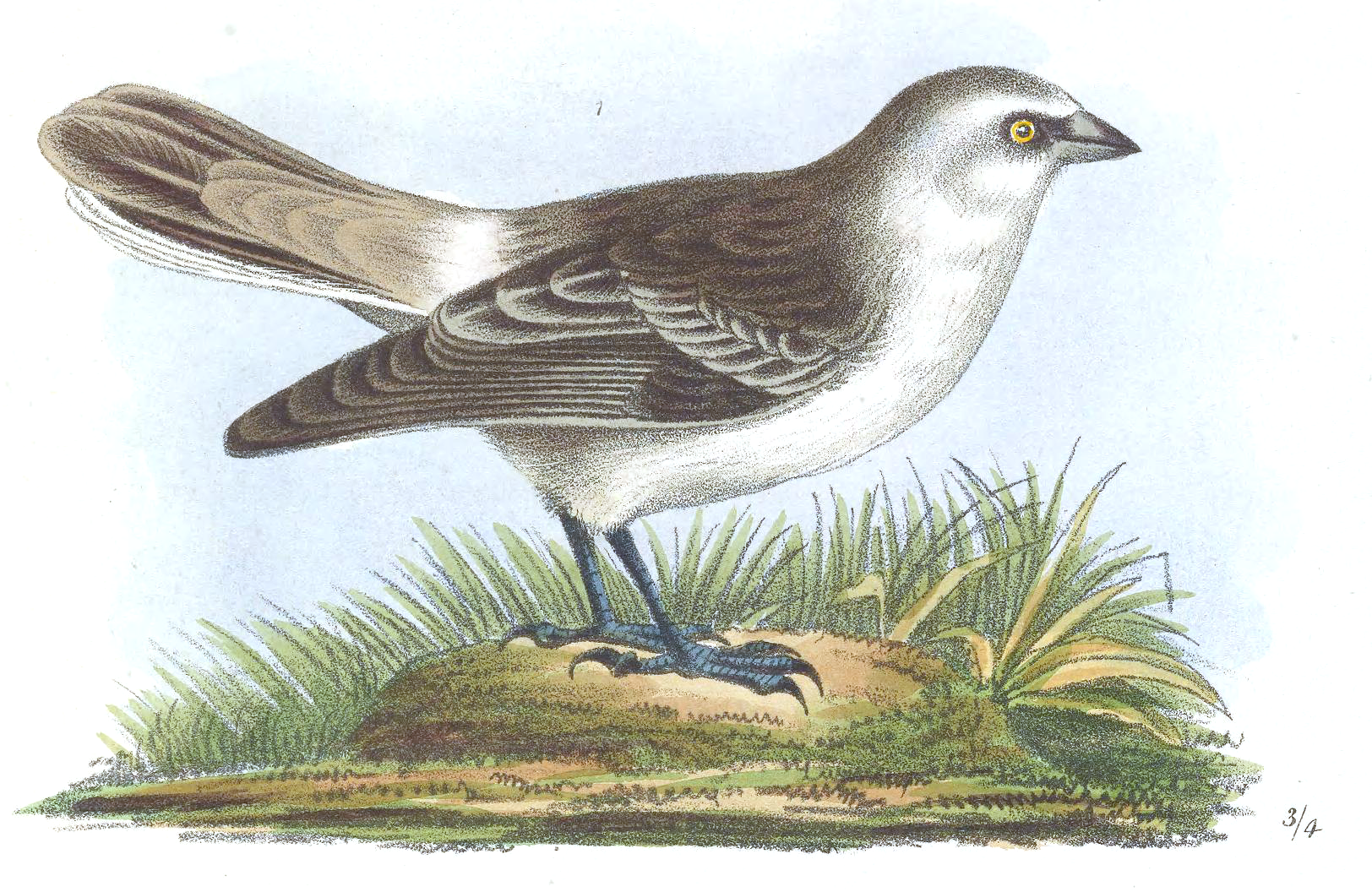
An 1876 illustration.

It is found in Tibet and central-northern China. Its natural habitats are rocky areas in mountainous regions.
