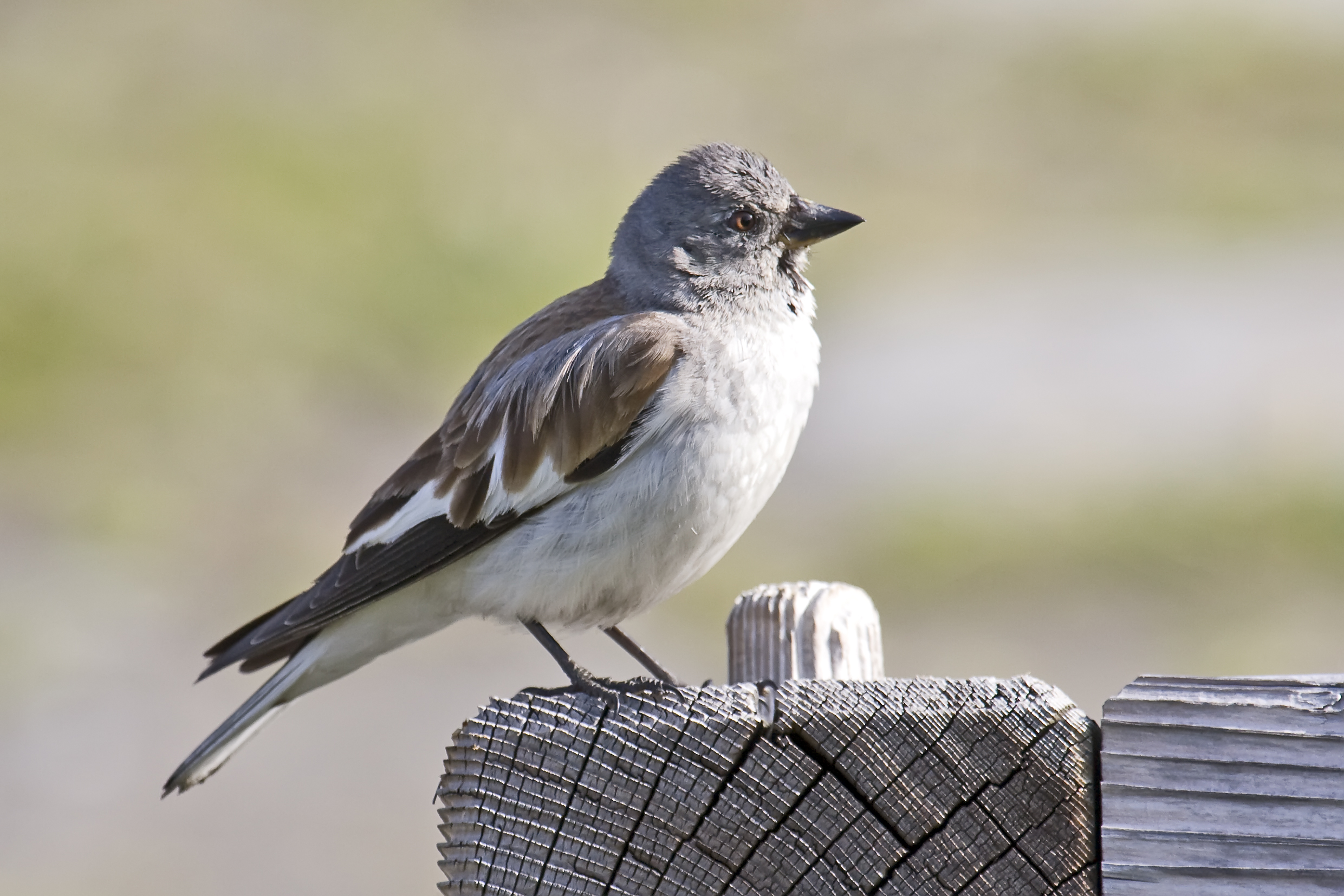

Conservation status
- Least Concern (IUCN 3.1)

Scientific classification
- Kingdom: Animalia
- Phylum: Chordata
- Class: Aves
- Order: Passeriformes
- Family: Passeridae
- Genus: Montifringilla
- Species: M. nivalis

Binomial name
- Montifringilla nivalis (Linnaeus, 1766)
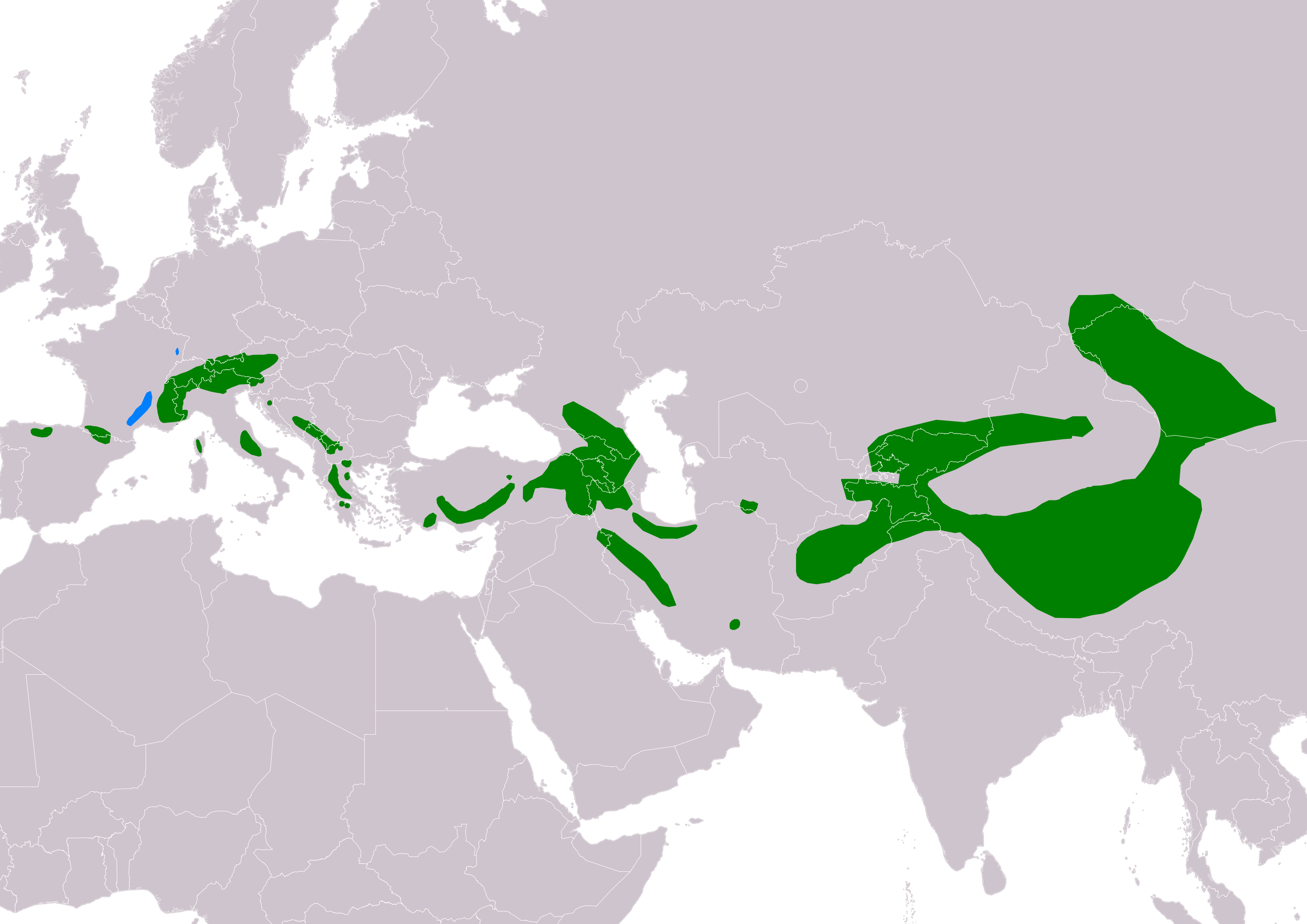
- Range of M. nivalis Resident Non-breeding

Synonyms
- Fringilla nivalis Linnaeus, 1766

= White-winged snowfinch =

Species of bird

The white-winged snowfinch (Montifringilla nivalis) is a small passerine bird. Despite its name, it is a sparrow rather than a true finch.

== Taxonomy ==
In 1760 the French zoologist Mathurin Jacques Brisson included a description of the white-winged snowfinch in his Ornithologie based on a specimen but without specifying where it had been collected. He used the French name Le pinçon de neige ou la niverolle and the Latin Fringilla nivalis. Although Brisson coined Latin names, these do not conform to the binomial system and are not recognised by the International Commission on Zoological Nomenclature. When in 1766 the Swedish naturalist Carl Linnaeus updated his Systema Naturae for the twelfth edition, he added 240 species that had been previously described by Brisson. One of these was the white-winged snowfinch. Linnaeus included a brief description, used the binomial name Fringilla nivalis and cited Brisson's work. Linnaeus listed the type location as "America". The type location was subsequently designated as Switzerland. The specific name nivalis is Latin for 'snowy' or 'snow-white'. This species is now placed in the genus Montifringilla that was introduced by the German ornithologist Christian Ludwig Brehm in 1828.

Seven subspecies are recognised:

- M. n. nivalis (Linnaeus, 1766) – south Europe
- M. n. leucura Bonaparte, 1855 – south and east Turkey
- M. n. alpicola (Pallas, 1811) – the Caucasus and north Iran to Afghanistan
- M. n. gaddi Zarudny & Loudon, 1904 – southwest Iran
- M. n. tianshanica Keve-Kleiner, 1943 – east Kazakhstan and north Tajikistan
- M. n. groumgrzimaili Zarudny & Loudon, 1904 – northwest China to central Mongolia
- M. n. kwenlunensis Bianchi, 1908 – west central China and north Tibet

== Description ==
The white-winged snowfinch is a large stocky snowfinch at 16.5–19 centimetres (6.5–7.5 in) in length. It has brown upperparts, white underparts and a grey head. There is a long narrow white wing panel. In summer, the bill is black, and there is a black bib. The bib is lost in winter and the bill becomes yellow. Sexes are similar.

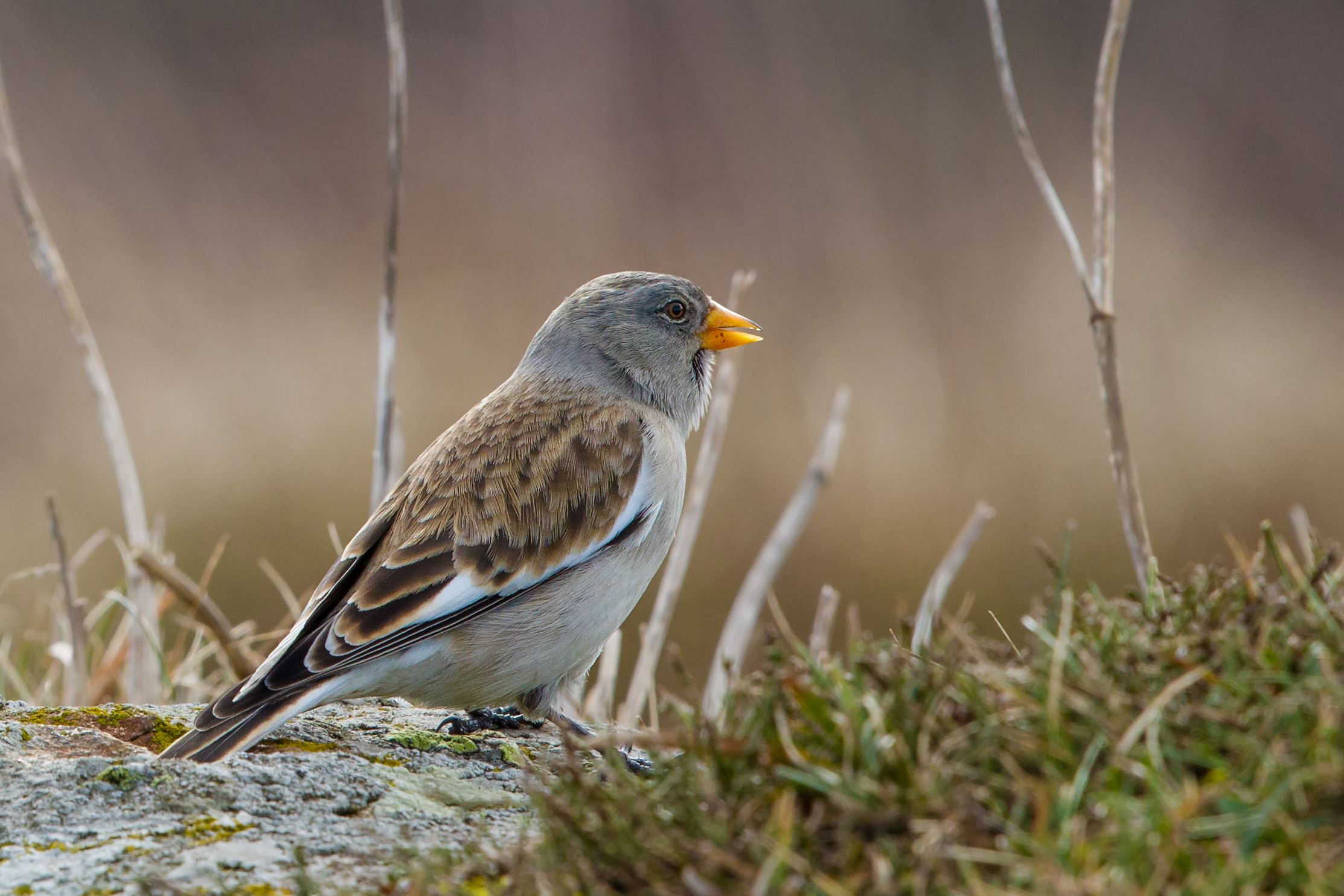
In Tarn, France in December showing winter colours including an orange beak

In flight, it shows black wings with huge white wing panels, and a white edged black tail. This bird has a chattering song with many trills, and variety of rolling or creaky calls.

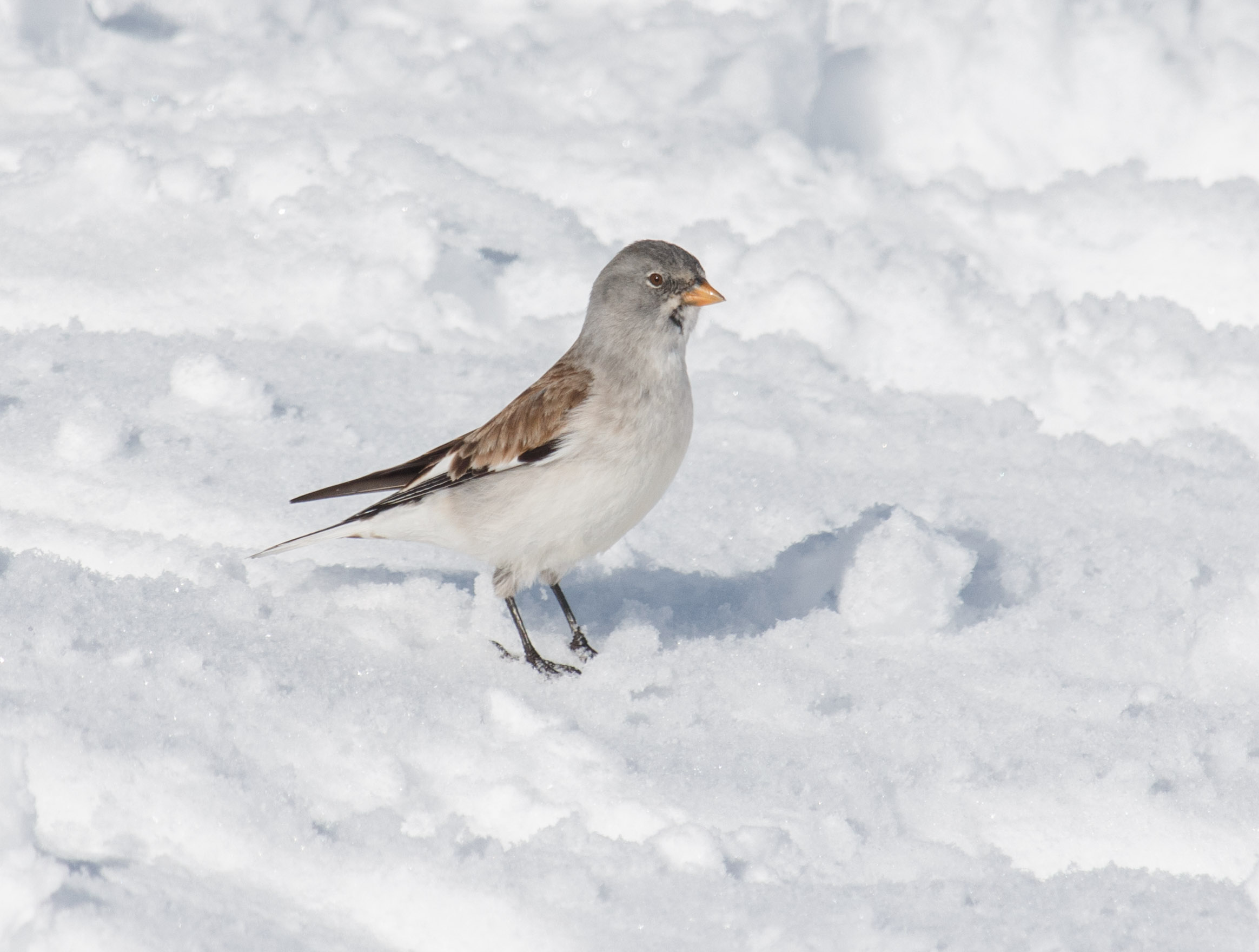
In Northern Alps, France in winter

== Distribution and habitat ==
It is a resident breeding species on bare mountains, typically above 1,500 metres (4,900 ft), across southern Europe (Pyrenees, Alps, Corsica, Balkans) and through central Asia to western China. It nests in crevices or rodent burrows, laying 3–4 eggs.

== Behaviour ==
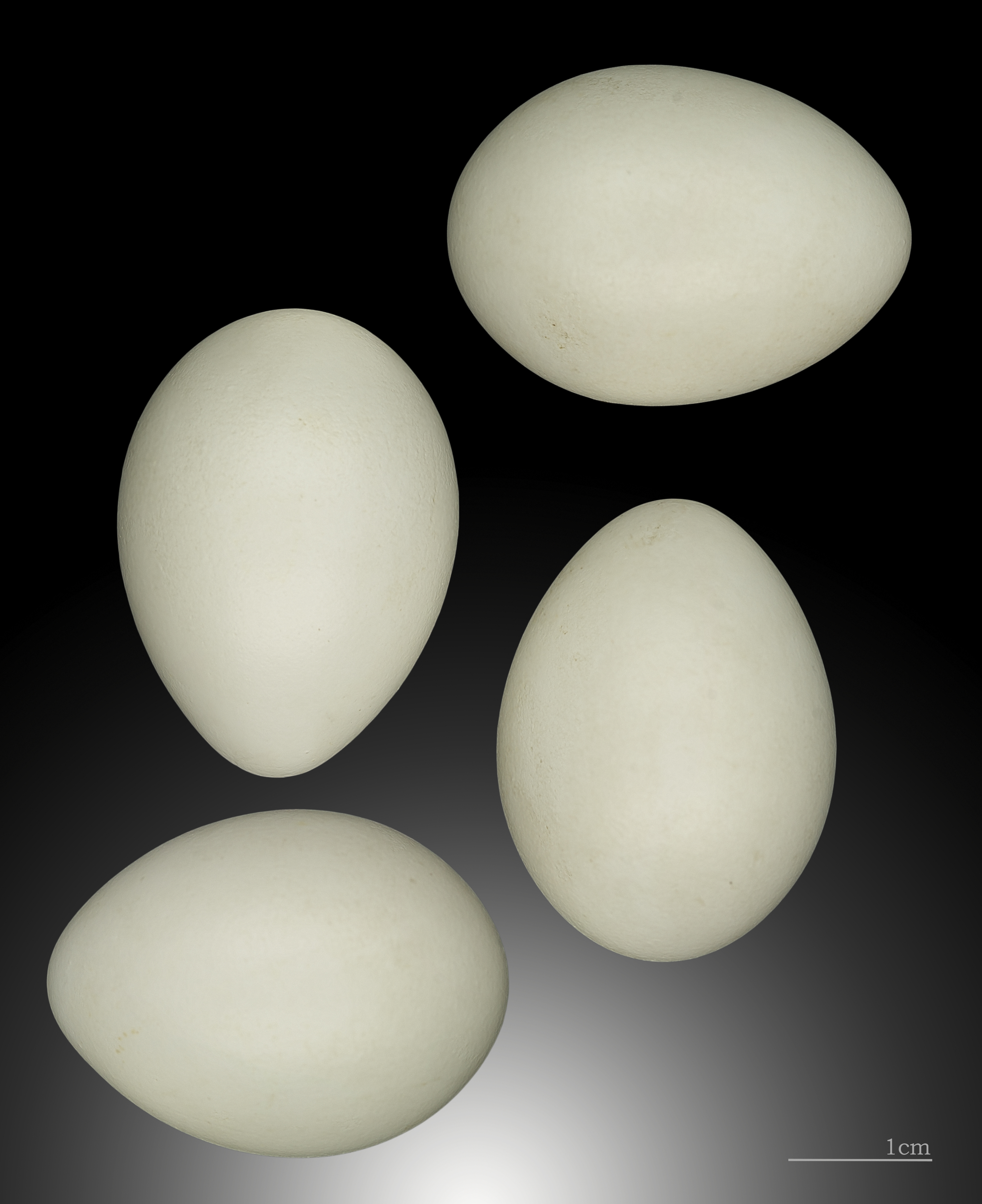
Eggs from the collection of the Museum de Toulouse

The white-winged snowfinch's food is mainly seeds with some insects. It is fearless, and will forage around ski resorts. It is hardy, and rarely descends below 1,000 metres (3,300 ft) even in hard winter weather.
