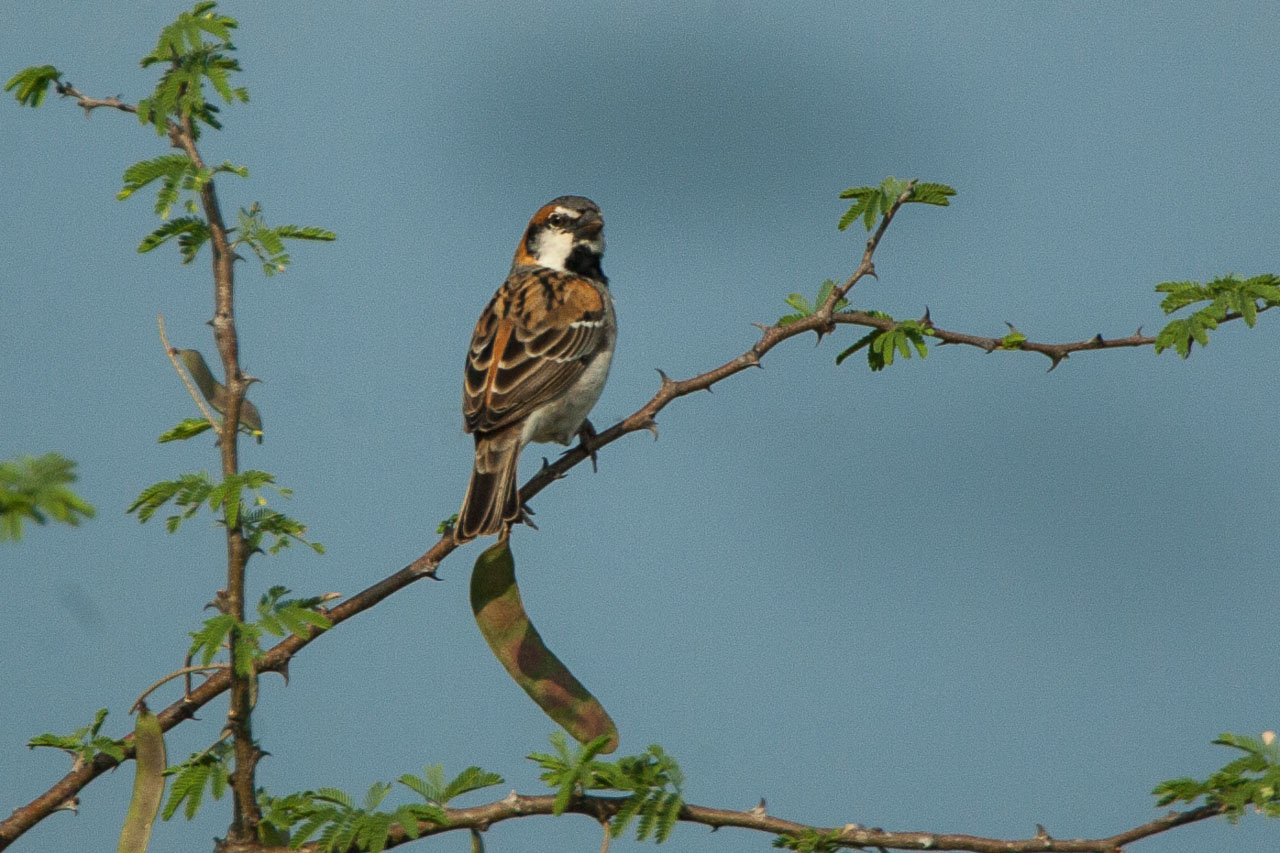
- A male in Murchison Falls National Park, Uganda

Conservation status
- Least Concern (IUCN 3.1)

Scientific classification
- Kingdom: Animalia
- Phylum: Chordata
- Class: Aves
- Order: Passeriformes
- Family: Passeridae
- Genus: Passer
- Species: P. shelleyi

Binomial name
- Passer shelleyi Sharpe, 1891

Synonyms
- List: Passer cordofanicus shelleyi; Passer iagoensis shelleyi; Passer motitensis shelleyi; Passer rufocinctus shelleyi

= Shelley's sparrow =

Species of bird

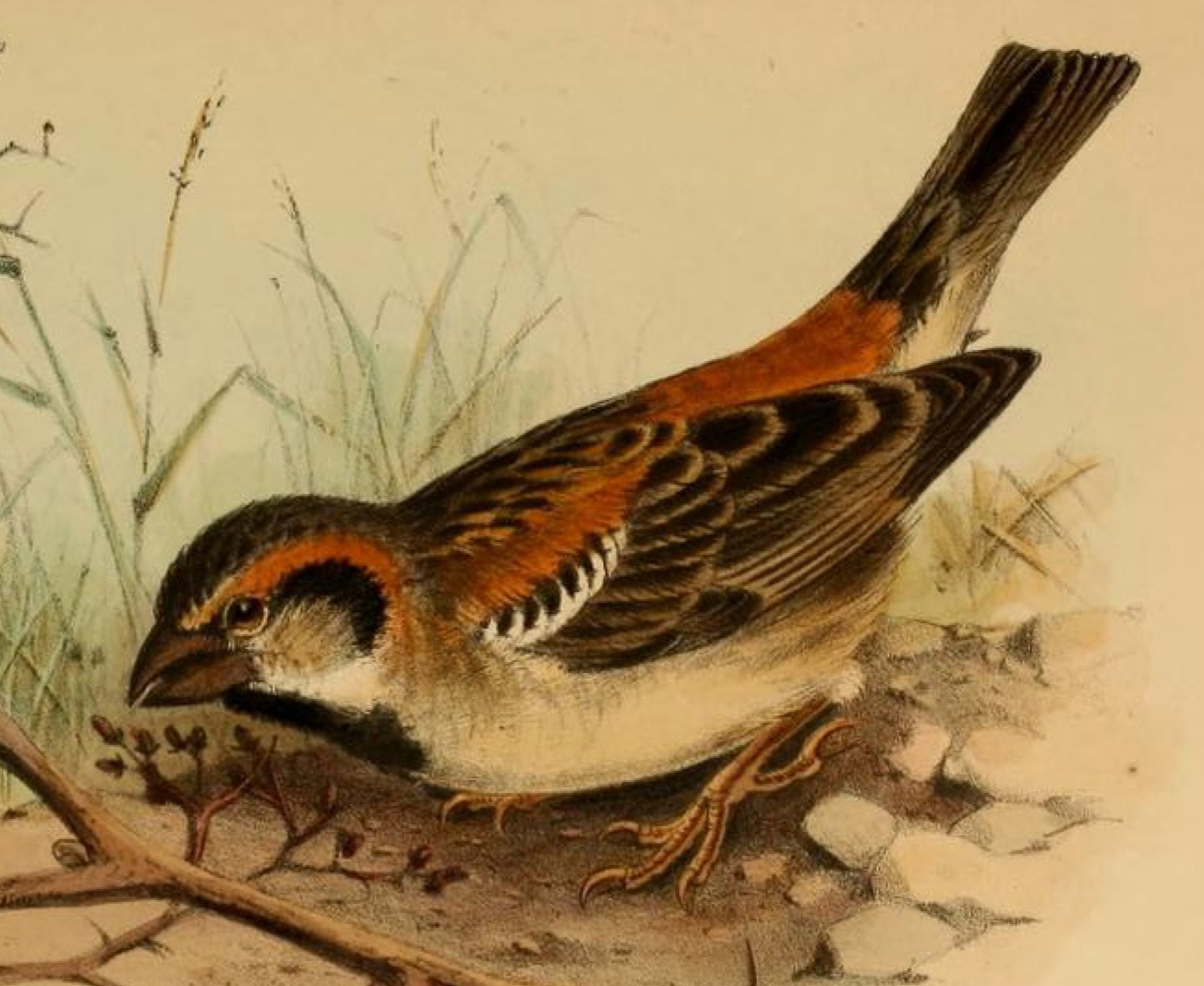
A detail of an illustration by Henrik Grönvold, showing a male Shelley's sparrow

Shelley's sparrow (Passer shelleyi), also known as Shelley's rufous sparrow or the White Nile rufous sparrow, is a sparrow found in eastern Africa from South Sudan, southern Ethiopia, and north-western Somalia to northern Uganda and north-western Kenya. Formerly, it was considered as a subspecies of the Kenya sparrow. This species is named after English geologist and ornithologist George Ernest Shelley.
