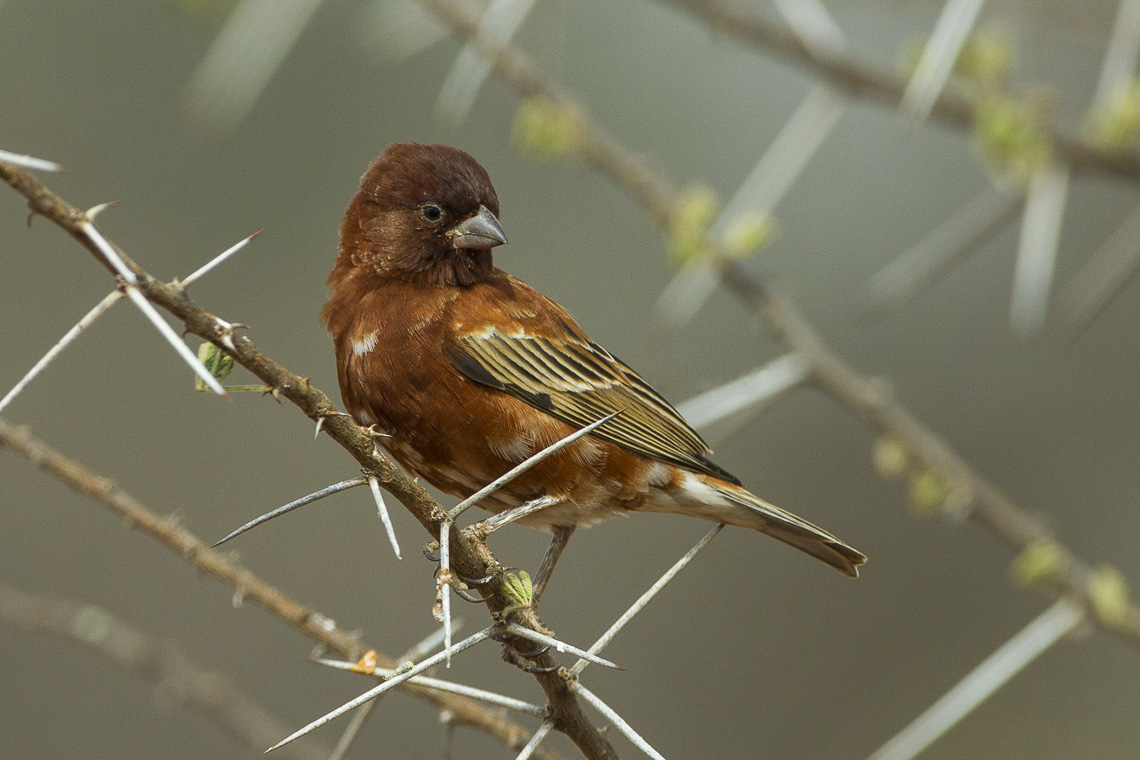
- Male in breeding plumage in Kenya

Conservation status
- Least Concern (IUCN 3.1)

Scientific classification
- Kingdom: Animalia
- Phylum: Chordata
- Class: Aves
- Order: Passeriformes
- Family: Passeridae
- Genus: Passer
- Species: P. eminibey

Binomial name
- Passer eminibey (Hartlaub, 1880)

Synonyms
- Sorella eminibey Hartlaub, 1880; Auripasser emini Reichenow, 1904; Passer luteus eminibey Meinertzhagen, 1954

= Chestnut sparrow =

Species of bird

The chestnut sparrow (Passer eminibey) is a species of passerine bird in the sparrow family Passeridae. It is the smallest member of the sparrow family, at about 11 cm (4.3 in) long. The breeding male has deep chestnut plumage and the female and juvenile are coloured a duller grey with some chestnut markings. Like its closest relatives in the genus Passer, the Arabian golden sparrow and the Sudan golden sparrow, it is gregarious and found in arid areas. Ranging through the east of Africa from Darfur in Sudan to Tanzania, it is found in dry savanna, papyrus swamps, and near human habitation. Adults and juveniles both feed mostly on grass seeds, and fly in flocks, often with other species of birds, to find food. It nests in trees, building its own domed nests, and also usurping the more elaborate nests of weavers.

== Taxonomy and systematics ==
From left to right, the Arabian golden sparrow, which has mostly yellow plumage, the Sudan golden sparrow, which is yellow with a brown back, and the brown chestnut sparrow

This species was first described in 1880, by Gustav Hartlaub in the Journal für Ornithologie, as Sorella Emini Bey. Hartlaub gave it the specific name Emini Bey in honour of the explorer Emin Pasha, who collected the type specimen in modern South Sudan or Uganda near Lado, and it is occasionally given the eponymous common name Emin Bey's sparrow. Hartlaub's unusual spelling of its specific epithet as two words led some to spell the name emini or emini-bey. No subspecies are recognised, but one was described by British ornithologist George L. G. Van Someren in 1922 from Archers Post in central Kenya, as Sorella eminibey guasso.

Hartlaub considered the chestnut sparrow's colouration and morphology to be distinct enough to allocate it to its own monotypic genus, Sorella. Although a few authors have followed Hartlaub's treatment, it is usually placed in the genus Passer. It is very similar to the two golden sparrows, from which it may have once been only clinally different. The male Arabian golden sparrow is almost entirely gold-coloured, the male chestnut sparrow is mostly chestnut, and the male Sudan golden sparrow is intermediate between the two. British ornithologist Richard Meinertzhagen considered these three species to be conspecific; however, the range of the Sudan golden sparrow overlaps with that of the chestnut sparrow without any known interbreeding in a small area of Sudan. These species are similar in their behaviour, which is adapted to the unpredictable conditions of their arid habitat. In particular, they and the Dead Sea sparrow share a courtship display in which males quiver their wings above their body. This intense display is probably an adaptation to nesting in a clump of trees surrounded by similar habitat, where such an intense display may serve important purposes in keeping a colony together.

The chestnut and golden sparrows have been seen as highly primitive among the genus Passer, only distantly related to the house sparrow and the related "Palaearctic black-bibbed sparrows". In recognition of this they are sometimes placed in a separate genus or subgenus Auripasser. The courtship display of the Dead Sea sparrow was thought to have evolved separately in a similar environment from that of these species, in an example of convergent evolution. However, mitochondrial DNA phylogenies indicate that the chestnut and golden sparrows are either derived from or are the closest relatives of the Palaearctic black-bibbed sparrows.

== Description ==
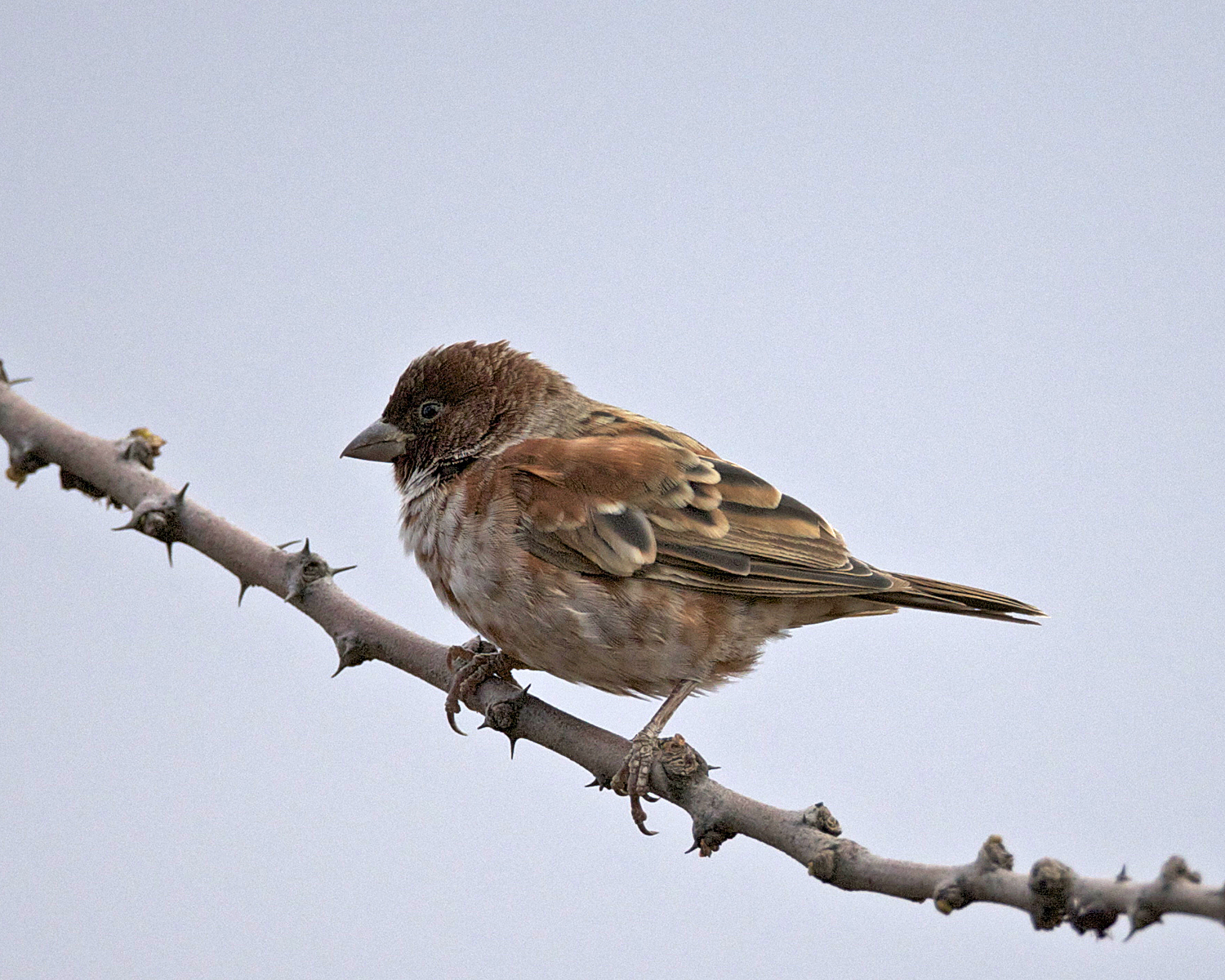
An immature male in Tanzania

Like the other members of the sparrow family, the chestnut sparrow is a small, chunky songbird with a thick bill suited to its diet of seeds. At 10.5 to 11.5 cm (4.1–4.5 in) in length, it is the smallest member of the sparrow family. It weighs between 12 grams (0.42 oz) and 17 grams (0.60 oz). Wing length ranges from 6.0 to 6.5 cm (2.4–2.6 in) in males and from 5.7 to 6.0 cm (2.2–2.4 in) in females. The tail, bill, and tarsus lengths are about 4 cm (1.6 in), 1 cm (0.39 in), and 1.5 cm (0.59 in) respectively.

The plumage of the breeding male is mostly a deep shade of chestnut in colour with black colouration on the face, wings, and tail. The breeding male is not easily confused with any other birds except the chestnut weaver, which is substantially larger and has white on its wings. The breeding male's legs and feet are horn (pale grey) in colour. The non-breeding male chestnut sparrow has white flecking on the upperparts, and much of its plumage is buff or whitish with chestnut crescent markings, until the bright chestnut of the breeding plumage is exposed by wear. The non-breeding male's bill fades to a dusky-tipped horn, similar to that of females, but without dusky tones on the cutting edge of the mandible (lower portion of beak).

Females have the same plumage pattern as males, though with somewhat duller colouration. The female has a grey head; buff supercilium, chin, and throat; black and warm brown upperparts; and off-white underparts. The bill of the female is pale yellow with the tip and cutting edge of mandible dusky. Juveniles are dull grey with a brown back, a pale yellow supercilium, and a pale horn bill. Females and juveniles have hints of chestnut on their supercilium, shoulders, and throat, by which they may be distinguished from other sparrows, such as the Kenya sparrow and the other rufous sparrows, which are common in much of the chestnut sparrow's range; or the house sparrow, which also occurs in parts of its range.

The basic call of the chestnut sparrow is a subdued chirp, with two recorded variations: a scolding threat call, rendered chrrrrit or chrrrrreeeerrrrrrrr and a chew chew flight call. Displaying males give a high twittering trill, rendered as tchiweeza tchiweeza tchi-tchi-tchi-tchi- see-see-see-seeichi.

== Distribution and habitat ==
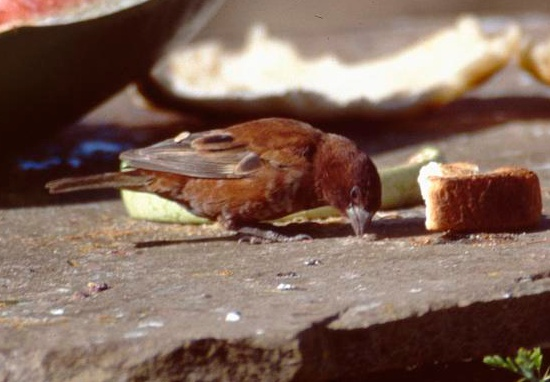
Male in breeding plumage feeding on scraps of food in Kenya

The chestnut sparrow is found in East Africa in mostly lower country from Darfur through Kordofan, South Sudan, Somalia, Uganda, and Kenya to north-central Tanzania. Its range also extends northeast into the southwest and Great Rift Valley of Ethiopia. Like the golden sparrows, it is sometimes nomadic when not breeding. Vagrants have been recorded as far from their breeding range as Dar es Salaam. It is found mostly in dry savanna and in fields and villages, but unlike its relations the golden sparrows, it is sometimes found in swamps of papyrus (certain Cyperus spp.). Its population has not been quantified, but it appears to be common across a very large range and it is assessed by the IUCN Red List as Least Concern for global extinction.

== Behaviour and ecology ==
Chestnut sparrows are gregarious, and are only occasionally found away from flocks. They frequently associate with queleas and other weavers. Adults feed on grass seeds, and those near human habitations will also eat crumbs and other household scraps. Nestlings are fed mostly softer grass seeds, and small beetles are also recorded in their diet.

=== Breeding ===
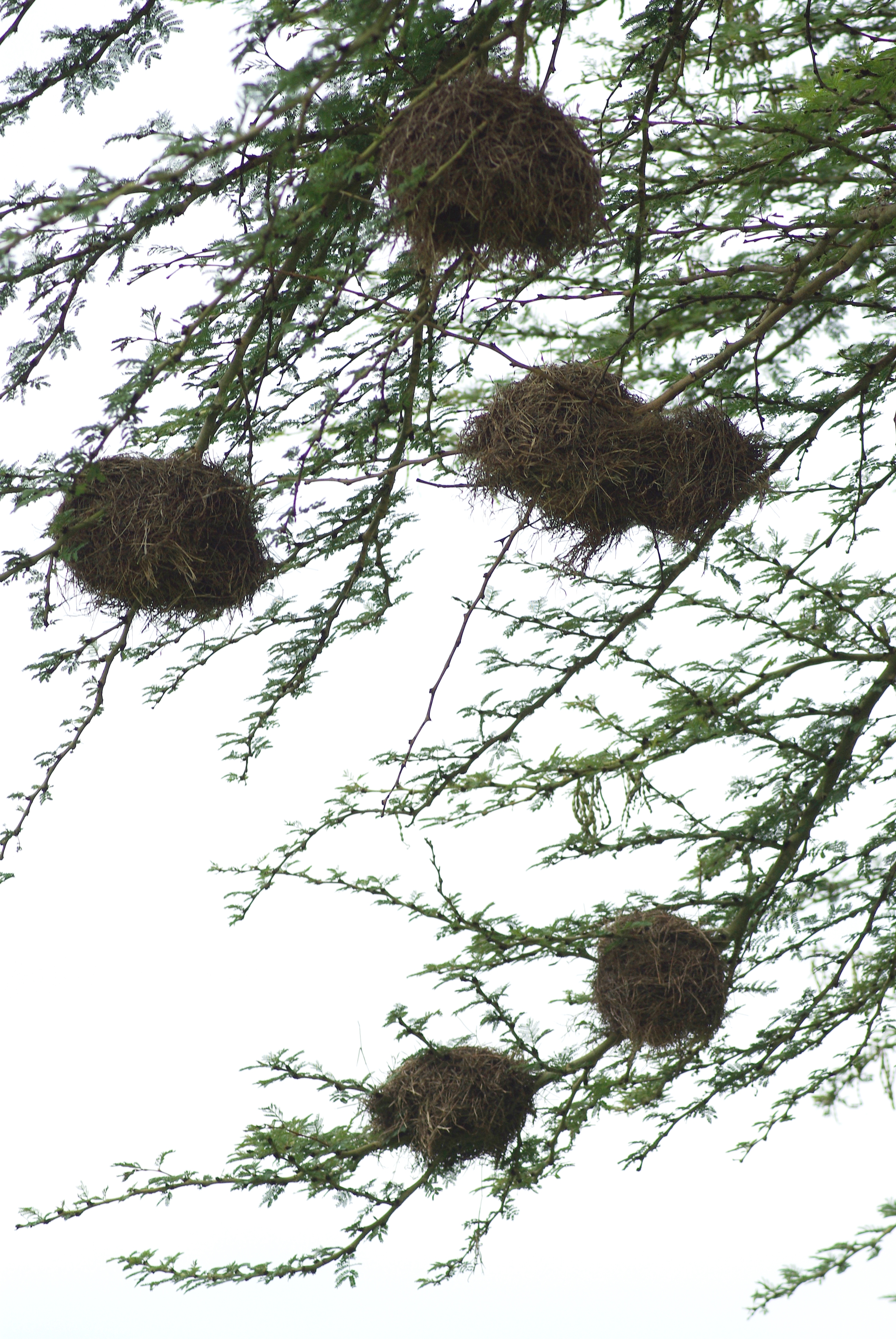
Grey-capped social weaver nests in Kenya

The nesting behaviour of the chestnut sparrow chestnut sparrow has been the subject of confusion. Early reports described the chestnut sparrow's nest as being a typical sparrow nest built in a tree; later it was reported that chestnut sparrows had elaborate nests like those of weavers. In 1967, the ornithologist Robert B. Payne studied chestnut sparrows in a grey-capped social weaver colony in an acacia grove near Lake Magadi in southern Kenya, and in 1969 he reported his findings in the ornithological journal The Ibis. Payne found that chestnut sparrows only nested by usurping the nests of the social-weavers. After reporting this, and noting that the distribution of the chestnut sparrow closely coincides with that of the social-weavers of the genus Pseudonigrita, Payne suggested that the chestnut sparrow was an obligate nest parasite (not a brood parasite, like many Old World cuckoos and cowbirds). Payne also noted in his paper that "Nest parasitism is generally thought to have been a stage in the evolutionary development of brood parasitism", an idea that remains accepted, and suggested the chestnut sparrow could be evolving towards obligate brood parasitism. However, it is known that besides parasitising the nests of weavers or using their abandoned nests, the chestnut sparrow also builds its own nests. Nests built by the chestnut sparrow, like most sparrow nests, are untidy domed structures which are made of grass and lined with feathers. Its breeding season varies between different regions, following rains, and the breeding seasons of its hosts in areas where it parasitises nests; as a result it has been recorded breeding in every month of the year across its range.

At Payne's study locality the breeding season of the chestnut sparrow lagged behind that of its host. The sparrows began courting when the weavers started constructing their elaborate nests. Once the breeding season began, "the first impression was of the sparrows nesting and the grey-capped social weavers unobtrusively skulking nearby". Males displayed around the new weaver nests, crouching, raising and quivering their wings in a shallow V, and giving a high, twittering trill. The males were chased by the social-weavers, but returned persistently, until joined by females. When a female came near a displaying male, the male would increase his rate of wing quivering, spread and depress his tail, and bow down his head, until his body formed an arc. This exaggerated display may be an adaptation related to pair formation in the absence of male nest-building, and it may also serve to focus attention in breeding colonies and keep the birds in a colony together, as colonies are in clumps of trees surrounded by similar habitat.

During Payne's study, copulation was seen only in the acacias, around the social-weaver nests. Females would fly to displaying males and solicit copulation in typical sparrow fashion, crouching, quivering, and drooping their wings. When males saw displaying females, they would fly to them and mount them immediately. Males continued their wing quivering during copulation, and females would crouch, quiver, raise their head, and hold their tails horizontally. After a copulation the female would fly off and the male would continue displaying. During this courtship and afterwards, males and mated pairs would interfere with the social-weavers' nest building, until they drove the social-weavers out. During Payne's study period, "Chases and fights between the two species were seen nearly every minute of observation", and the male sparrows spent about a fifth of their day annoying the social-weavers. Little is recorded of incubation and fledging periods in the wild. In captivity the incubation period lasts for 18 to 19 days. Clutches typically contain three or four eggs, which are ovular, mostly coloured white or bluish-white. Some observations indicate that nestlings are fed by the female alone.
