= Golden sparrow =

Golden sparrow may refer to:

- Sudan golden sparrow or golden song sparrow, a bird
- Arabian golden sparrow, a bird
- Golden Sparrow, a character played by Liu Yifei in the 2008 film The Forbidden Kingdom
- "Golden Sparrow", a song by G. V. Prakash Kumar, Dhanush, Sublahshini and Arivu from the 2025 Indian film Nilavuku En Mel Ennadi Kobam
