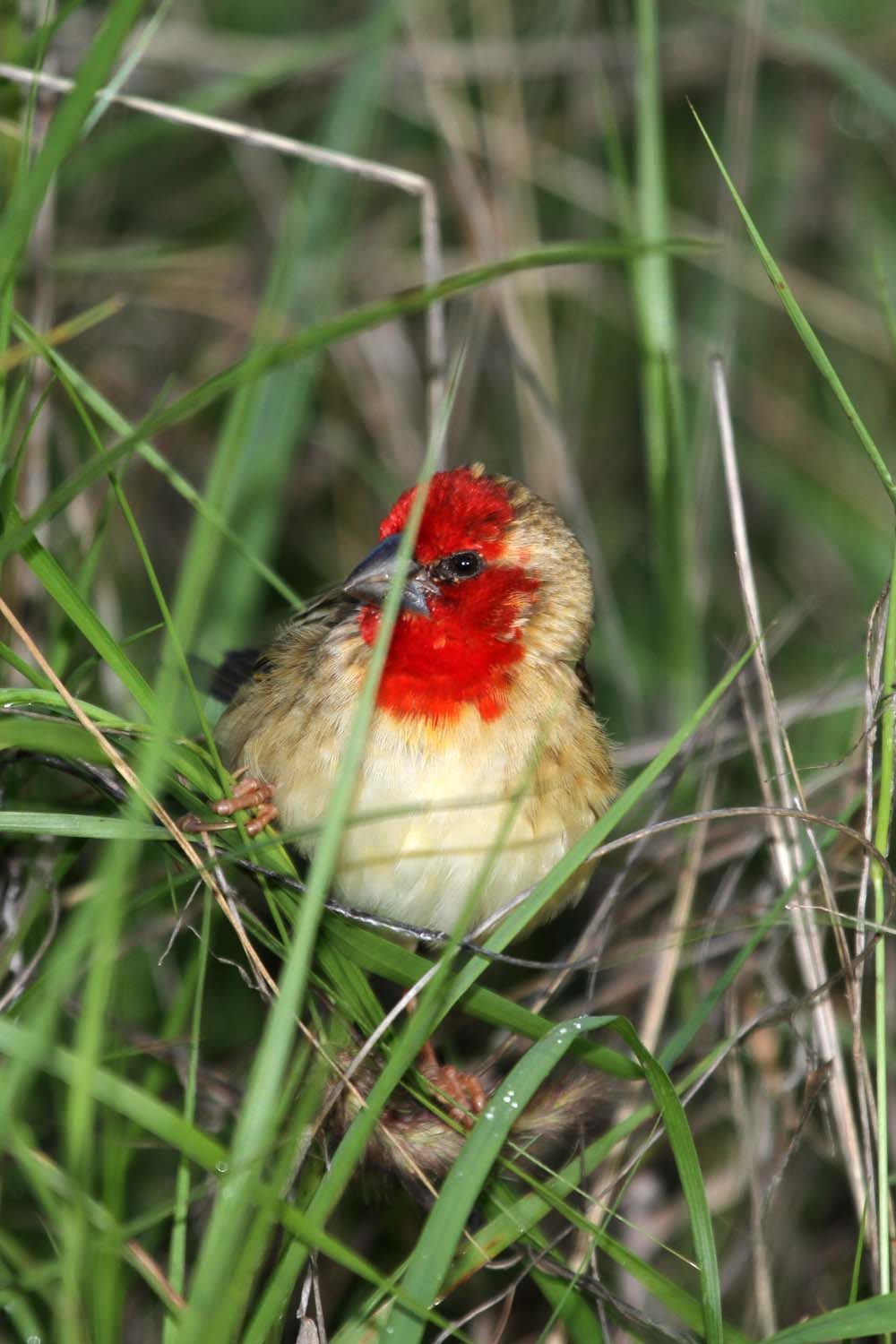

Conservation status
- Least Concern (IUCN 3.1)

Scientific classification
- Kingdom: Animalia
- Phylum: Chordata
- Class: Aves
- Order: Passeriformes
- Family: Ploceidae
- Genus: Quelea
- Species: Q. cardinalis

Binomial name
- Quelea cardinalis (Hartlaub, 1880)

= Cardinal quelea =

Species of bird

The cardinal quelea (Quelea cardinalis) is a species of bird in the family Ploceidae. It is found in Burundi, Democratic Republic of the Congo, Ethiopia, Kenya, Malawi, Rwanda, South Sudan, Tanzania, Uganda, and Zambia.

== Description ==
The cardinal quelea is a small (about 10 centimetres or 3.9 inches long) sparrow-like bird with a short heavy black bill, that breeds in colonies. The male in breeding plumage has a red head extending onto the breast but not onto the streaked nape. The female has a yellowish face, brow stripes and throat. The non-breeding plumage of the male resembles that of the female, but retains some red on its head.

== Taxonomy ==
Gustav Hartlaub was the first to describe the cardinal quelea, giving it the scientific name Hyphantica cardinalis in 1880, based on specimens that were collected by Emin Pasha near Lado in South-Sudan during 1879. In 1951, Hans von Boetticher regarded the cardinal quelea and red-headed quelea sufficiently different from the red-billed quelea to create a new genus Queleopsis. Its name in Swahili is kwelea kidari-chekundu.

=== Phylogeny ===
Based on recent DNA-analysis, the red-headed quelea forms a clade with the cardinal quelea, and this clade is sister to the red-billed quelea Q. quelea. The genus Quelea belongs to the group of true weavers (subfamily Ploceinae), and is most related to Foudia, a genus of six or seven species that occur on the islands of the western Indian Ocean. This clade is sister to the Asian species of the genus Ploceus. The following tree represents current insights in the relationships between the species of Quelea, and their closest relatives.

- - - genus Quelea
      - Q. quelea
      - - Q. cardinalis
        - Q. erythrops
    - genus Foudia
  - Asian species of the genus Ploceus
