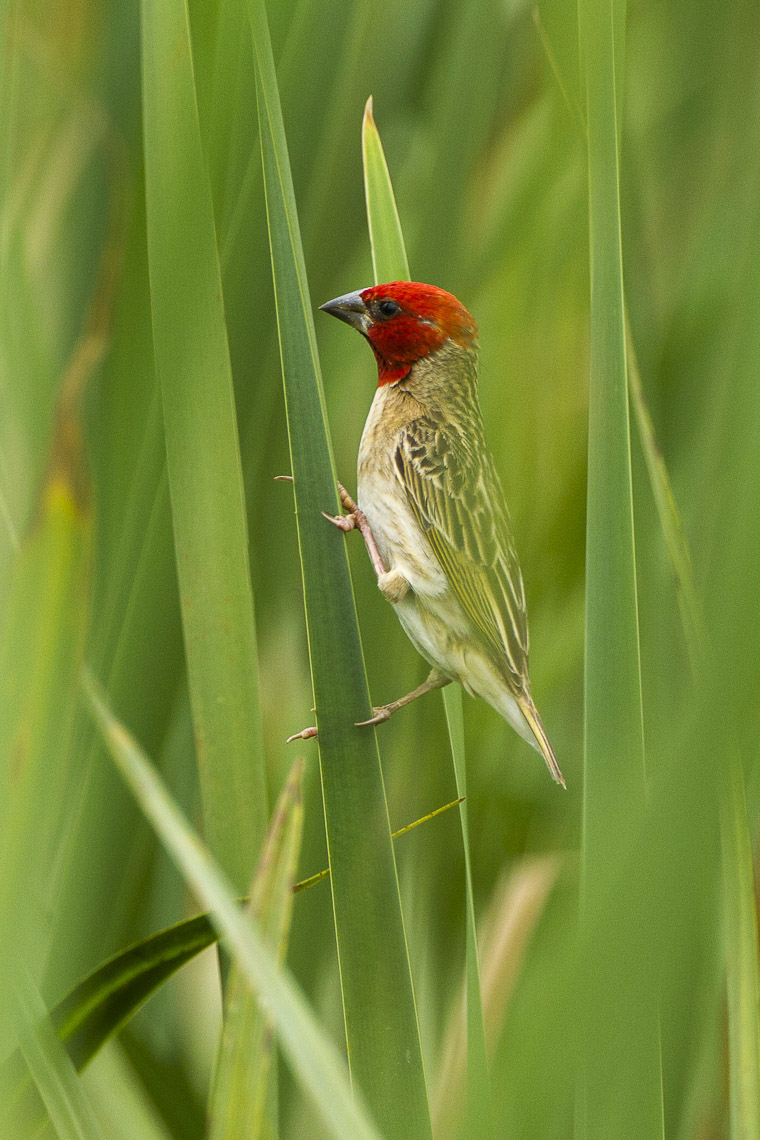

Conservation status
- Least Concern (IUCN 3.1)

Scientific classification
- Kingdom: Animalia
- Phylum: Chordata
- Class: Aves
- Order: Passeriformes
- Family: Ploceidae
- Genus: Quelea
- Species: Q. erythrops

Binomial name
- Quelea erythrops (Hartlaub, 1848)

= Red-headed quelea =

Species of bird

The red-headed quelea (Quelea erythrops) is a species of bird in the family Ploceidae. It is found in Angola, Benin, Botswana, Burkina Faso, Burundi, Cameroon, Central African Republic, Chad, Republic of the Congo, Democratic Republic of the Congo, Ivory Coast, Equatorial Guinea, Eswatini, Ethiopia, Gabon, Gambia, Ghana, Guinea, Guinea-Bissau, Kenya, Liberia, Malawi, Mali, Mozambique, Niger, Nigeria, Rwanda, São Tomé and Príncipe, Senegal, Sierra Leone, South Africa, South Sudan, Tanzania, Togo, Uganda, Zambia, and Zimbabwe.

== Taxonomy and naming ==
The red-headed quelea was collected by Carl Weiss on Sao Tome island in 1847, and after its arrival at the Hamburg Museum described for science for the first time by Gustav Hartlaub in 1848, who named it Ploceus erythrops. In 1951, Hans von Boetticher regarded the cardinal quelea and red-headed quelea sufficiently different from the red-billed quelea to create a new genus Queleopsis.

The species epithet erythrops derives from the Greek word ἐρυθρός (eruthros), meaning "red" and ὄψ (ops) meaning "eye" or "face", referring to the rufous or red face. Ludwig Reichenbach gave the species its first English name in 1863: red-headed dioch. Other vernacular names in the English language include pokerhead, and red-headed weaver. Its vernacular name in Swahili is kwelea kichwa-chekundu.

=== Phylogeny ===
Based on recent DNA-analysis, the red-headed quelea forms a clade with the cardinal quelea (Q. cardinalis), and this clade is sister to the red-billed quelea Q. quelea. The genus Quelea belongs to the group of true weavers (subfamily Ploceinae), and is most related to Foudia, a genus of six or seven species that occur on the islands of the western Indian Ocean. This clade is sister to the Asian species of the genus Ploceus. The following tree represents current insight of the relationships between the species of Quelea, and their closest relatives.

- - - genus Quelea
      - Q. quelea
      - - Q. cardinalis
        - Q. erythrops
    - genus Foudia
  - Asian species of the genus Ploceus
