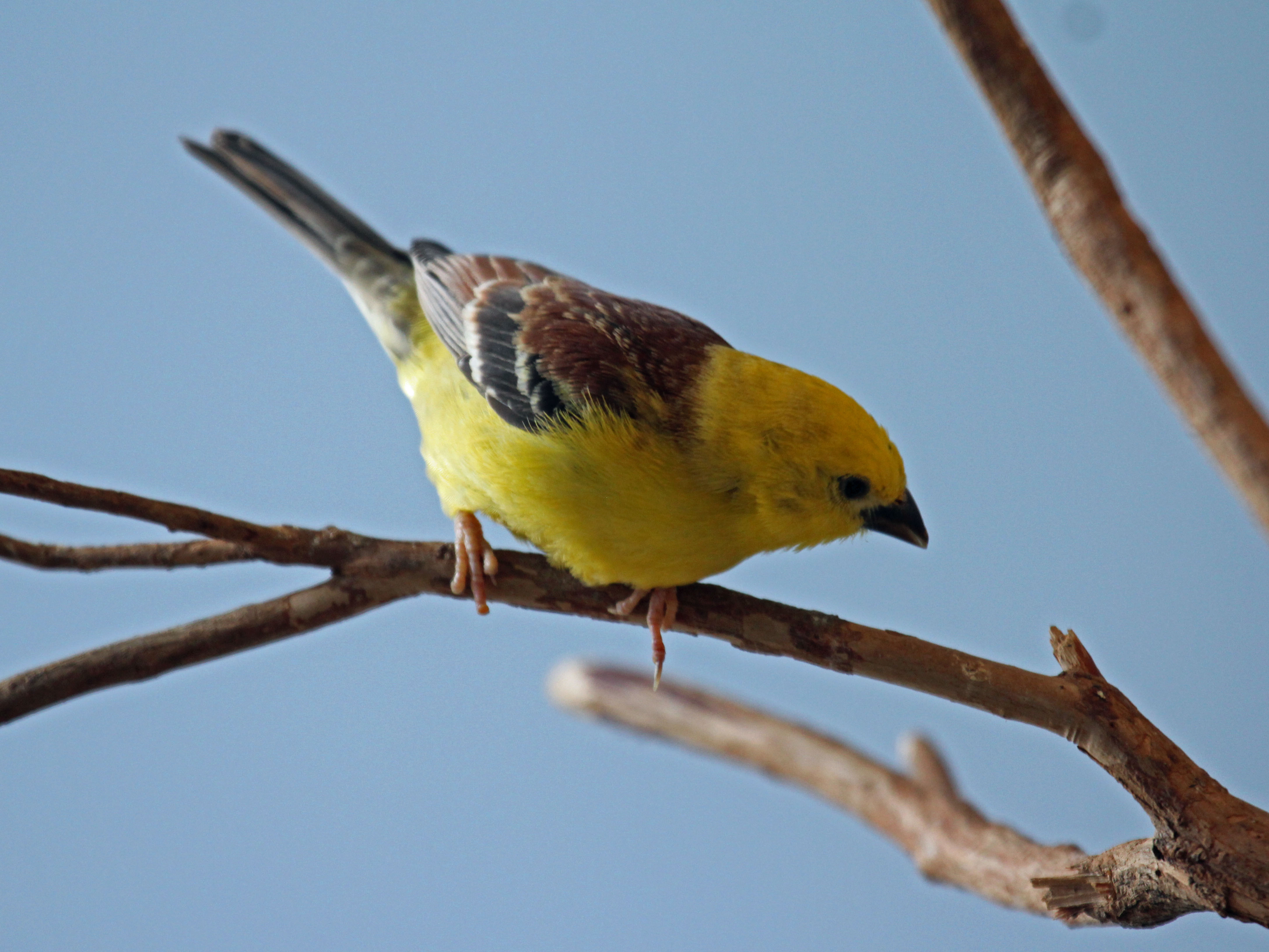
- A male in the National Aviary, Pittsburgh, U.S.

Conservation status
- Least Concern (IUCN 3.1)

Scientific classification
- Kingdom: Animalia
- Phylum: Chordata
- Class: Aves
- Order: Passeriformes
- Family: Passeridae
- Genus: Passer
- Species: P. luteus

Binomial name
- Passer luteus (Lichtenstein, MHC, 1823)

Synonyms
- Fringilla lutea Lichtenstein, 1823

= Sudan golden sparrow =

Species of bird

The Sudan golden sparrow (Passer luteus) is a small species of bird in the sparrow family found in sub-Saharan Africa. It is a famous cage bird, and in aviculture, it is known as the golden song sparrow. The Arabian golden sparrow and this species are sometimes considered one species, as the "golden sparrow".

== Taxonomy and systematics ==
From left to right, the mostly yellow Arabian golden sparrow, the Sudan golden sparrow, which is yellow with a brown back, and the brown chestnut sparrow

This species was first described by Martin Lichtenstein in 1823, as Fringilla lutea, from a specimen collected at Dongola, Sudan. Since then it has generally been placed in the genus Passer. The species name luteus means saffron yellow in Latin.

The two golden sparrows are very similar, and have often been treated as the same species. Both are similar to the chestnut sparrow, and all three may once have been only clinally different. The male Arabian golden sparrow is almost entirely gold-coloured, the male chestnut sparrow is mostly chestnut, and the male Sudan golden sparrow is intermediate. British ornithologist Richard Meinertzhagen considered even the chestnut sparrow to be conspecific, though the range of the Sudan golden sparrow overlaps with that of the chestnut sparrow without any known interbreeding in a small area of Darfur. The three species are similar in their behaviour, which is adapted to the unpredictable conditions of their arid habitat. In particular, they and the Dead Sea sparrow share a courtship display in which males quiver their wings above their body. This intense display is probably an adaptation to nesting in a clump of trees surrounded by similar habitat, where such an intense display may serve important purposes in keeping a colony together.

The golden sparrows and chestnut sparrow have been seen as highly primitive among the genus Passer, only distantly related to the house sparrow and the related "Palaearctic black-bibbed sparrows". In recognition of this they are sometimes placed in a separate genus or subgenus Auripasser, or a superspecies. The courtship display of the Dead Sea sparrow was thought to have evolved separately in a similar environment from that of these species, in an example of convergent evolution.

== Description ==
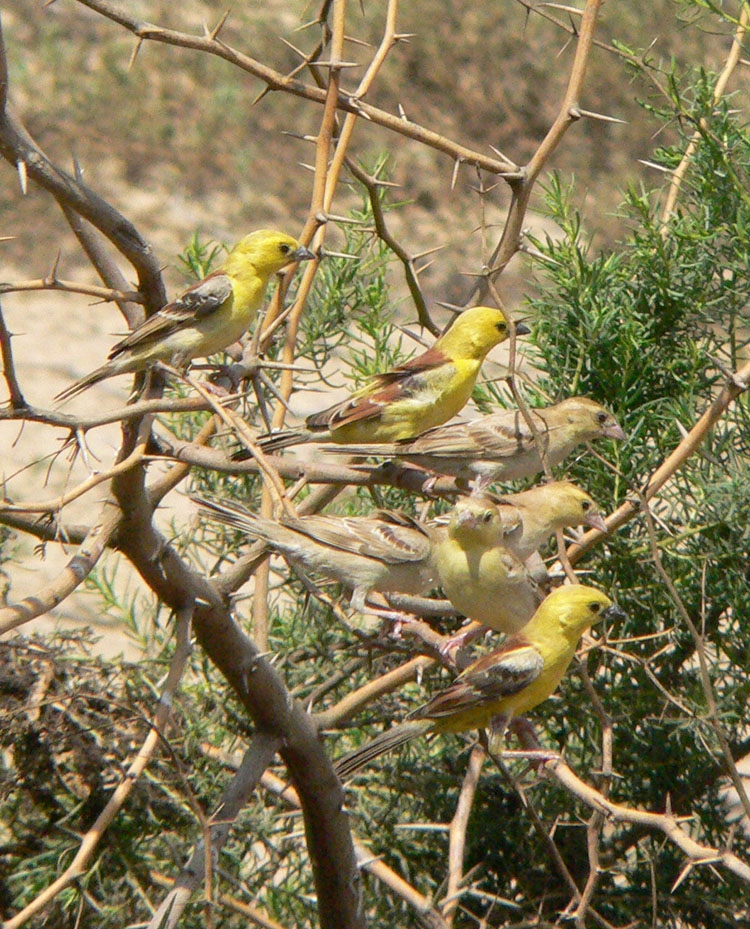
A flock with males and females near the Red Sea in Sudan

The Sudan golden sparrow is a smaller sparrow, at 12–13 cm (4.5–5 in) in length, with a wingspan of 5.7–7 cm (2.2–2.8 in). Males are distinctive in their bright yellow head and underparts, deep chestnut brown wings and back, and two white wingbars. In the breeding season the male's plumage is brighter still, and the bill changes colour from horn to shiny black. Females are pale sandy-buff with yellowish face, light brown wings, a back faintly streaked with chestnut, and pale yellow fading to whitish on the underparts. Juveniles are similar to females, but greyer. About 10 weeks after hatching young males may start to get a yellow wash around the shoulder area. Its basic call is a chirp or tchirrup, similar to that of other sparrows. Variations include a song-like call, and a rapid rhythmic che-che-che.

== Distribution and habitat ==
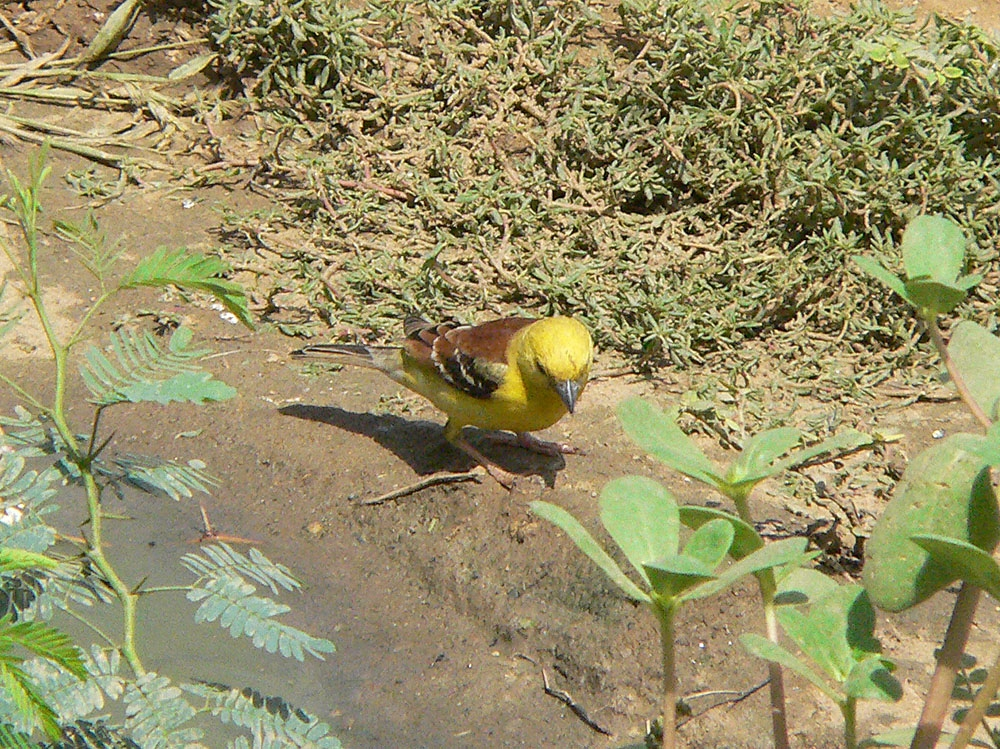
A male near the Red Sea in Sudan

It breeds across Africa to the south of the Sahara from Senegal east to Sudan and Ethiopia. In April 2009 a flock of seven was found to the north-west of Aousserd, Morocco. Two birds were seen in 2013 and a few more in 2014. It is a bird of dry open savanna, semi-desert, arid scrub and cereal cultivation.

== Behaviour and ecology ==
The Sudan golden sparrow is a highly gregarious and nomadic bird and will form mixed flocks with other seed-eating birds, such as red-billed quelea, and other sparrows. Evening roosts, often in cities like Khartoum, may number hundreds of thousands of birds. It eats seeds and takes some insects, especially when feeding young. It prefers grass seeds, including smaller cereal seeds, such as those of millet. In captivity it is fed the mixture of foxtail millet and other grains with vegetables, mealworms, and other supplements usually fed to weavers.

It breeds in very large colonies, of as many as 65,000 nests. The nest is a very large, untidy, domed built of twigs made in tree branches, with a feather-lined nest chamber. One or two clutches a year are laid, typically of three or four eggs. Eggs are white with dark spots.
