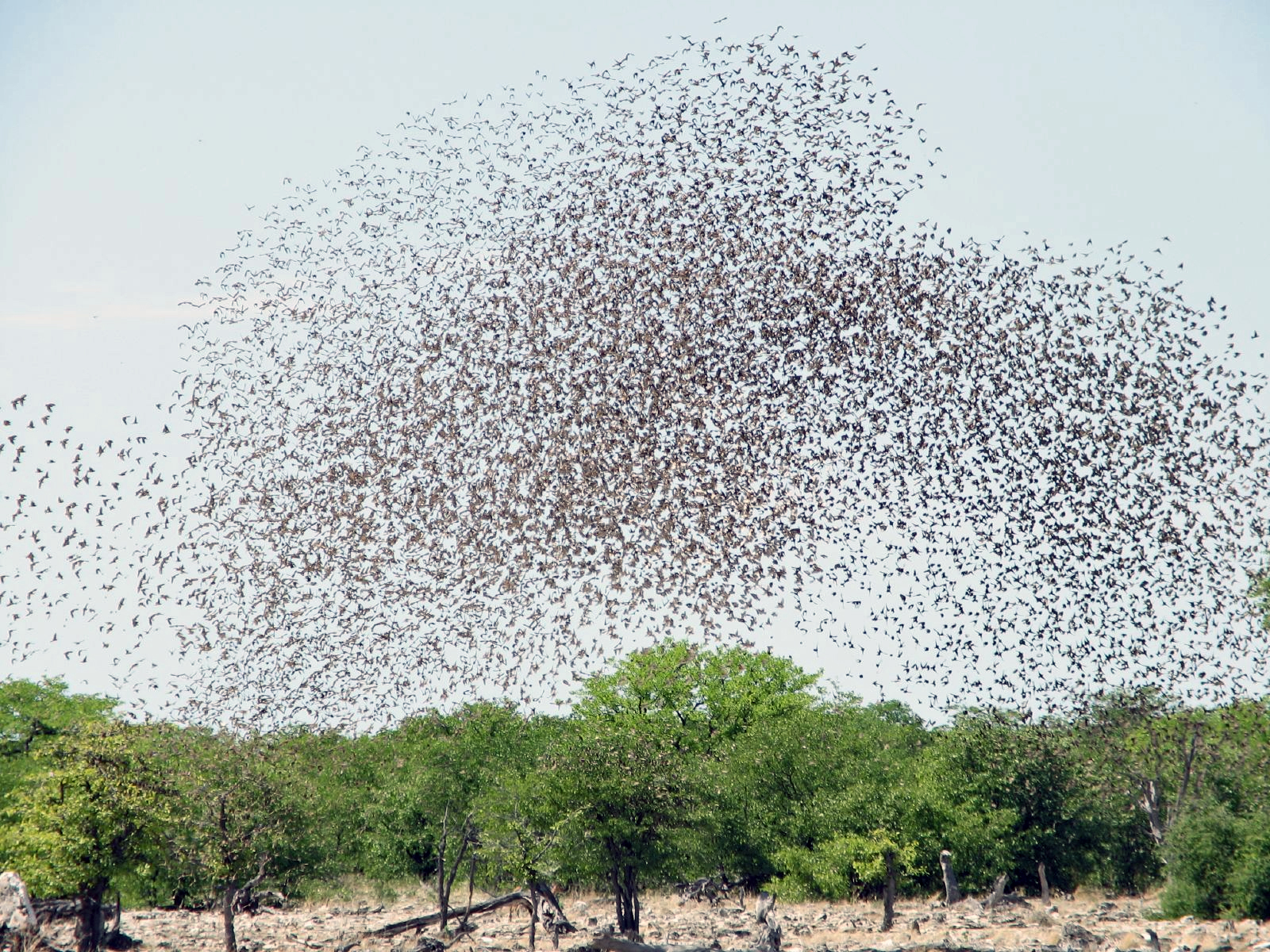
- Red-billed quelea (Quelea quelea)

Scientific classification
- Kingdom: Animalia
- Phylum: Chordata
- Class: Aves
- Order: Passeriformes
- Family: Ploceidae
- Genus: Quelea; Reichenbach, 1850

Type species
- Loxia sanguinirostris Linnaeus, 1766

Species
- Quelea cardinalis Quelea erythrops Quelea quelea

= Quelea =

Genus of African birds

Quelea (/ˈkwiːliə/) is a genus of small passerine birds that belongs to the weaver family Ploceidae, confined to Africa. These are small-sized, sparrow- or finch-like gregarious birds, with bills adapted to eating seeds. Queleas may be nomadic over vast ranges; the red-billed quelea is said to be the most numerous wild bird species in the world and is a major pest to small-grain cereal crops in much of sub-Saharan Africa.

== Taxonomy ==
There are three species:

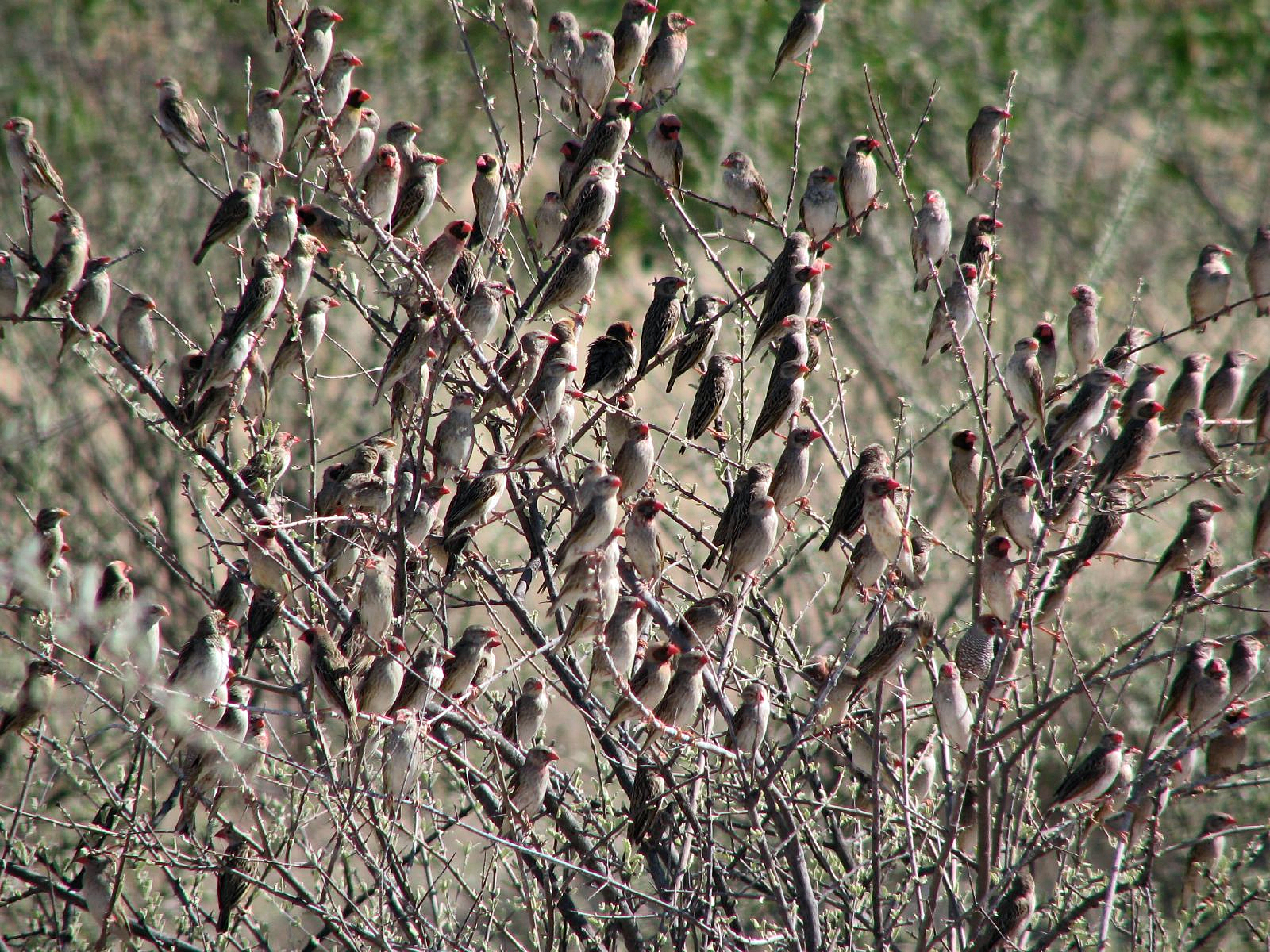
A flock of red-billed queleas

Genus Quelea – Reichenbach, 1850 – three species
Common name	Scientific name and subspecies	Range	Size and ecology	IUCN status and estimated population
Cardinal quelea	Quelea cardinalis (Hartlaub, 1880)	Burundi, Democratic Republic of the Congo, Ethiopia, Kenya, Malawi, Rwanda, South Sudan, Tanzania, Uganda, and Zambia.	Size: Habitat: Diet:	LC
Red-headed quelea	Quelea erythrops (Hartlaub, 1848)	Angola, Benin, Botswana, Burkina Faso, Burundi, Cameroon, Central African Republic, Chad, Republic of the Congo, Democratic Republic of the Congo, Ivory Coast, Equatorial Guinea, Ethiopia, Gabon, Gambia, Ghana, Guinea, Guinea-Bissau, Kenya, Liberia, Malawi, Mali, Mozambique, Niger, Nigeria, Rwanda, São Tomé and Príncipe, Senegal, Sierra Leone, South Africa, South Sudan, Swaziland, Tanzania, Togo, Uganda, Zambia, and Zimbabwe.	Size: Habitat: Diet:	LC
Red-billed quelea Male Female	Quelea quelea (Linnaeus, 1758) Three subspecies: Quelea quelea quelea; Quelea quelea lathamii; Quelea queleaaethiopica	Subsaharan Africa, but absent from Madagascar, and avoiding rainforest, high altitude and South Africa's south coast	Size: Habitat: Diet:	LC

=== Phylogeny ===
Based on recent DNA-analysis, the red-billed quelea is sister to a clade that consist of both remaining species of the genus Quelea, namely Q. cardinalis and Q. erythrops. The genus belongs to the group of true weavers (subfamily Ploceinae), and is most related to Foudia, a genus of six or seven species that occur on the islands of the western Indian Ocean. This clade is sister to the Asian species of the genus Ploceus.

The following tree represents current insight of the relationships between the species of Quelea, and their closest relatives.

- - - genus Quelea
      - Q. quelea
      - - Q. cardinalis
        - Q. erythrops
    - genus Foudia
  - Asian species of the genus Ploceus

== Impact on agriculture ==
Q. quelea is a major pest to small-grain cereal crops in much of sub-Saharan Africa; the kernels of corn are too big for it. Q. erythrops may cause substantial damage to rice. Q. cardinalis is not known to raid crops.
