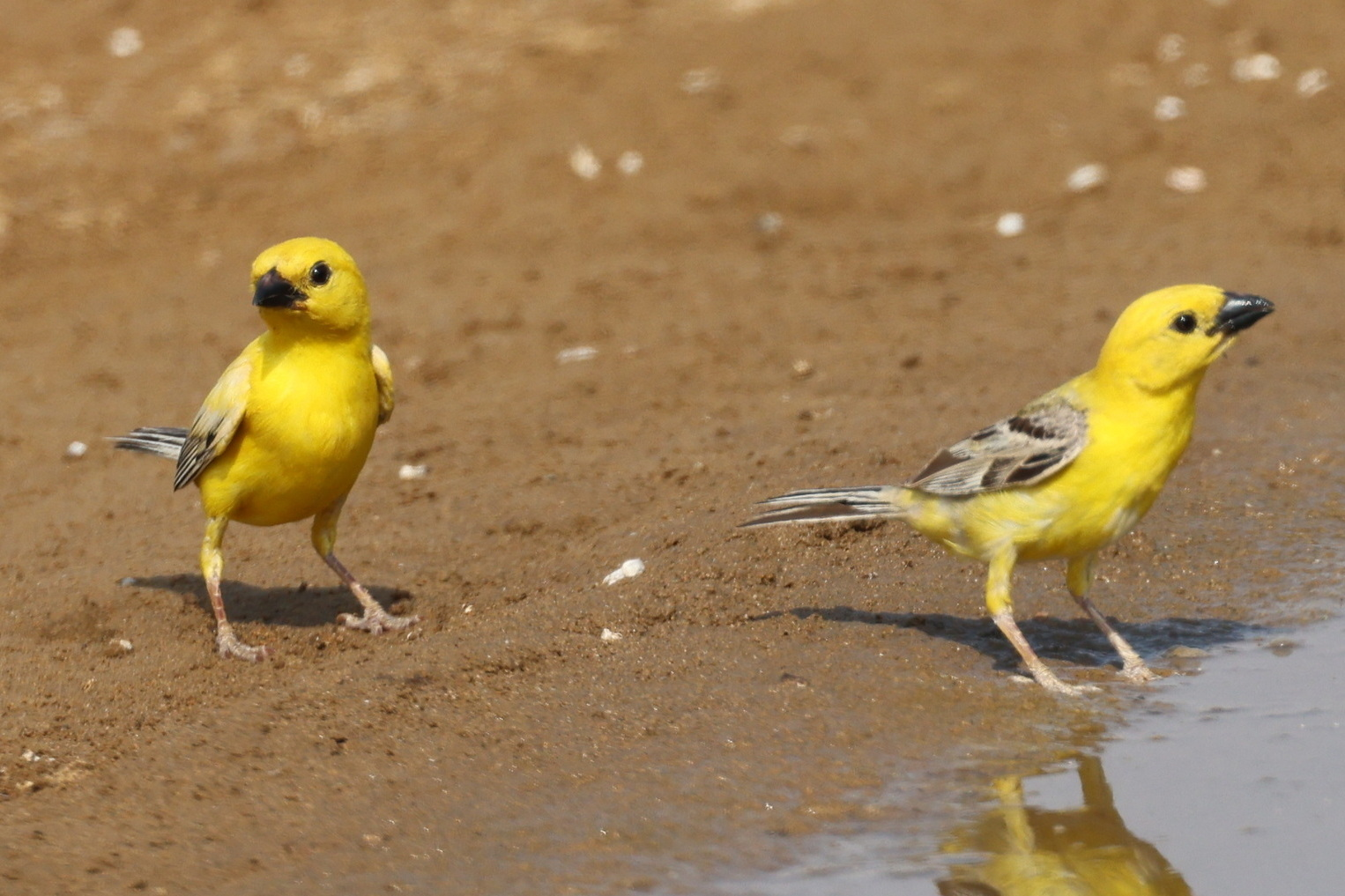

Conservation status
- Least Concern (IUCN 3.1)

Scientific classification
- Kingdom: Animalia
- Phylum: Chordata
- Class: Aves
- Order: Passeriformes
- Family: Passeridae
- Genus: Passer
- Species: P. euchlorus

Binomial name
- Passer euchlorus (Bonaparte, 1850)

Synonyms
- Auripasser euchlorus; Auripasser luteus euchlorus; Passer luteus euchlorus

= Arabian golden sparrow =

Species of bird

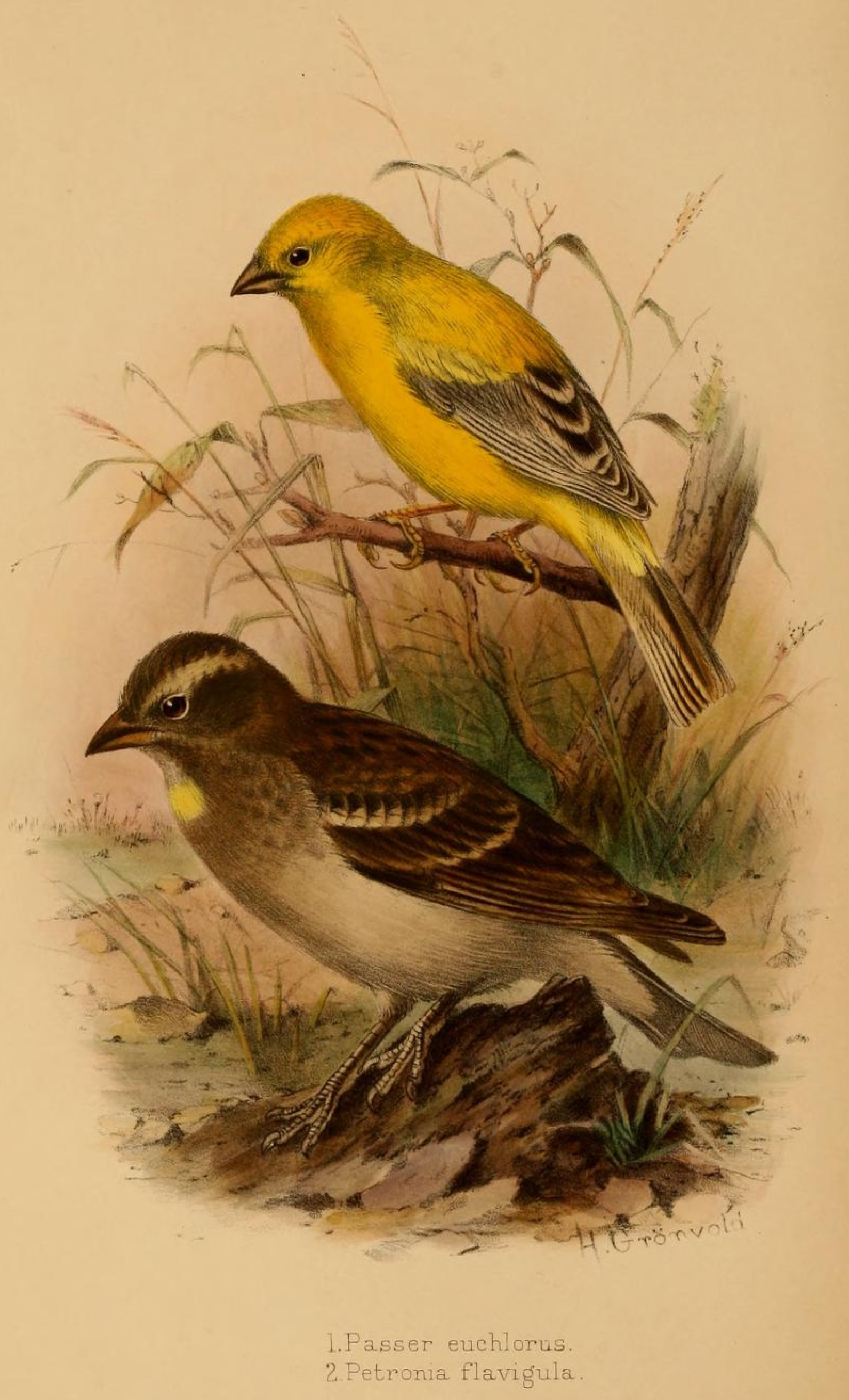
An illustration of an Arabian golden sparrow (above) and a yellow-throated petronia (below) by Henrik Grönvold

The Arabian golden sparrow (Passer euchlorus) is a sparrow found in south west Arabia and also the coast of Somalia and Djibouti where it occurs in thorn savannah and scrub habitats. It is sometimes considered as a subspecies of the Sudan golden sparrow (Passer luteus).

It is sometimes kept as a pet.
