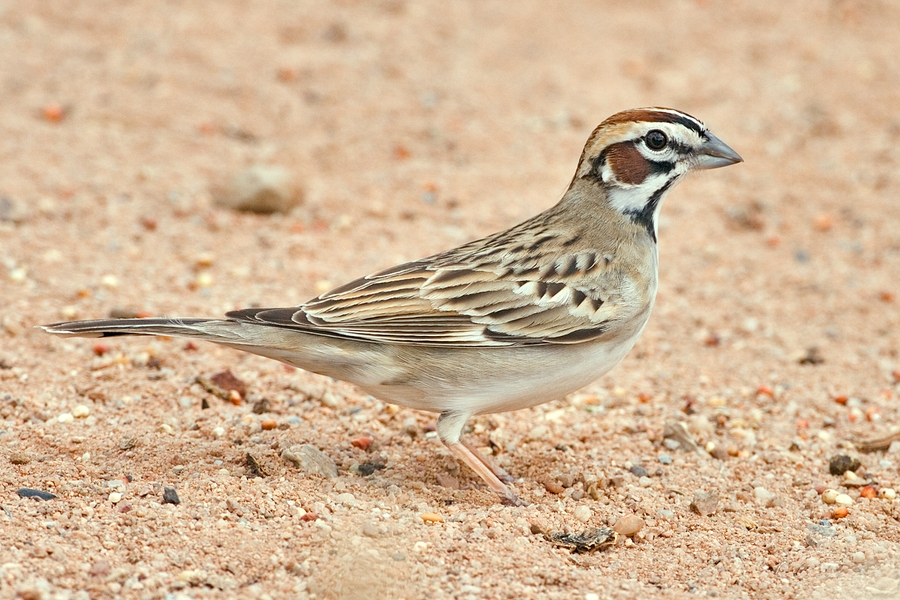

Conservation status
- Least Concern (IUCN 3.1)

Scientific classification
- Kingdom: Animalia
- Phylum: Chordata
- Class: Aves
- Order: Passeriformes
- Family: Passerellidae
- Genus: Chondestes; Swainson, 1827
- Species: C. grammacus

Binomial name
- Chondestes grammacus (Say, 1822)
- Breeding Breeding (scarce) Year-round Migration Nonbreeding

= Lark sparrow =

Species of New World sparrow

The lark sparrow (Chondestes grammacus) is a fairly large New World sparrow. It is the only member of the genus Chondestes.

== Distribution and habitat ==
It breeds in southern Canada, much of the United States, and northern Mexico. It is much less common in the east, where its range is contracting. The populations in Mexico and adjacent states of the United States are resident, but other birds are migratory, wintering in the southern United States, Mexico and south to Guatemala.

It is a very rare vagrant to western Europe, with two accepted records in Great Britain in 1981 and 1991.

== Description ==
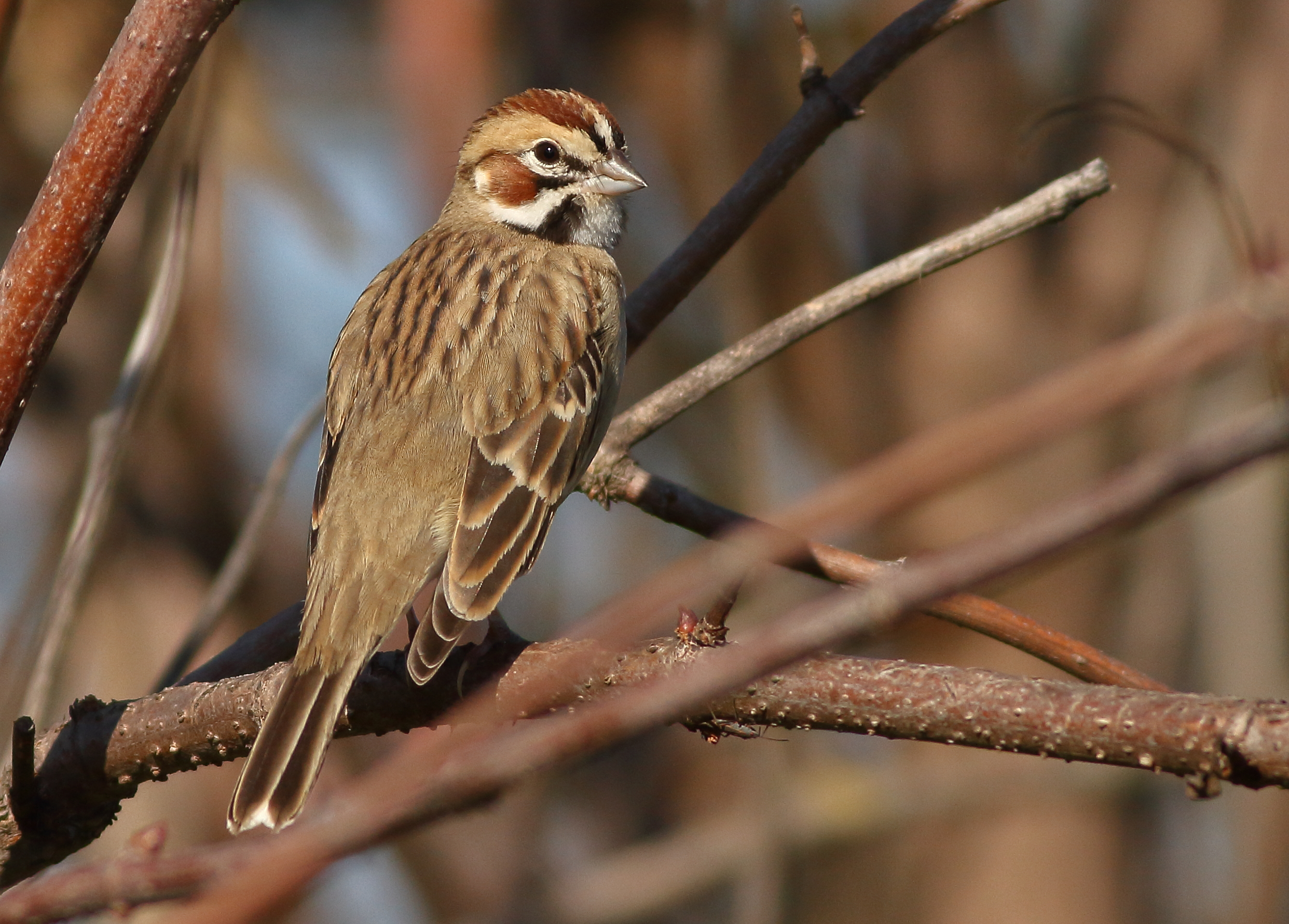
Lark Sparrow in Sacramento, California.

The lark sparrow is distinctive. Adults have a typically sparrow-like dark-streaked brown back, and white underparts except for a dark central spot. The cheeks and crown sides are chestnut, with white eyebrow and crown stripes. The dark tail's corners are also white. Young lark sparrows are duller, and the underparts are streaked.

Measurements:

- Length: 5.9–6.7 in (15–17 cm)
- Weight: 0.8–1.2 oz (24–33 g)
- Wingspan: 11.0 in (28 cm)

== Diet and behaviour ==
They forage on the ground or in low bushes. They mainly eat seeds, but insects, including grasshoppers, are also eaten in the breeding season. They form flocks on migration or in winter. When an occupied nest is approached by a predator, adult female lark sparrows are known to exhibit a distraction display.

== Breeding ==
The breeding habitat is a variety of open habitats including grasslands and cultivation. Lark sparrows nest on the ground, laying three to six eggs in a grass cup nest sheltered by a clump of grass or other vegetation. The eggs are white with black scrawling. Lark sparrows are occasional victims of brood parasitism by the brown-headed cowbird.

== Call ==
The song is two clear notes followed by a mixture of buzzes and trills. The flight call is a thin sit.
