= Coleophora paragallivora =

Scientific classification
- Kingdom: Animalia
- Phylum: Arthropoda
- Clade: Pancrustacea
- Class: Insecta
- Order: Lepidoptera
- Family: Coleophoridae
- Genus: Coleophora
- Species: C. paragallivora

Binomial name
- Coleophora paragallivora Baldizzone & Tabell, 2007

Species of moth

Coleophora paragallivora is a moth of the family Coleophoridae. It is found in the southern Ural Mountains in Russia.

Adults have been recorded from late May to the beginning of June.

== Etymology ==
The specific name is derived from the Latin para (meaning equal, like) and gallivora, referring to the close affinity with Coleophora gallivora, especially in the structure of the male genitalia.
