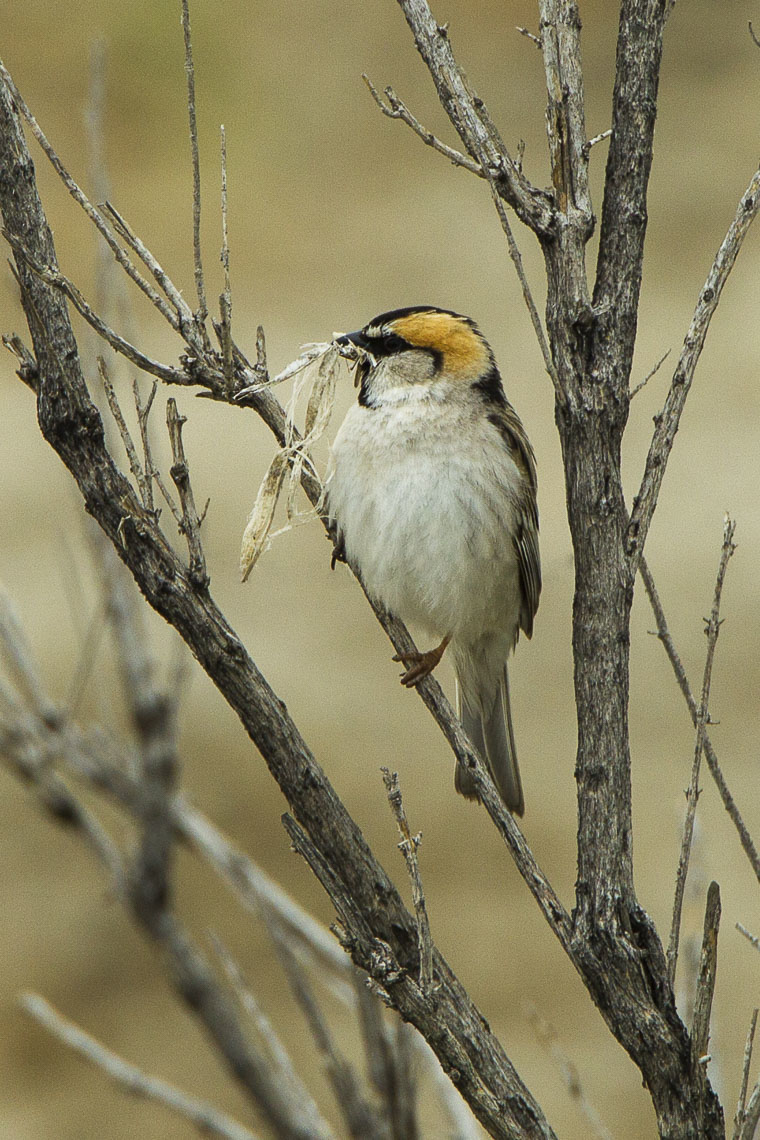
- Male in Almaty, Kazakhstan

Conservation status
- Least Concern (IUCN 3.1)

Scientific classification
- Kingdom: Animalia
- Phylum: Chordata
- Class: Aves
- Order: Passeriformes
- Family: Passeridae
- Genus: Passer
- Species: P. ammodendri

Binomial name
- Passer ammodendri Gould, 1872
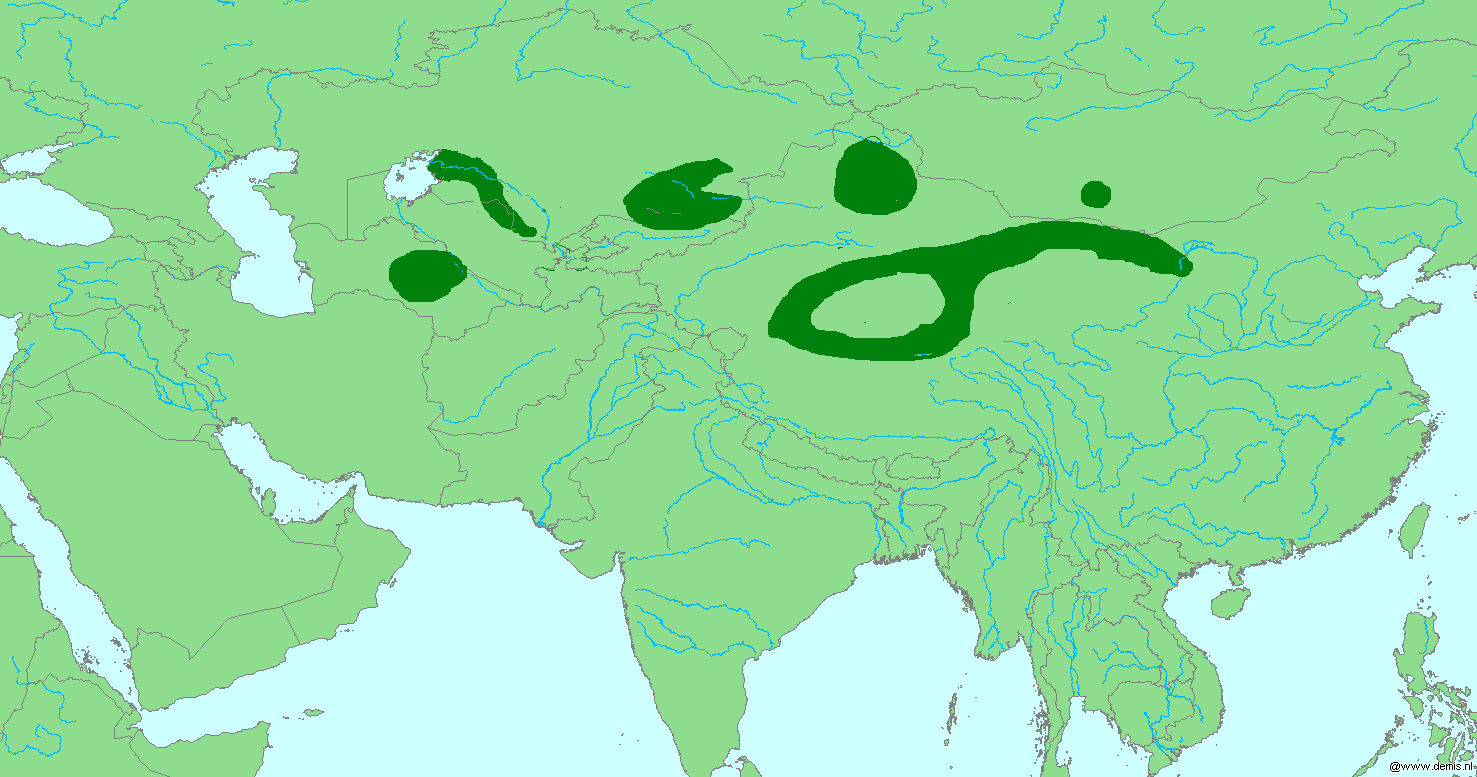
- Approximate range of the saxaul sparrow

Synonyms
- Passer ammodendri Severtzov, 1873; Passer stolickzae Hume, 1874; Passer timidus Sharpe, 1888; Ammopasser ammodendri (Severtzov, 1873) Zarudny, 1890

= Saxaul sparrow =

Species of bird

The saxaul sparrow (Passer ammodendri) is a passerine bird of the sparrow family (Passeridae), found in parts of Central Asia. At 14–16 centimetres (5.5–6.3 in) and 25–32 grams (0.88–1.13 oz), it is among the larger range of sparrows. Both sexes have plumage ranging from dull grey to sandy brown, and pale brown legs. Females have less boldly coloured plumage and bills, lacking the pattern of black stripes on the male's head. The head markings of both sexes make the saxaul sparrow distinctive and unlikely to be confused with any other bird. Vocalisations include a comparatively soft and musical chirping call, a song, and a flight call.

Three subspecies are recognised, differing in the overall tone of their plumage and in the head striping of the female. The subspecies ammodendri occurs in the west of the saxaul sparrow's range, while stoliczkae and nigricans occur in the east. This distribution falls into six probably disjunct areas across Central Asia, from central Turkmenistan to northern Gansu in China. A bird of deserts, the saxaul sparrow favours areas with shrubs such as the saxaul (Haloxylon), near rivers and oases. Though it has lost parts of its range to habitat destruction caused by agriculture, it is not seriously threatened by human activities.

Little is known of the saxaul sparrow's behaviour. Often hidden in foliage, it forages in trees and on the ground. It feeds mostly on seeds, such as from saxaul, as well as insects while breeding and as a nestling. When not breeding, it forms wandering flocks, but it is less social than other sparrows while breeding, often nesting in isolated pairs. Nests are round bundles of dry plant material lined with soft materials such as feathers. They are built in holes in tree cavities, earth banks, rocky slopes, and within man-made structures or the nests of birds of prey. Two clutches of five or six eggs are typically laid in a season. Both parents construct the nest and care for their eggs and young.

== Description ==
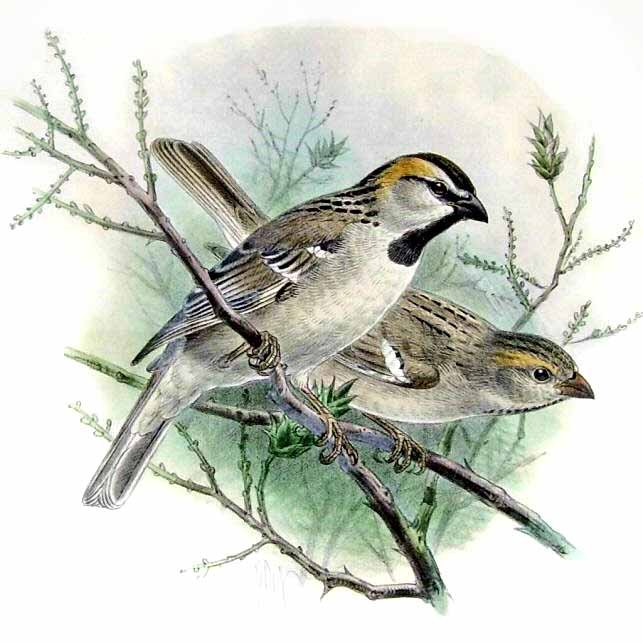
An illustration of a pair by Henry Eeles Dresser

The saxaul sparrow is one of the larger sparrows at 14–16 centimetres (5.5–6.3 in) and 25–32 grams (0.88–1.13 oz). Wing length varies from 7.1 to 8.1 centimetres (2.8 to 3.2 in), with males generally being larger. The tail is short at 6.3–6.95 centimetres (2.48–2.74 in). The saxaul sparrow's legs are pale or pinkish brown, with a tarsus length of 1.95 inches (50 mm). Its bill is 1.0–1.3 centimetres (0.39–0.51 in) long, pale grey on the juvenile, pale yellowish with a black tip on the breeding female, and black on the breeding male. Like all other sparrows, it flies swiftly and often at height.

Distinctive markings, especially on its head, make the saxaul sparrow unlikely to be confused with any other bird. It is dull-coloured, with plumage ranging between dull grey and warm sandy brown, varying between and within subspecies. Birds of the subspecies ammodendri are a sandy grey, while nigricans birds are similar but darker, and stoliczkae birds are warm brown or russet. Birds of the subspecies stoliczkae and those from the southwest of the range of ammodendri also differ from usual ammodendri birds in their lack of streaking on the rump and upper tail coverts. Birds in Mongolia have a larger and deeper bill and broad bluish streaks on their chest.

The male saxaul sparrow has bold markings, with a black stripe along the top of its head and another through its eye. It has black feathering, or a "bib", on its throat and upper belly. By comparison to other sparrows, this is thin on the throat, but wide on the breast. The male has a bright russet patch on the sides of its crown and nape. Its cheeks are pale grey or buff, and its underparts are whitish, tinged buff or grey on its sides. Its back is grey or warm brown, streaked variably with black. Its shoulders are more lightly streaked with black bars. The male's thin tail is brown, with the edges and tips of feathers paler. Its median coverts are black with a white tip, while its other wing feathers are variably dark brown, cinnamon, or black, tipped buff or whitish and edged grey. The non-breeding male differs in having slightly paler plumage.

The female is similar to the male in some ways, but paler and duller. It is sandy grey or brown, with a back pattern like that of the male, and white or whitish underparts. The head of the females of the subspecies ammodendri and nigricans is dingy grey with darker smudges on the forehead, behind its eyes, and on its throat. The female of the subspecies stoliczkae is buff-brown with a white throat, a conspicuous pale supercilium, darker forehead, and lighter cheeks. The juvenile is similar to the female, differing in its lack of dark tinges on its throat and crown. In adults, moulting begins in July and ends in late August or early September. The post-juvenile moult is complete and occurs variously from June to August.

The saxaul sparrow's vocalisations are little reported. Its common call is a chirp, transcribed as cheerp cheerp, softer and more melodious than that of the house sparrow. It gives a flight call transcribed as twerp, and a song described by Russian naturalist V. N. Shnitnikov as "not loud, but pleasantly melodious with fairly diversified intonations".

== Taxonomy ==
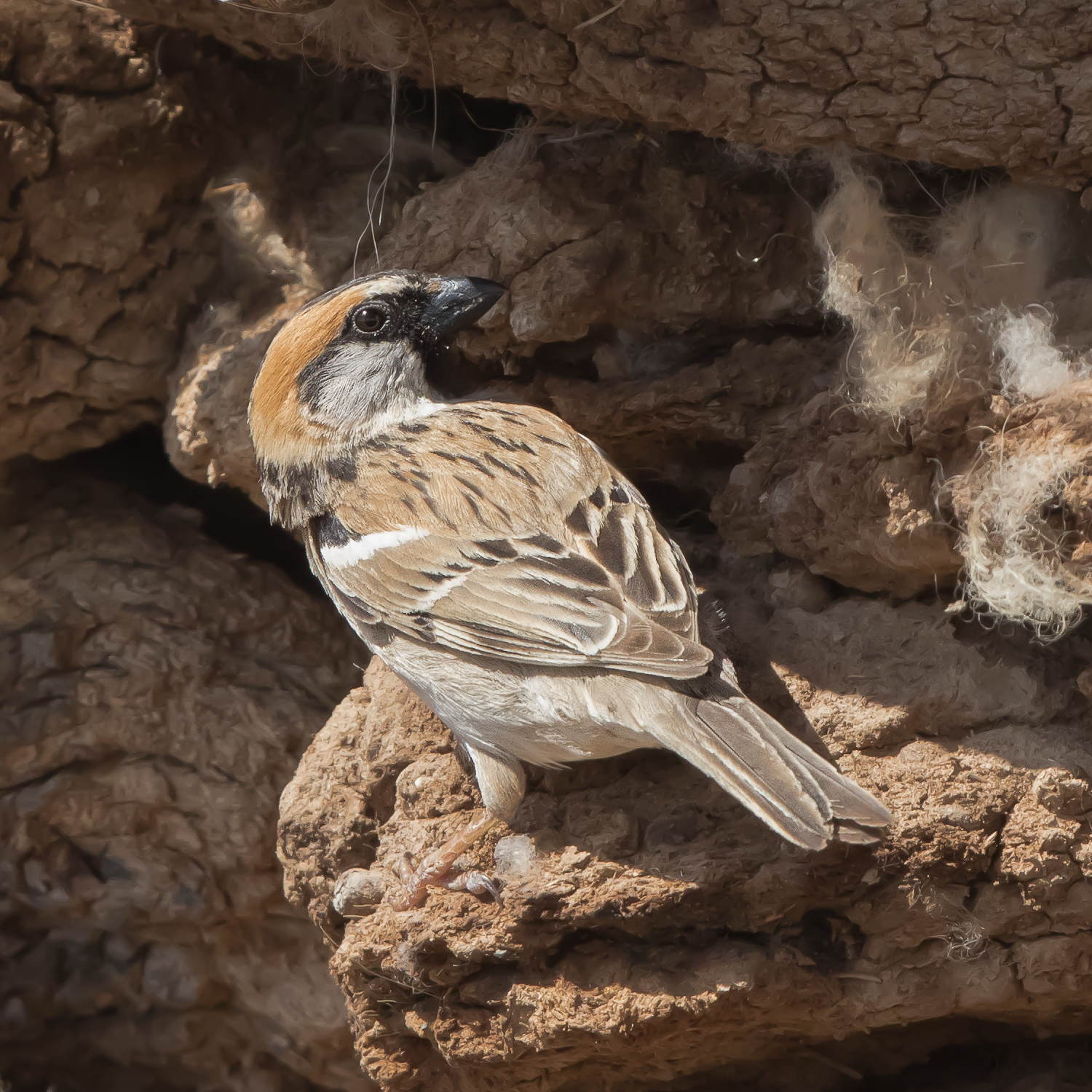
Male saxaul sparrow in Mongolia

The saxaul sparrow was first described by English zoologist John Gould in a March 1872 instalment of The Birds of Asia, from a specimen collected near Kyzylorda, now in southern Kazakhstan, by Russian naturalist Nikolai Severtzov. Severtzov had been planning to describe the species as Passer ammodendri for several years and had been distributing specimens among other naturalists. When natural history dealer Charles Dode escaped from the Paris Commune in 1871 with some of his collection, Gould obtained specimens from a set of rare birds Dode exhibited to the Zoological Society of London. Severtzov did not describe the species until 1873, and some later writers preferred to attribute it to him, but Gould's description takes priority over Severtzov's. The saxaul sparrow's species name refers to its desert habitat, coming from the name of the Ammodendron or sand acacia tree, which is in turn derived from the Ancient Greek άμμος (ammos, "sand") and δένδρον (dendron, "tree"). The English name saxaul sparrow refers to the saxaul plant, with which it is closely associated. The saxaul sparrow usually is classified in the genus Passer with the house sparrow and around twenty other species, although a genus Ammopasser was created for the saxaul sparrow by Nikolai Zarudny in 1890.

The saxaul sparrow's relationships within the genus Passer are unclear. However, because of its black throat feathering, it has usually been considered part of the "Palaearctic black-bibbed sparrow" group, related to the house sparrow. J. Denis Summers-Smith considered that the Palaearctic Passer sparrows evolved about 25,000 to 15,000 years ago, during the last glacial period. During this time, sparrows would have been isolated in ice-free refugia, such as a certain steppe region in Central Asia, where Summers-Smith suggested the saxaul sparrow evolved. Genetic and fossil evidence suggest a much earlier origin for the Passer species, perhaps in the Miocene and Pliocene, as suggested by Luis Allende and colleagues in their 2001 phylogenetic analysis of mitochondrial DNA. This analysis, based on a small sample of Passer species, suggested that the saxaul sparrow is sister to Passer griseus and that the two species together are sister to Passer melanurus. A 2021 molecular phylogenetic analysis with a larger sample of species found a clade of Afrotropical Passer species, which was sister to a clade of Palearctic and Oriental species (which includes the saxaul sparrow) that diverged from each other about 5.5 million years ago.

Diagrams of the plumage of breeding males of the subspecies ammodendri (left) and stoliczkae (right)

Across its Central Asian distribution, the saxaul sparrow occurs in six probably disjunct areas, and is divided into at least three subspecies. The nominate subspecies Passer ammodendri ammodendri inhabits three of these areas, one in the Syr Darya basin of Kazakhstan and Uzbekistan, and another to the south of Lake Balkhash and the north of Almaty, where it is only common in the valley of the Ili River. In a third area, sometimes recognised as a subspecies korejewi, ammodendri birds breed sporadically in parts of central Turkmenistan, Iran, and possibly Afghanistan, migrating to the south during the winter. The subspecies stoliczkae was named after Ferdinand Stoliczka in 1874 by Allan Octavian Hume, from specimens Stoliczka collected in Yarkand. This subspecies is separated from the other two subspecies by the Tian Shan mountains. It is found across a broad swath of China from Kashgar east to the far west of Inner Mongolia, through the areas around the Taklamakan Desert (but probably not in the inhospitable desert itself), and through the east of Xinjiang, northern Gansu, and the fringes of southern Mongolia. In the extreme west of the Gobi Desert a disjunct population separated from the other stoliczkae birds by the Gurvan Saikhan Uul mountains occurs, which is sometimes separated as a subspecies timidus. The subspecies nigricans, described by ornithologist L. S. Stepanyan in 1961, is found in northern Xinjiang's Manasi River valley.

== Habitat ==
The saxaul sparrow is found in remote parts of Central Asia, where its distribution is believed to comprise six disjunct areas, though this is uncertain due to the scarcity of records. It is found in deserts, especially around rivers and oases. It is usually found around shrubs such as saxaul (Haloxylon), poplar (Populus), or tamarisk (Tamarix). Sometimes it occurs around settlements and grain fields, especially during the winter. It is not believed to be threatened, since it is reported as locally common across a wide range, and hence it is assessed as Least Concern on the IUCN Red List. However, it seems to have lost large parts of its range to the intensification of agriculture and desertification caused by overgrazing.

== Behaviour ==
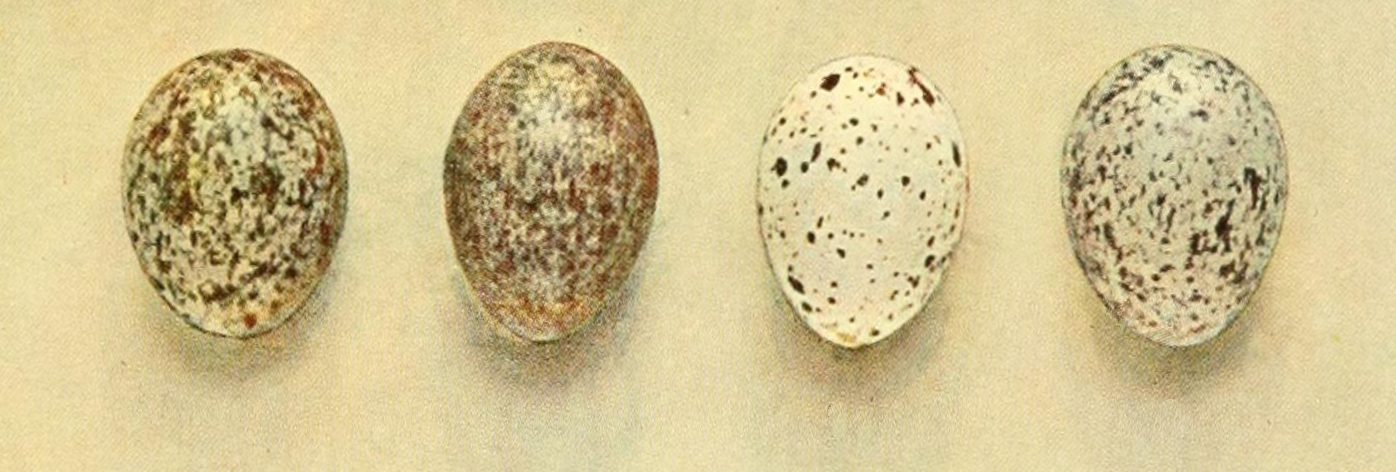
Four eggs collected by Nikolai Zarudny in Transcaspia

Little is known about the saxaul sparrow's behaviour due to its remote range. It is shy in many areas, and spends much time hidden in foliage, but breeding birds in Mongolia were reported to be "quite confiding". When not breeding, it is social, and can form flocks of up to fifty birds, sometimes associating with Eurasian tree, Spanish, and house sparrows. In some regions, it makes small local migrations. Towards the spring, saxaul sparrows form pairs within their flock, before dispersing in April. Seeds, especially those of the saxaul, are most of its diet, though it also eats insects, especially while breeding, most commonly weevils, grasshoppers, and caterpillars. It forages in trees and on the ground. In a study of insects fed to nestlings in the Ili River valley, it was found that beetles are predominant, with weevils and Coccinellidae comprising 60 and 30 percent of the diet of nestlings, respectively. Because of its desert habitat and scarcity, it is not a pest of agriculture. Where water is not available, the saxaul sparrow may fly several times each day over long distances to drink.

The saxaul sparrow is less social than other sparrows while breeding, due to its dry habitat and its choices of nesting locations, holes in trees, and earth banks. Isolated pairs are usual, though it sometimes breeds in small groups, with members of its own species as well as house and Eurasian tree sparrows. The breeding season is short, lasting from May to July, with most young raised in April and June. Unusually for a sparrow, it has not been recorded nesting openly in branches, though this may represent the lack of published records. Nests are often built in tree cavities, where they are sometimes placed close together. Other common nesting localities are earth banks and rocky slopes, and nests have been recorded on the nests of birds of prey, unused buildings, walls, and electricity pylons. Nests in man-made structures are increasingly common, as large trees in the saxaul sparrow's habitat are removed. Nests may be quite close to the ground, especially when they are built in trees.

The saxaul sparrow's nests are untidy, dome-shaped constructions with an entrance on the side or top. They are built of grasses, roots, and other plant materials, and are lined with feathers, fur, and soft plant material. The nest is mainly built by the female, though the male may actively take part in building. Typical clutches have five or six eggs, and two clutches a year are normal. Eggs are broad and ovular, slightly pointed at one end. They are glossy, coloured white and shaded with rusty grey or yellowish brown. In some clutches, one egg is noticeably paler than the others. Four eggs collected by Zarudny from Transcaspia had an average size of 1.9 cm × 1.4 cm (0.75 in × 0.55 in). Females play the main part in incubating eggs, and males can often be seen guarding the nests during incubation. Males and females share in feeding their young, which they do every 4 to 12 minutes. Young that have left their nest remain nearby until well after their moult, before departing for winter flocks, followed later by the adults.
