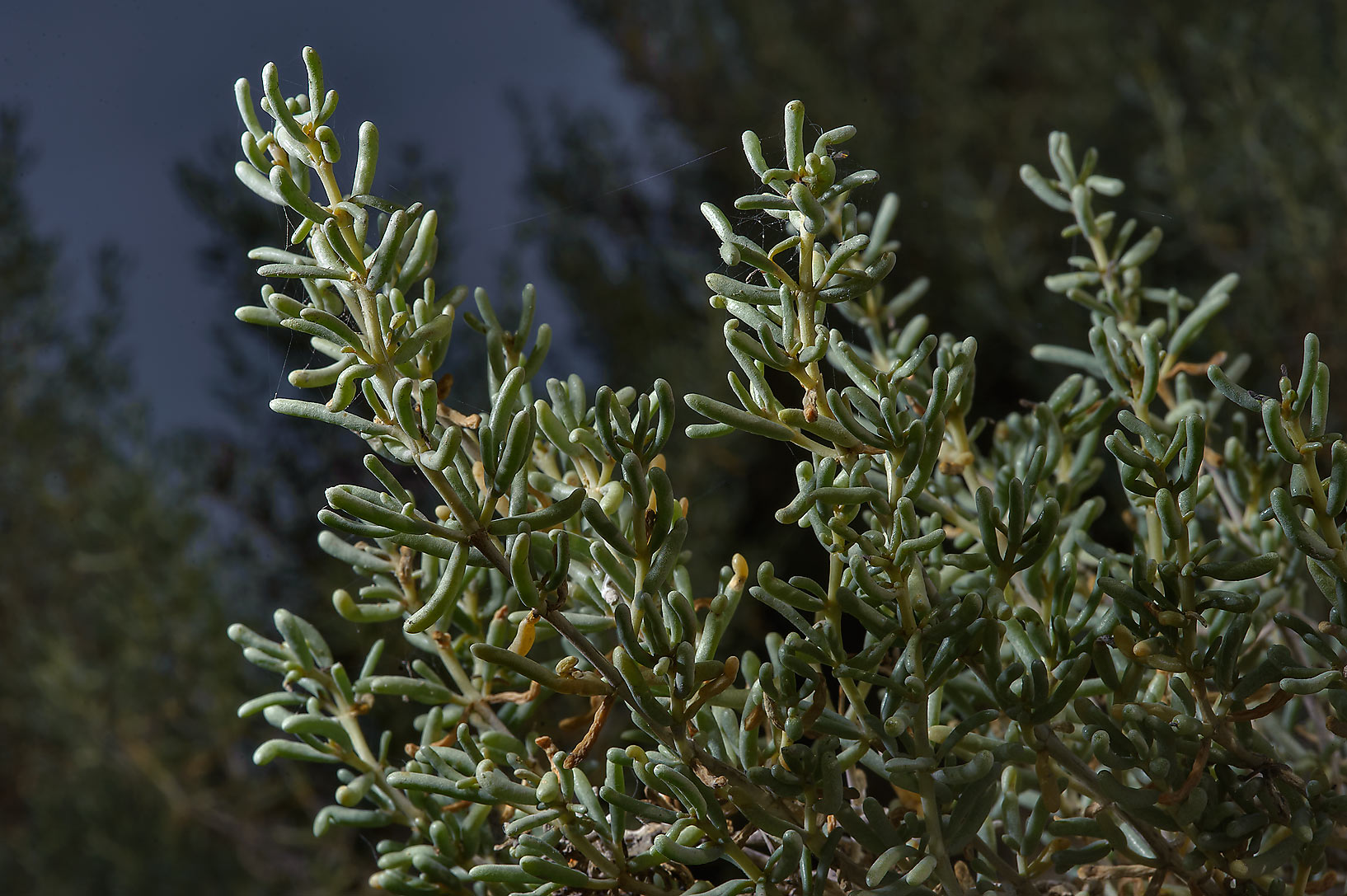
- Seidlitzia rosmarinus

Scientific classification
- Kingdom: Plantae
- Clade: Tracheophytes
- Clade: Angiosperms
- Clade: Eudicots
- Order: Caryophyllales
- Family: Amaranthaceae
- Subfamily: Salsoloideae
- Genus: Seidlitzia; Bunge ex Boiss.

= Seidlitzia =

Genus of plants in the amaranth family

Seidlitzia was genus of flowering plants belonging to the family Amaranthaceae, now considered a synonym of genus Soda. It is also in the Salsoloideae subfamily.

Its native range is from Egypt, Central Asia (within Afghanistan, Iran, Iraq, Lebanon, Israel, Syria, Tajikistan, Transcaucasus, Turkey, Turkmenistan and Uzbekistan,) to Western Himalayas and Pakistan, India and the Arabian Peninsula (within the Gulf States, Kuwait, Oman, Saudi Arabia and Socotra).

The genus name of Seidlitzia is in honour of Nikolai Karl Samuel von Seidlitz (1831–1907), a Baltic German botanist and statistician. It was first described and published in Fl. Orient. Vol.4 on page 950 in 1879.

== Species ==
Accepted species by Kew included:

- Seidlitzia florida (M.Bieb.) Boiss.
- Seidlitzia rosmarinus Bunge ex Boiss.
- Seidlitzia stocksii (Boiss.) Assadi
