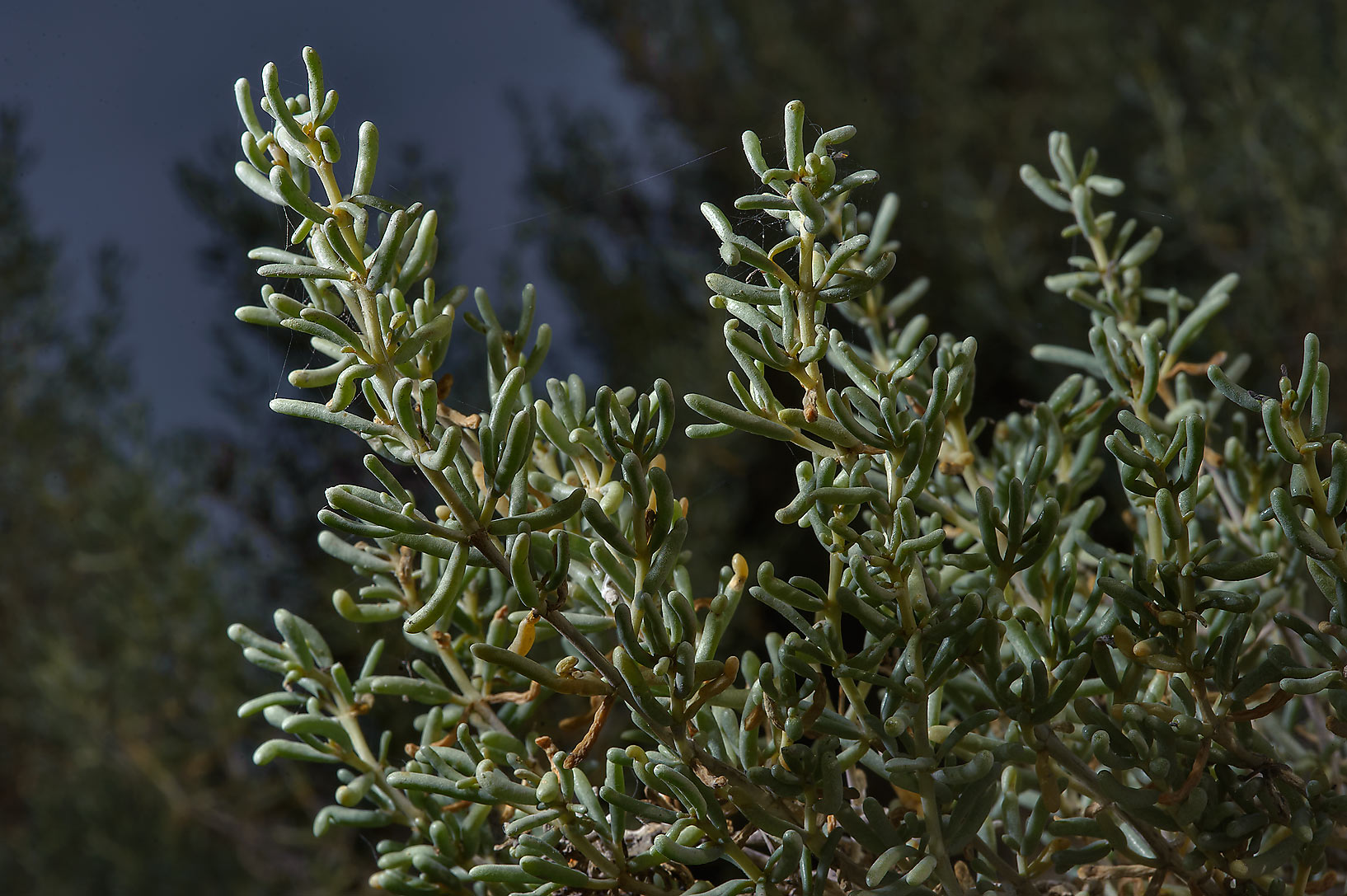

Scientific classification
- Kingdom: Plantae
- Clade: Tracheophytes
- Clade: Angiosperms
- Clade: Eudicots
- Order: Caryophyllales
- Family: Amaranthaceae
- Genus: Soda
- Species: S. rosmarinus

Binomial name
- Soda rosmarinus (Bunge ex Boiss.) Akhani

Synonyms
- Seidlitzia rosmarinus Bunge ex Boiss.; Salsola rosmarinus (Ehrenb. ex Boiss.) Solms; Salsola schweinfurthii Solms; Suaeda rosmarinus Ehrenb. ex Boiss.

= Soda rosmarinus =

Species of plant

Soda rosmarinus is a perennial-green desert species of saltwort in the Amaranthaceae family. It is endemic to the lower Jordan Valley along the Dead Sea, in Israel and Jordan, and in the Syrian desert, Central Iraq (near Najaf) and in the coastal regions of Saudi Arabia, the islands of Bahrain, Qatar, and Iran, commonly known in Arabic by the names ʾušnān (Arabic: أشنان) and šenān and in the Neo-Aramaic languages by reflexes of ʾuḥlā. It is often used by Bedouins for cleaning as a soap substitute. In medieval Arabic literature, it is also known by the names of "green ushnan" and "launderers' potash", having been used since time immemorial to produce nabulsi soap and as an electuary in compounding theriac for use in treating scorpion stings, as well as for extracting potassium for other medicinal uses.

== Habitat ==
The plant grows mainly in salt flats (Arabic: sabkha) in hard soil surfaces, and can also be found growing along riverine gulches (Arabic: wadi) and in drainage runnels that have alkaline and saline soils, subsequently accumulating in its leaves a high quantity of sodium and chloride (chlorine ions). It thrives in silty soil which is very slippery and muddy when wet, but becomes baked hard with a flaking surface which breaks up into a fine dust when dry, and can especially be seen growing on hummocks in such terrain.

== Description ==
S. rosmarinus, like its relative S. longifolia, has opposite fleshy leaves and winged outgrowths arising above the middle of the notch-like perianth parts. However, unlike its relative, this species has leaf bases almost completely joined at the nodes without any longitudinal channel running down the internode. It also contains a dense tuft of white hairs in the axil of each leaf. The perianth parts and wings of the genus Soda are unequally developed in each flower. The wings of the plant overlap, while the upper part of the perianth is broad at its base. The plant is classified as a xerophyte, having adapted itself to places with little water. It blossoms in late March, April, and early May.

== Uses in ancient medicine ==
The species has been used in antiquity for the production of potash, hence its Arabic name, ušnān. The 10th-century Arab physician, al-Tamimi, described the plant in his day as being imported into Palestine, Egypt, and other regions from the riverine gulches around the vicinity of Amman, in Transjordan, and used in the production of an alkali soap (Arabic: غاسول = ġāsūl) and of cleaning agents. According to al-Tamimi, the plants were gathered in their fresh, green state in large bundles, transferred to furnaces made with plastered floors and stone spouts, where they were cast inside, beneath which were laid large timbers that were set aflame, causing the melting alkali substance to drip down by the spouts into a threshing floor directly below. The liquid would be collected and eventually become hardened when it cooled, the finished product resembling a hard, black-colored stone. The stone-like mineral could be broken up into smaller fragments and used as a laundry detergent.

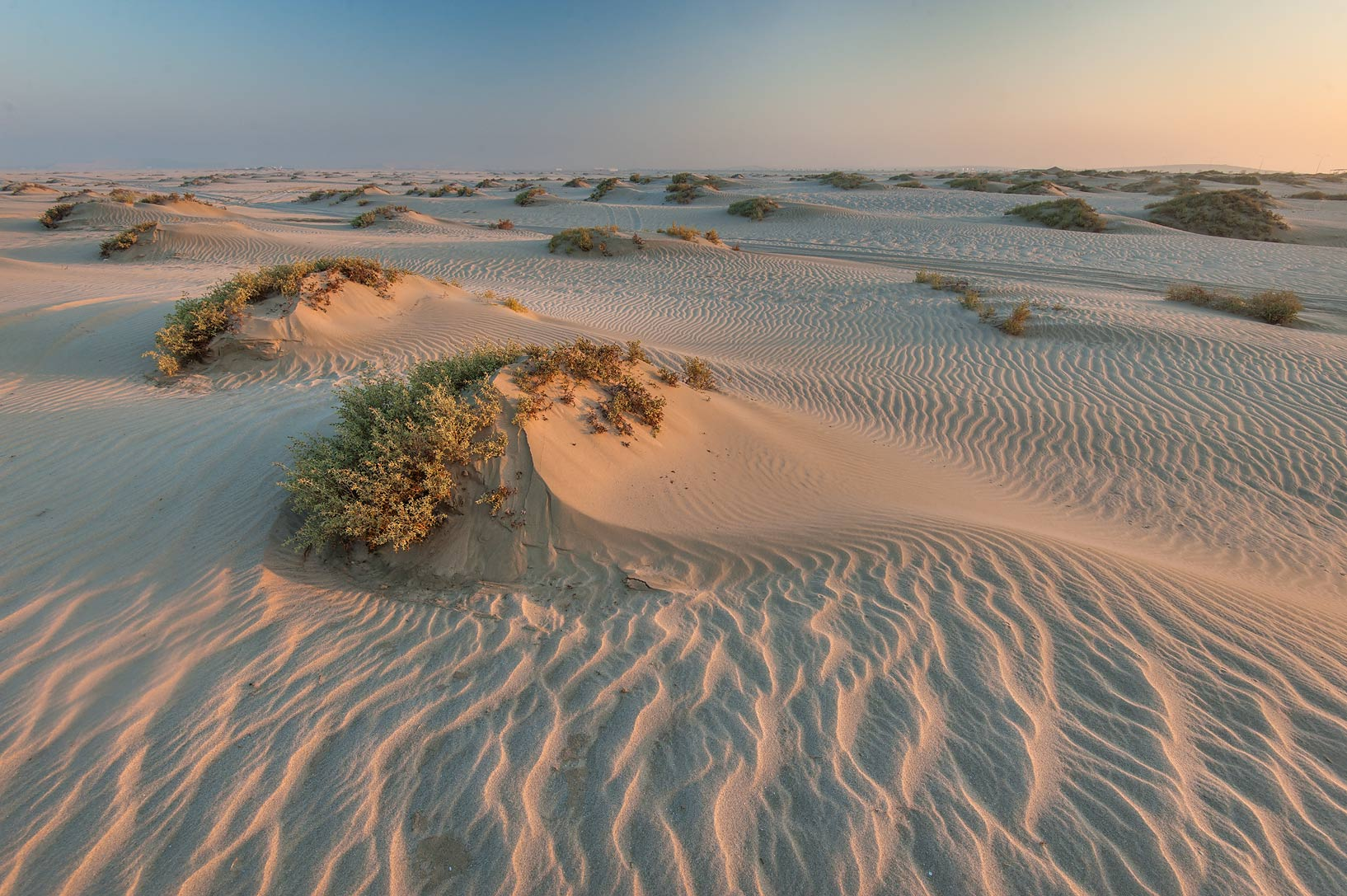
S. rosmarinus growing on small sand mounds in Qatar

Some of the salt bushes produced a type of potassium alum (Arabic: shab) that was brownish in color, having a strong alkalinity and burning effect when tasted. Al-Tamimi adds that one of the chemical elements had by burning Seidlitzia's succulent green leaves is al-qalī, which, besides being a natural cleansing agent, its "plant ashes" (potash) could be converted into potassium by placing the ashes into a pot, adding water thereto, and heating it until one is left with an evaporated solution. When this solution was mixed with coarsely ground yellow-orpiment (As_{2}S_{3}) and with oil extracted from unripe olives, heated in a ceramic skillet placed over a fire, and turned constantly with an iron spoon until it congeals (having the fire actually touch it until it turns reddish in color), it too, according to al-Tamimi, is said to have certain medicinal properties, said to prevent tooth decay, as well as in assuaging blood loss from the gums.

It is also said to be useful in removing halitosis. When the substance congeals, stirring ceases, and the substance is then allowed to burn completely while remaining in the ceramic skillet. It is then taken up while still hot and is pounded by mortar and pestle, until one is left with a fine powder. It is then sifted in a sieve and stored until ready for use. A quantity of one dirham-weight (about 3.31 g during Ottoman times) was traditionally applied with one's finger to the affected part of the gums in the mouth, and allowed to remain there for one hour. Its application, however, is said to have been quite unpleasant because of its severe burning effect and strong alkalinity. After which, the mouth was rinsed with cold water, followed by gargling with Persian rose oil to aid in the mouth's cooling.

== References to plant in Jewish literature ==
In ancient Jewish literature (Bible, Mishnah, Tosefta and Talmud) there are two generic terms used to describe alkaline plants used as a lixivium in washing hands and in laundering clothes, the one being called borith (Hebrew: בורית), the other, ahal (Hebrew: אהל). Modern scholars disagree as to the precise identity of these plants, but nearly all concur that they were alkaline substances found in certain local plants, and which could have included the genera of Salsola, Soda (Seidlitzia), Anabasis, Suaeda, Hammada, Mesembryanthemum and Salicornia, among others.
