= Hammada ramosissima =

Scientific classification
- Kingdom: Plantae
- Clade: Tracheophytes
- Clade: Angiosperms
- Clade: Eudicots
- Order: Caryophyllales
- Family: Amaranthaceae
- Genus: Hammada
- Species: H. ramosissima

Binomial name
- Hammada ramosissima (Boiss. ex Eig) Iljin

Species of plant

Hammada ramosissima is a species of flowering plant in the family Amaranthaceae. It is native to Iraq, Lebanon, Syria, Israel, Palestine, and eastern Turkey.

== Synonyms ==
- Anabasis ramosissima Dingler ex Oppenh. in Bull. Soc. Bot. Genève, sér. 2, 22: 291 (1930 publ. 1931), nom. illeg.
- Haloxylon articulatum subsp. ramosissimum Boiss. ex Eig in Palestine J. Bot., Jerusalem Ser. 3: 128 (1945)
- Hammada syriaca Botsch. in Novosti Sist. Vyssh. Rast. 1: 364 (1964), nom. superfl.
- Haloxylon eigii (Iljin) Danin & D.Heller in Fl. Medit. 10: 152 (2000)
- Hammada eigii Iljin in Novosti Sist. Vyssh. Rast. 1: 72 (1964)
