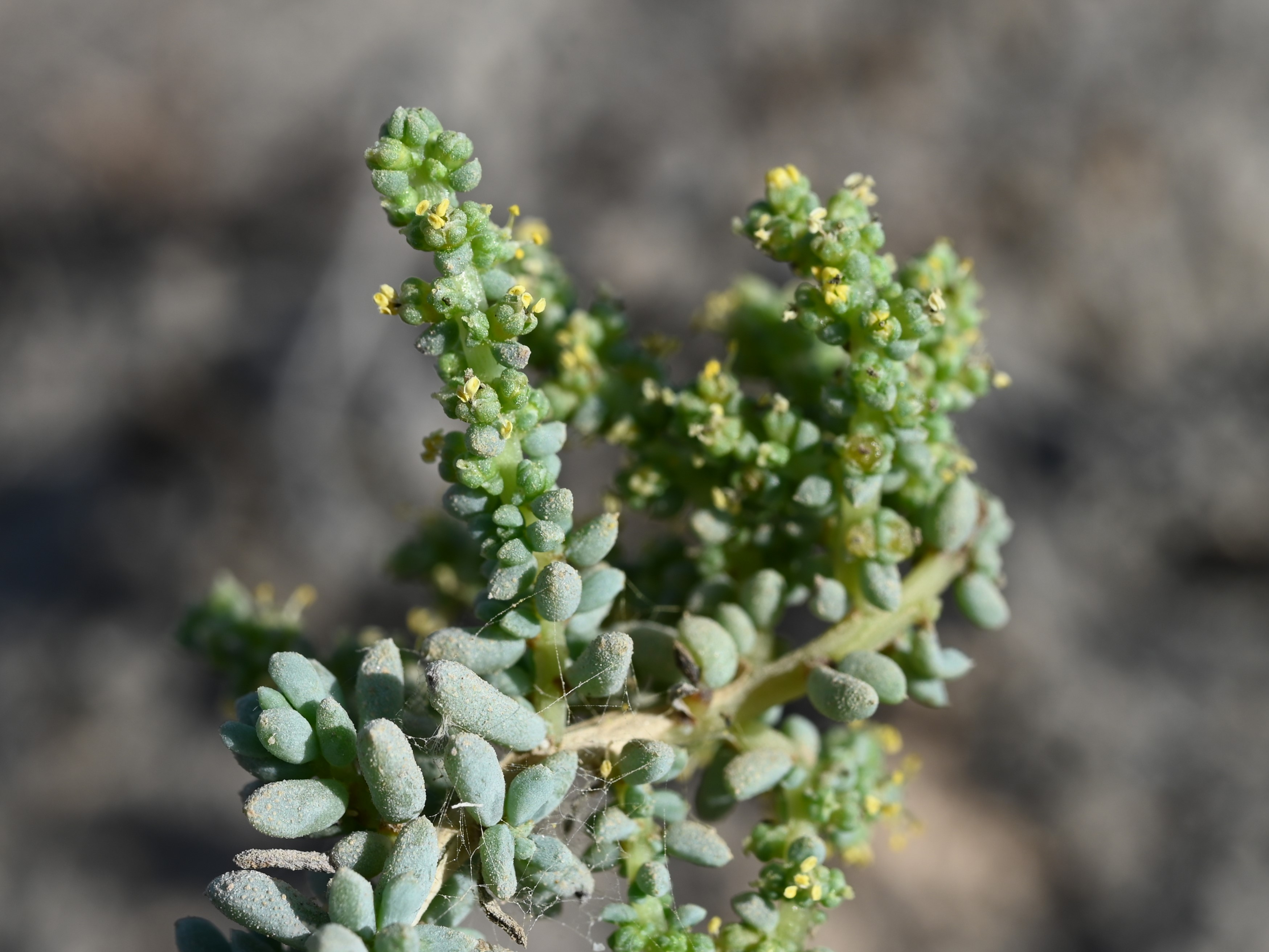
- Soda schimperi in Salalah Khawr Al Qurm Al Kabir, Dhofar, Oman

Scientific classification
- Kingdom: Plantae
- Clade: Tracheophytes
- Clade: Angiosperms
- Clade: Eudicots
- Order: Caryophyllales
- Family: Amaranthaceae
- Subfamily: Salsoloideae
- Genus: Soda
- Species: S. schimperi

Binomial name
- Soda schimperi (Moq.) Akhani (2024)

Synonyms
- Sevada schimperi Moq. (1849); Suaeda schimperi (Moq.) Ulbr. (1934); Suaeda vermiculata var. puberula C.B.Clarke (1909)

= Soda schimperi =

Species of flowering plant

Soda schimperi is a species of flowering plant belonging to the family Amaranthaceae. It is a subshrub with a native range from Egypt to northeastern Tropical Africa and the Arabian Peninsula, where it grows in deserts and dry shrublands.

The plant was first described as Sevada schimperi by Alfred Moquin-Tandon in 1849, as the sole species in genus Sevada. In 2024 Hossein Akhani placed the species in genus Soda as Soda schimperi.
