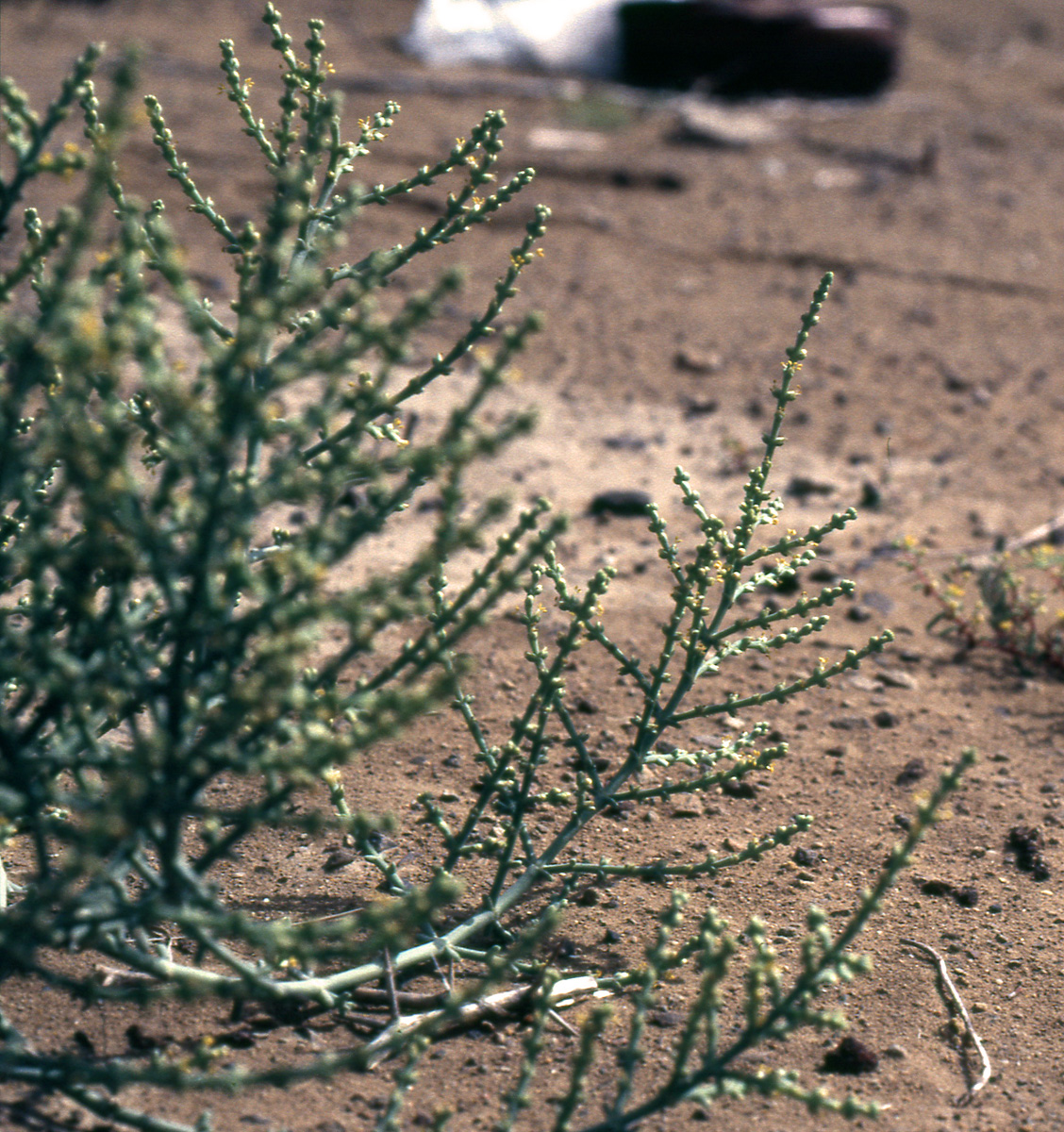

Scientific classification
- Kingdom: Plantae
- Clade: Tracheophytes
- Clade: Angiosperms
- Clade: Eudicots
- Order: Caryophyllales
- Family: Amaranthaceae
- Genus: Soda
- Species: S. stocksii

Binomial name
- Soda stocksii (Boiss.) Akhani

Synonyms
- Salsola stocksii Boiss.; Seidlitzia stocksii (Boiss.) Assadi; Haloxylon stocksii (Boiss.) Hook.f. in Benth. & Hook.f.; Haloxylon recurvum sensu (Moq.) Bunge. ex Boiss.

= Soda stocksii =

Species of shrub

Soda stocksii is a shrub species of the family Amaranthaceae (formerly classified under the Chenopodiaceae).

It is locally known as khar, meaning salty.

== Taxonomy ==
It was first described as a new species by Pierre Edmond Boissier in the 1859 Diagnoses plantarum orientalium novarum. Phylogenetic analysis in 2007 revealed that the species did not belong to genus Haloxylon and had to be classified in the genus Salsola, however, the correct name is given as Seidlitzia stocksii in Plants of the World Online. It was recombined with, i.e. moved to, the genus Seidlitzia by Mostafa Assadi in 2001 and then to genus Soda in 2020.

Soda stocksii belongs to the subfamily Salsoloideae of the family Amaranthaceae.

== Description ==
Soda stocksii is a sturdy, glabrous or pruinose shrub 25–80 cm tall, its branches are prostrate or ascending. The distinct, sessile, spreading leaves are terete, fleshy, to 5 mm long and 1,5 mm in diameter. The opposite branches spread nearly horizontally. The inflorescences are wide panicles with 3–12 cm long spike-like branches with numerous flowers. Perianth segments are only 1,5 mm long. The 5 stamens are alternating with ovate staminodes. Fruiting, the perianth segments develop spreading brown wings, circa 6 mm in diameter. The seed diameter is 2,5–3 mm.

== Pollination and dissemination ==
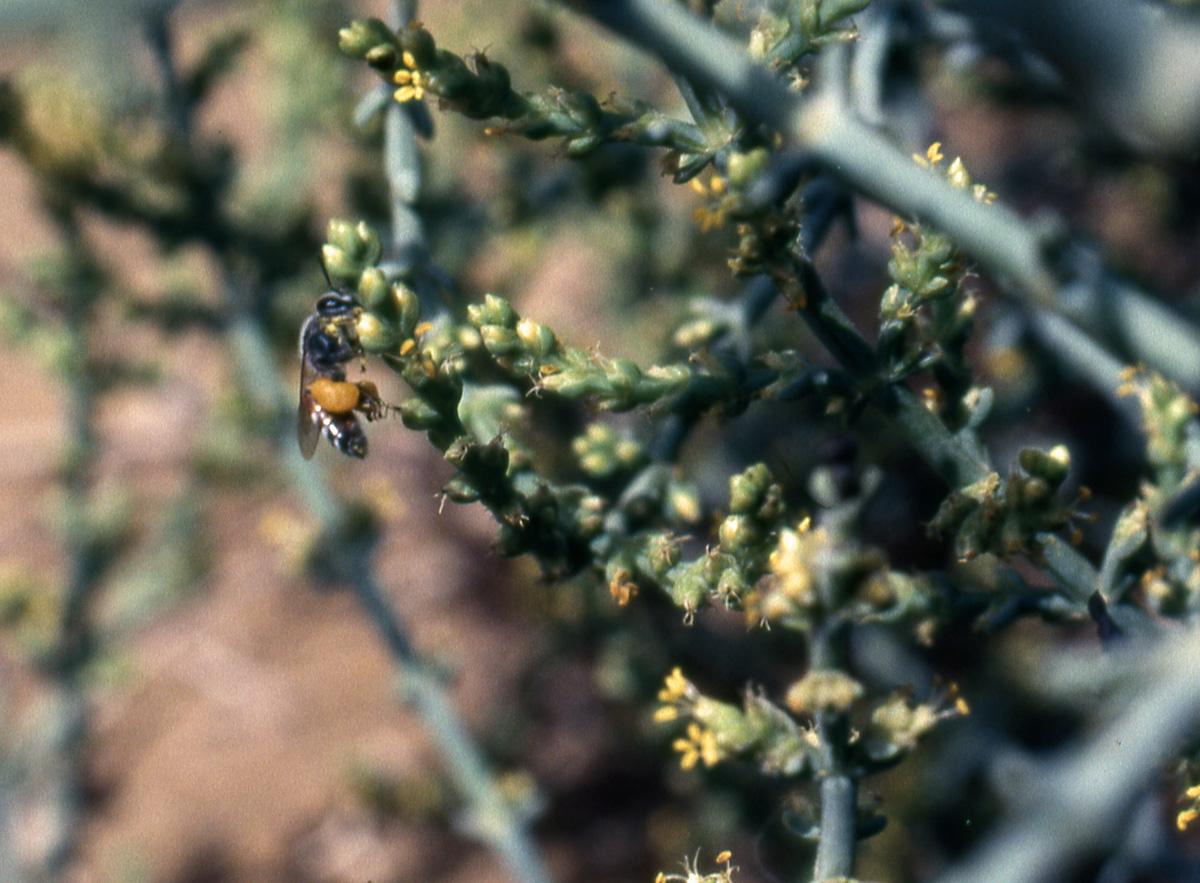
Salsola stocksii, insect pollination

Seidlitzia stocksii is pollinated by small wild bees (Hymenoptera), that were observed to collect pollen (see photo). The winged fruits are dispersed by the wind (anemochory).

== Distribution ==
Seidlitzia stocksii is distributed in Afghanistan, Pakistan and West India (Punjab, Rajasthan), where it grows on sandy or loamy saline soils (halophyte) and limestone hills.

== Uses ==
Seidlitzia stocksii is used as a source of crude sodium carbonate (barilla or sajji-khar). The sajji-khar is added as an ingredient for unique taste of papad, a crispy flatbread. The ash of this plant is used as substitute of soap for cleaning clothes and is also taken with water for treatment of internal ulcers.
