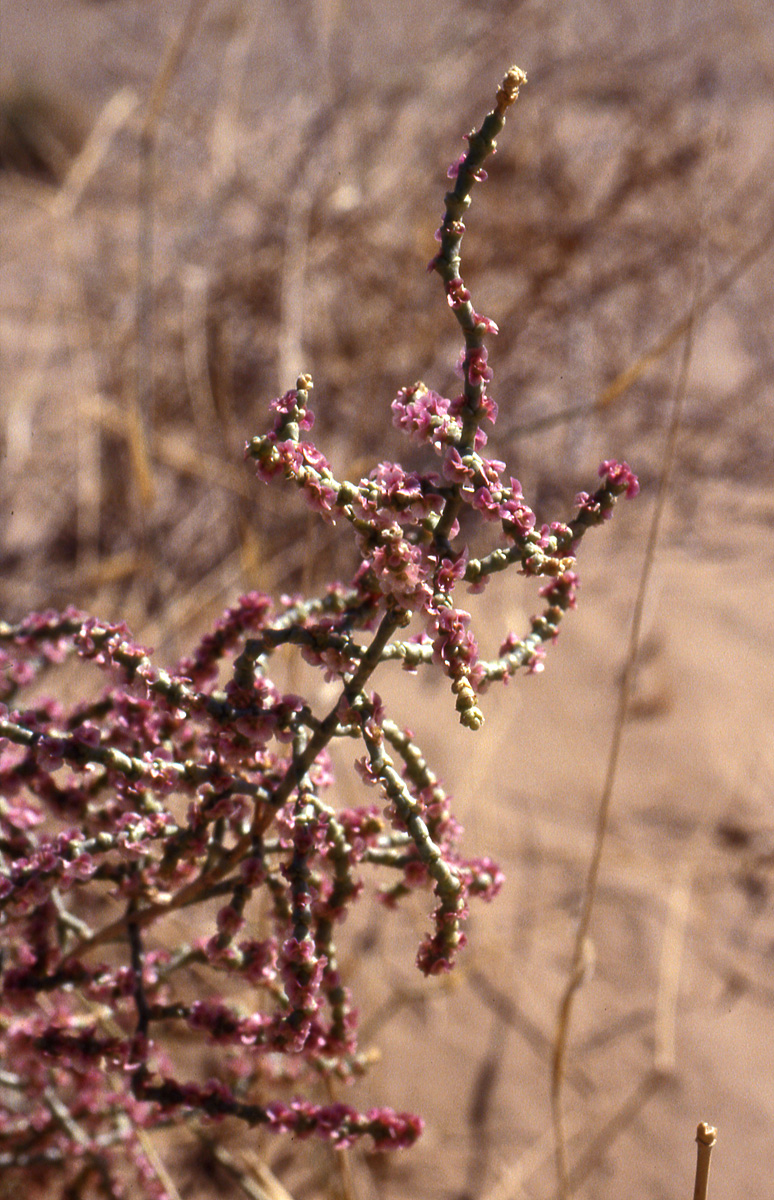
- Hammada griffithii

Scientific classification
- Kingdom: Plantae
- Clade: Tracheophytes
- Clade: Angiosperms
- Clade: Eudicots
- Order: Caryophyllales
- Family: Amaranthaceae
- Subfamily: Salsoloideae
- Genus: Hammada; Iljin

= Hammada (plant) =

Genus of flowering plants

Hammada is a genus of flowering plants belonging to the family Amaranthaceae, in which it is placed in the subfamily Salsoloideae. It is a very unclear and unsorted genus, with many species that have been classed as synonyms by other authors.

The native range of the genus is in central and southwestern Asia, with species found in Iraq, Lebanon, Palestine, Syria, Turkey and Uzbekistan. They are often found growing in alkaline or saline habitats.

== Description ==
They are perennial plants, with a glabrous (smooth) wood (only at the base). They can grow up to 40–60 cm (16–24 in) tall. The weed-like plants have regular, minute, or small, cyclic flowers. The flowers have no petals, but 5 sepals which are united at the base. It has 5 stamens and the ovary is positioned superior and consists of 2 united carpels. Which late matures into a fruit (or seed capsule).

== Known species ==
According to Plants of the World Online;

- Hammada eriantha Botsch. (from Uzbekistan)
- Hammada ramosissima (Boiss. ex Eig) Iljin (from Iraq, Lebanon, Palestine, Syria and Turkey)

However Schüssler, in 2017, listed the following species; Hammada eriantha Botsch., Hammada griffithii (Moq.) Iljin, Hammada negevensis Iljin & Zoh., Hammada salicornica (Moq.) Iljin, Hammada schmittiana (Pomel) Botsch. and Hammada thomsonii (Bunge) Iljin.

It is not known what the genus name of Hammada is in reference to, but Hamada in Arabic is a desert landscape.

It was first described and published in Bot. Zhurn. (Moscow & Leningrad) Vol.33 on page 582 in 1948.

The genus is not accepted by the United States Department of Agriculture and the Agricultural Research Service; they list it as a synonym of Haloxylon Bunge.

Note: Hammada scoparia (Pomel) Iljin, a former species in the genus, is classed as an accepted synonym of Haloxylon scoparium Pomel.
