= Coleophora gallivora =

Scientific classification
- Kingdom: Animalia
- Phylum: Arthropoda
- Class: Insecta
- Order: Lepidoptera
- Family: Coleophoridae
- Genus: Coleophora
- Species: C. gallivora

Binomial name
- Coleophora gallivora Falkovitsh, 1970

Species of moth

Coleophora gallivora is a moth of the family Coleophoridae. It is found in Turkestan and Uzbekistan.

The larvae feed on galls made by other insects (flies of the family Cecidomyiidae). They can be found on Arbuscula arbuscula, Arbuscula richteri, and Haloxylon species. Larvae can be found from May to the beginning of June and again from the end of September to the beginning of October in at least two generations. Fully fed larvae hibernate.
