= Soda zygophylloides =

Scientific classification
- Kingdom: Plantae
- Clade: Embryophytes
- Clade: Tracheophytes
- Clade: Angiosperms
- Clade: Eudicots
- Order: Caryophyllales
- Family: Amaranthaceae
- Subfamily: Salsoloideae
- Genus: Soda
- Species: S. zygophylloides

Binomial name
- Soda zygophylloides (Aellen & C.C.Towns.) Akhani (2024)

Synonyms
- Fadenia zygophylloides Aellen & C.C.Towns. (1972); Salsola zygophylloides (Aellen & C.C.Towns.) Akhani (2007)

Species of flowering plant

Soda zygophylloides is a species of flowering plant in the amaranth family, Amaranthaceae. It is a subshrub native to Ethiopia, Kenya, and Somalia.

The species was first described as Fadenia zygophylloides by Paul Aellen and Clifford Charles Townsend in 1972, who placed it in the monotypic genus Fadenia. In 2024 Hossein Akhani placed the species in the genus Soda as Soda zygophylloides.
