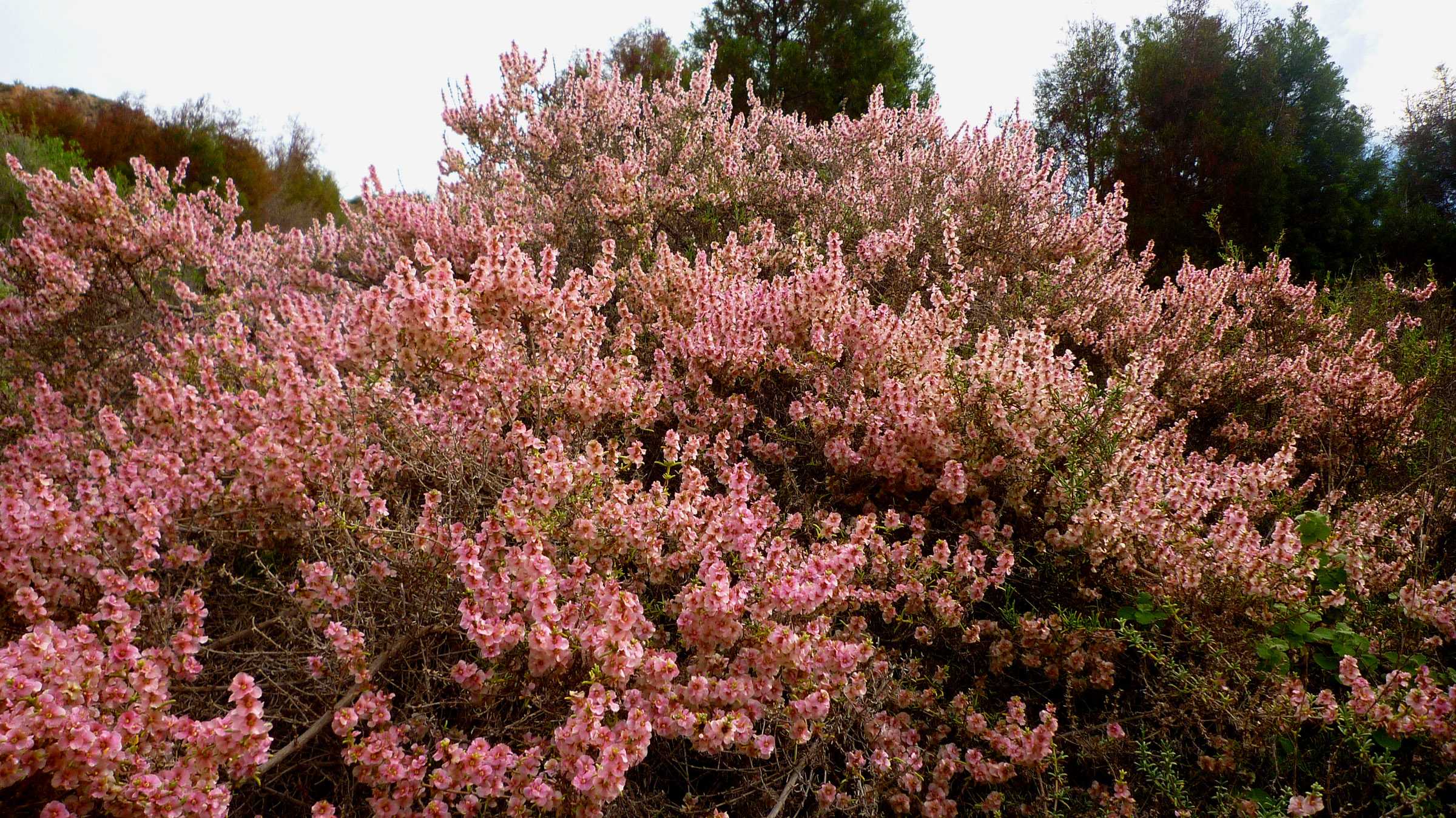

Scientific classification
- Kingdom: Plantae
- Clade: Tracheophytes
- Clade: Angiosperms
- Clade: Eudicots
- Order: Caryophyllales
- Family: Amaranthaceae
- Genus: Soda
- Species: S. oppositifolia

Binomial name
- Soda oppositifolia (Desf.) Akhani

Synonyms
- Salsola oppositifolia Desf.; Seidlitzia oppositifolia (Desf.) Iljin

= Soda oppositifolia =

Species of plant

Soda oppositifolia is a species of halophyte shrub native to the Mediterranean Basin.

== Description ==
This annual, woody plant can grow into shrubs up to 2 m tall. It has cylindrical-linear and opposed leaves. The flowers, which bloom from May to October, are hermaphrodite and have a size of 1 cm.

== Taxonomy ==
Salsola oppositifolia was first described by René Louiche Desfontaines and published in Flora Atlantica 1: 219. 1798.

== Uses ==
This plant has been historically used, along with other Soda species, as a source of soda ash, in the manufacture of lye and soaps.
