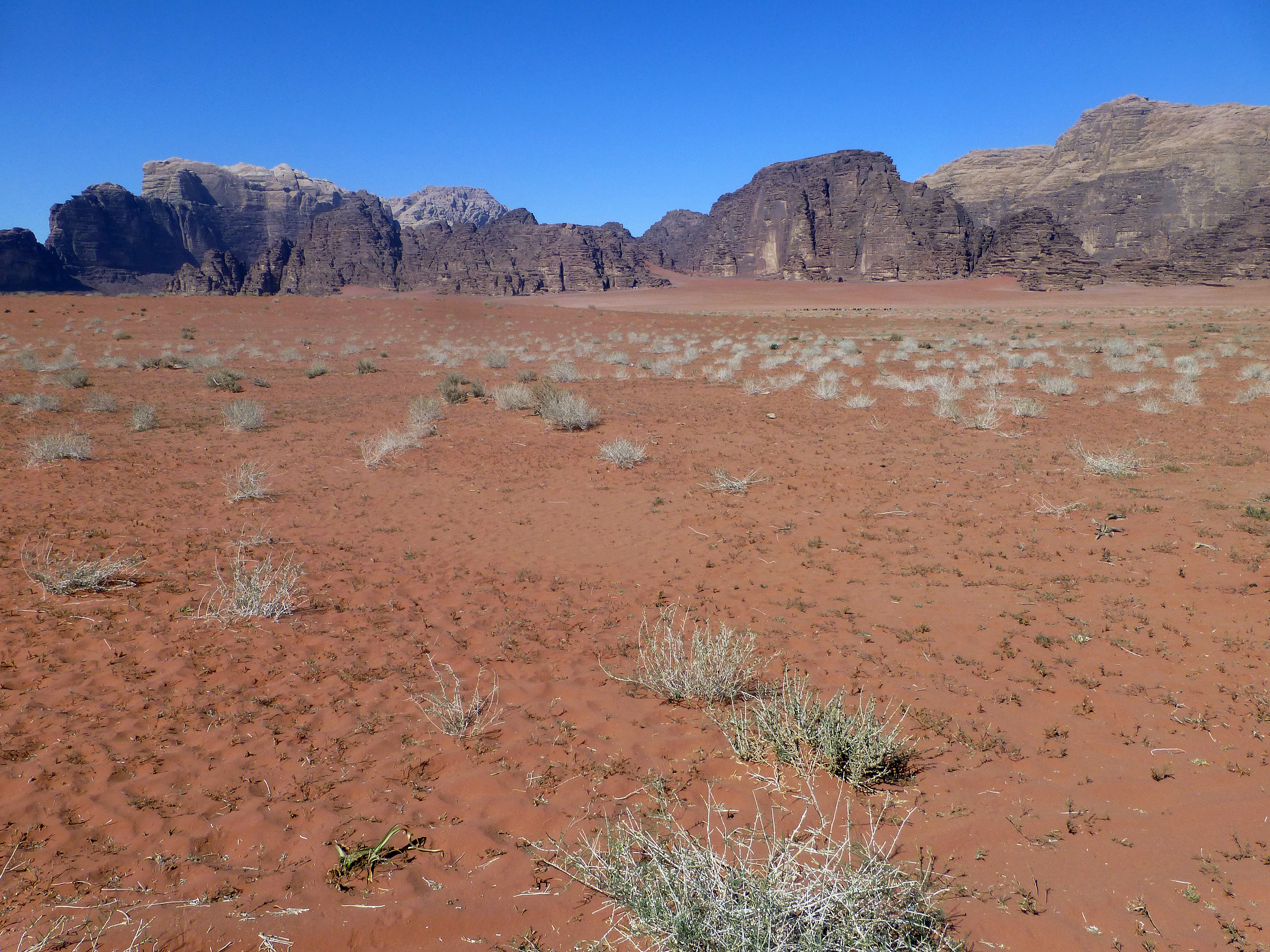
- In Jordan

Scientific classification
- Kingdom: Plantae
- Clade: Tracheophytes
- Clade: Angiosperms
- Clade: Eudicots
- Order: Caryophyllales
- Family: Amaranthaceae
- Genus: Haloxylon
- Species: H. scoparium

Binomial name
- Haloxylon scoparium Pomel

Synonyms
- Arthrophytum scoparium (Pomel) Iljin; Arthrophytum scoparium (Pomel) Iljin ex Maire & Weiller; Hammada articulata subsp. scoparia (Pomel) O.Bolòs & Vigo; Hammada scoparia (Pomel) Iljin

= Haloxylon scoparium =

Species of plant in the amaranth family

Haloxylon scoparium (syns. Arthrophytum scoparium and Hammada scoparia) is a species of flowering plant in the family Amaranthaceae, native to semiarid north Africa and the Middle East. In flat areas it is often one of the dominant species.
