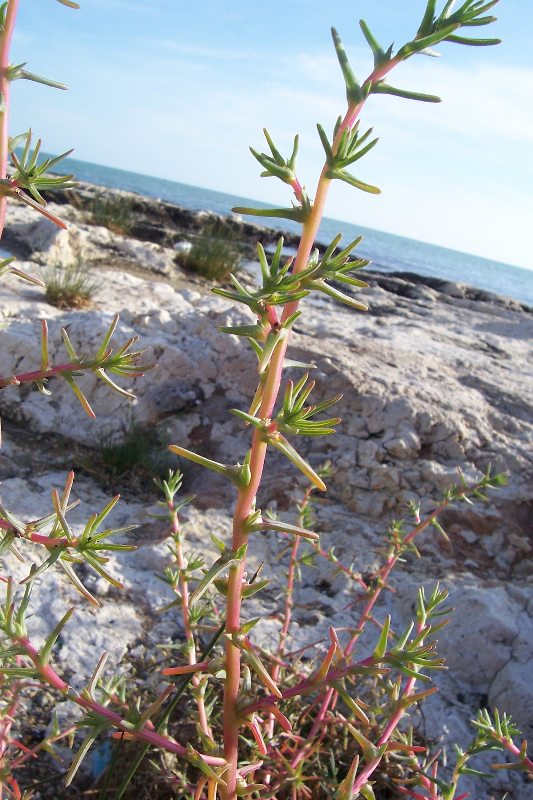
- Soda inermis

Scientific classification
- Kingdom: Plantae
- Clade: Tracheophytes
- Clade: Angiosperms
- Clade: Eudicots
- Order: Caryophyllales
- Family: Amaranthaceae
- Subfamily: Salsoloideae
- Genus: Soda (Dumort.) Fourr.

Synonyms
- Choriptera Botsch.; Fadenia Aellen & C.C.Towns.; Gyroptera Botsch.; Lagenantha Chiov.; Seidlitzia Bunge ex Boiss.; Sevada Moq.

= Soda (plant) =

Genus of plant

Soda is a genus of plants in the family Amaranthaceae. Its native range extends from southern and eastern Europe through northern and northeastern Africa and Socotra to India and Mongolia.

== Species ==
Plants of the World Online accepts 22 species:

1. Soda acutifolia (Bunge) Mosyakin, Freitag & Rilke
2. Soda austroiranica (Akhani) Akhani
3. Soda cruciata (L.Chevall. ex Batt. & Trab.) Akhani
4. Soda cycloptera (Stapf) Akhani
5. Soda cyrenaica (Maire & Weiller) Akhani
6. Soda florida (M.Bieb.) Akhani
7. Soda foliosa (L.) Akhani
8. Soda gillettii (Botsch.) Akhani
9. Soda glomerata (Maire) Akhani
10. Soda grandis (Freitag, Vural & Adıgüzel) Akhani
11. Soda inermis Fourr. - type species
12. Soda kerneri (Woł.) Akhani
13. Soda longifolia (Forssk.) Akhani
14. Soda makranica (Freitag) Akhani
15. Soda oppositifolia (Desf.) Akhani
16. Soda rosmarinus (Bunge ex Boiss.) Akhani
17. Soda schimperi (Moq.) Akhani
18. Soda schweinfurthii (Solms) Akhani
19. Soda stocksii (Boiss.) Akhani
20. Soda subglabra (Botsch.) Akhani
21. Soda zygophylla (Batt.) Akhani & Sukhor.
22. Soda zygophylloides (Aellen & C.C.Towns.) Akhani
