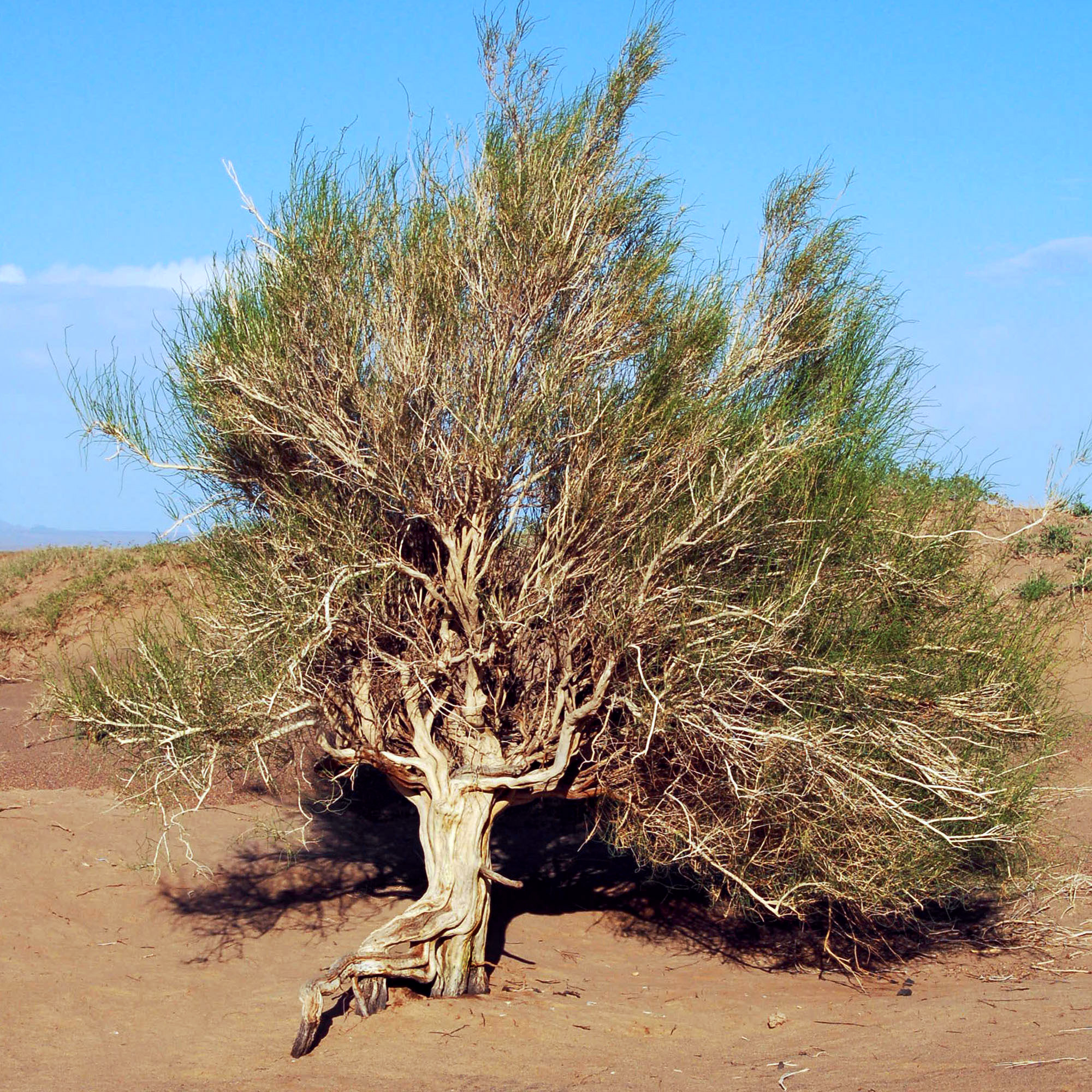
- Haloxylon ammodendron

Scientific classification
- Kingdom: Plantae
- Clade: Tracheophytes
- Clade: Angiosperms
- Clade: Eudicots
- Order: Caryophyllales
- Family: Amaranthaceae
- Subfamily: Salsoloideae
- Tribe: Salsoleae
- Genus: Haloxylon; Bunge ex Fenzl

= Haloxylon =

Genus of flowering plants

Haloxylon is a genus of shrubs or small trees, belonging to the plant family Amaranthaceae. Haloxylon and its species are known by the common name saxaul. "Saksaul" is a common Turkic word that entered Russian through Kazakh.

== Description ==
The species of genus Haloxylon are shrubs or small trees 1–8 metres (3 1/2–26 feet) (rarely up to 12 m or 39 ft) tall, with a thick trunk and many branches. The branches of the current year are green, from erect to pendant. The leaves are reduced to small scales. The inflorescences are short shoots borne on the stems of the previous year. The flowers are very small, as long or shorter than the bracteoles, bisexual or male. The two stigmas are very short. In fruit, the perianth segments develop spreading wings. The fruit with wings is about 8 millimetres (1/4 in) in diameter. The seed is about 1.5 mm (1/16 in) in diameter.

== Distribution and habitat ==
The genus Haloxylon is distributed in southwest and Central Asia, from Egypt to Mongolia and China (Xinjiang and Gansu), where it grows in sandy habitats (psammophyte).

== Taxonomy ==
The genus name Haloxylon (meaning "salt wood" in Greek) was published by Alexander Bunge (ex Eduard Fenzl) in 1851, with the type species Haloxylon ammodendron; it belongs to the subfamily Salsoloideae in the family Amaranthaceae. Plants of the World Online includes 11 species as of February 2026, as follows:

- Haloxylon ammodendron (C.A.Mey.) Bunge ex Fenzl – black saxaul
- Haloxylon gracile (Aellen) Hedge
- Haloxylon griffithii (Moq.) Boiss.
- Haloxylon multiflorum (Moq.) Bunge ex Boiss.
- Haloxylon negevensis (Iljin & Zohary) L.Boulos
- Haloxylon persicum Bunge – white saxaul
- Haloxylon salicornicum (Moq.) Bunge ex Boiss.
- Haloxylon schmittianum Pomel
- Haloxylon scoparium Pomel
- Haloxylon tamariscifolium (L.) Pau
- Haloxylon thomsonii Bunge ex Boiss.

Phylogenetic research revealed that several species formerly included in Haloxylon are not related to this genus. They are now classified to genus Hammada; the former Haloxylon stocksii (syn. Haloxylon recurvum) has been moved to Soda stocksii.

The common name saxaul, sometimes sacsaoul or saksaul, comes from the Russian саксаул (saksaul), which is from Kazakh сексеуiл (seksewil).

== Ecology ==
In the deserts of Central Asia, a large number of birds are associated with saxaul, including the saxaul sparrow.

== Uses ==
The trees are used by nomads across the steppes of Central Asia as firewood.

In the former bed of the Aral Sea, saxaul trees are being planted to stop the wind picking up contaminated sand from the dried up sea bed and spreading them through the atmosphere. The plan is to cover the entire former bed with a forest.
