= Flight call =

Bird vocalisation

Flight call of the European herring gull (Larus argentatus)

Flight calls are vocalisations made by birds in flight, often serving to keep flocks together.
