= Glasswort =

Common name for multiple species of plants

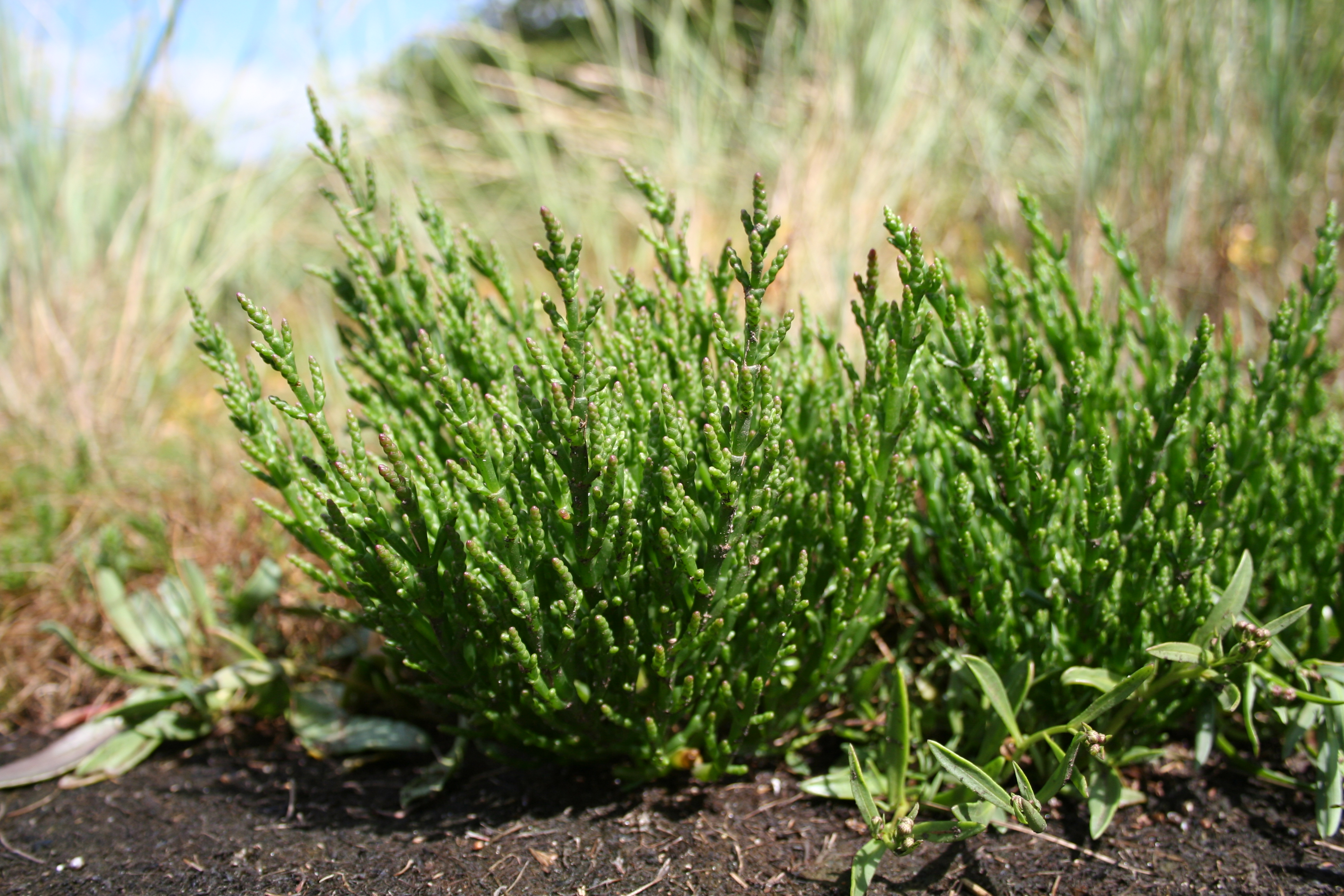
Salicornia europaea (common glasswort).

The glassworts are various succulent, annual halophytic plants, that is, plants that thrive in saline environments, such as seacoasts and salt marshes. The original English glasswort plants belong to the genus Salicornia, but today the glassworts include halophyte plants from several genera, some of which are native to continents unknown to the medieval English, and growing in ecosystems, such as mangrove swamps, never envisioned when the term glasswort was coined.

The common name "glasswort" came into use in the 16th century to describe plants growing in England whose ashes could be used for making soda-based (as opposed to potash-based) glass.

== Industrial uses ==
The ashes of glasswort plants, and also of their Mediterranean counterpart saltwort plants, yield soda ash, which is an important ingredient for glassmaking and soapmaking. Soda ash is an alkali whose active ingredient is now known to be sodium carbonate. Glasswort and saltwort plants sequester the sodium they absorb from salt water into their tissues (see Salsola soda). Ashing of the plants converts some of this sodium into sodium carbonate (or "soda", in one of the old uses of the term).

In the medieval and early post-medieval centuries, various glasswort plants were collected at tidal marshes and other saline places in the Mediterranean region. The collected plants were burned. The resulting ashes were mixed with water. Sodium carbonate is soluble in water. Non-soluble components of the ashes sank to the bottom of the water container. The water with the sodium carbonate dissolved in it was then transferred to another container, and then the water was evaporated off, leaving behind the sodium carbonate. Another major component of the ashes that is soluble in water is potassium carbonate, a.k.a. potash. The resulting product consisted mainly of a mixture of sodium carbonate and potassium carbonate. This product was called "soda ash" (it was also called "alkali"). It contained 20% to 30% sodium carbonate. For glassmaking, it was superior to a potash product obtained by the same procedure from the ashes of non-salty plants. If plant ashes were not washed as just described, they were still usable in glassmaking but the results were not as good.

The appearance of the word glasswort in English is reasonably contemporaneous with a 16th-century resurgence in English glassmaking, which had suffered a long decline after Roman times. This resurgence was led by glassmakers who emigrated to England from Lorraine and from Venice. The Lorraine glassmakers brought with them the technology of forest glass, the greenish glass that used potash from wood ashes as a flux. The Venetian glassmakers brought with them the technology of cristallo, the immaculately clear glass that used soda ash as a flux. These glassmakers would have recognized Salicornia europaea growing in England as a source for soda ash. Prior to their arrival, it was said that the plant "hath no name in English".

By the 18th century, Spain had an enormous industry producing soda ash from saltworts; the soda ash from this source was known as barrilla. Scotland had a large 18th-century industry producing soda ash from seaweed. The source of this ash was kelp. This industry was so lucrative that it led to overpopulation in the Western Isles of Scotland, and one estimate is that 100,000 people were occupied with "kelping" during the summer months. In the same period, soda ash (la soude de Narbonne) was produced in quantity from glasswort proper around Narbonne, France. The commercialization of the Leblanc process for synthesizing sodium carbonate (from salt, limestone, and sulfuric acid) brought an end to the era of farming for soda ash in the first half of the 19th century.

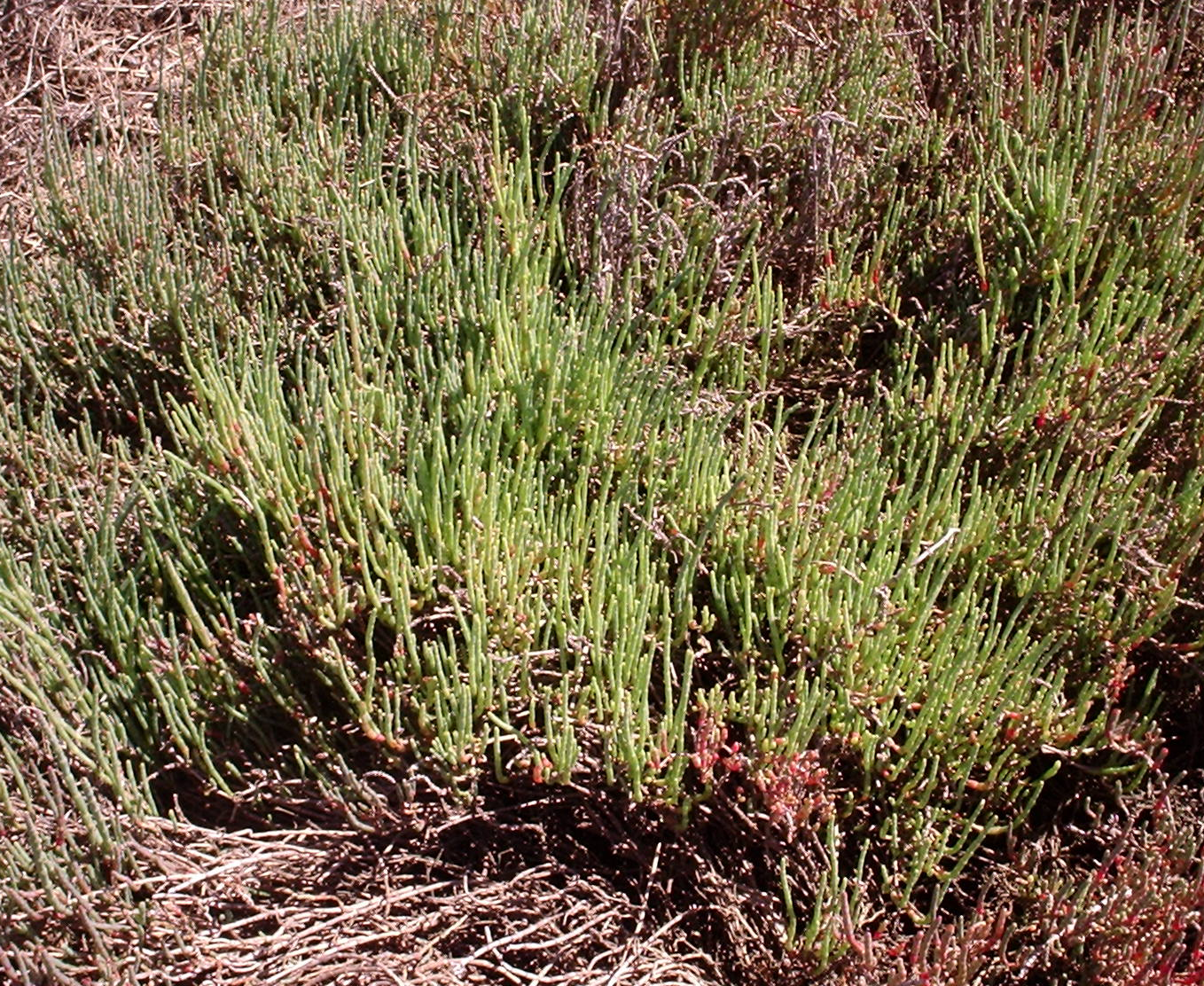
Tecticornia pergranulata (blackseed glasswort).

== Culinary uses ==
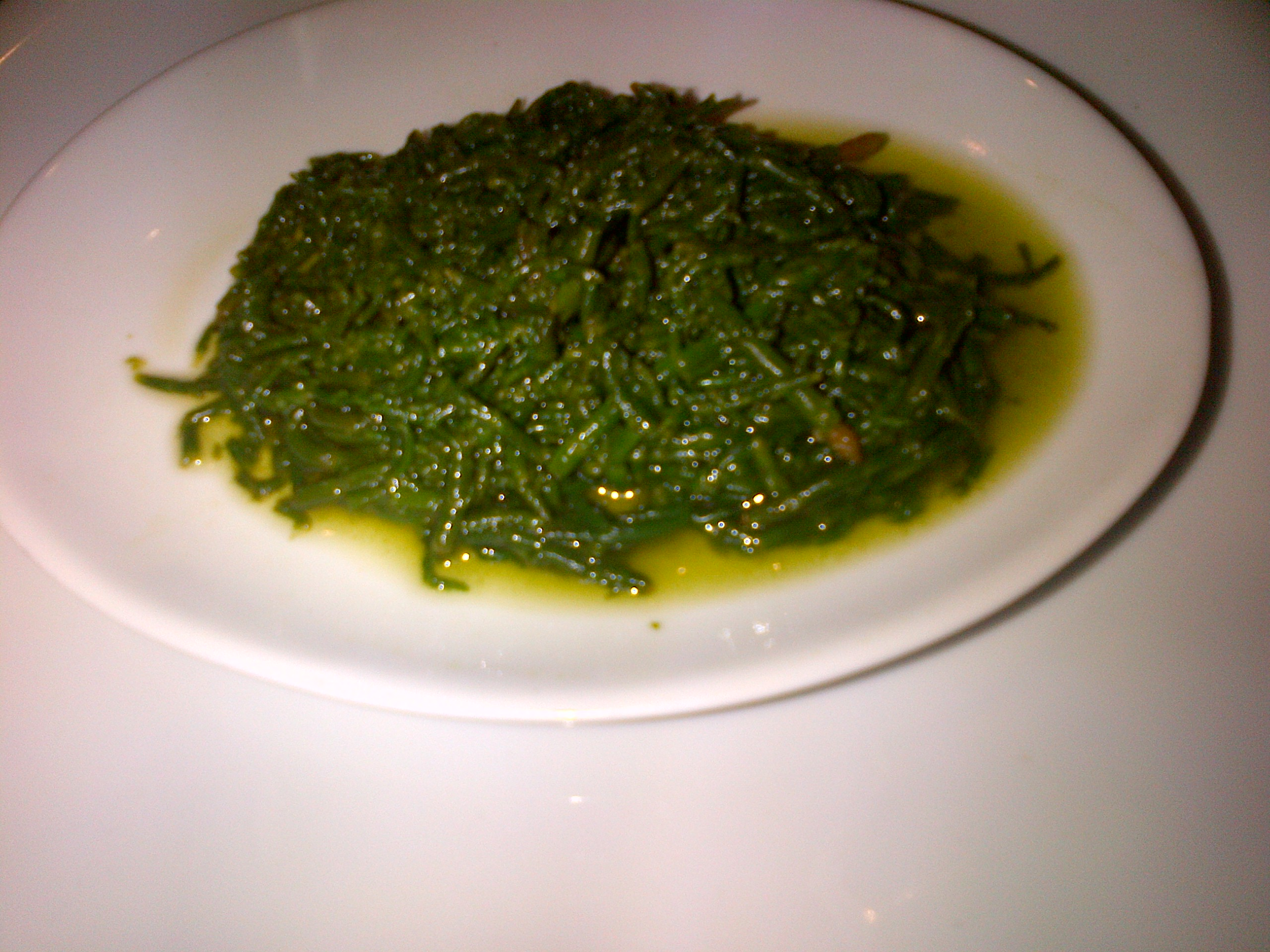
Glasswort salad

Young shoots of Salicornia europaea are tender and can be eaten raw as a salad: glasswort salad or samphire salad (Turkish: Deniz börülcesi salatası). This salad is a part of Turkish cuisine, also made with lemon juice, olive oil and garlic. It is commonly served as a meze. The shoots can also be pickled.

The plant can further be prepared in several ways – cooked, steamed, or stir fried – and eaten as a vegetable dish.

== Glasswort species ==
Plants that have been called glassworts include:

- Arthroceras subterminale (Parish's glasswort)
- Eriogonum salicornioides (glasswort buckwheat)
- Species in the genus Salicornia (glasswort or jointed glasswort):
  - Salicornia bigelovii (dwarf glasswort)
  - Salicornia blackiana (thick-head glasswort)
  - Salicornia europaea (common glasswort or marsh samphire)
  - Salicornia maritima (slender glasswort)
  - Salicornia pacifica (Pacific glasswort)
  - Salicornia perennis (perennial glasswort)
  - Salicornia quinqueflora (beaded glasswort)
  - Salicornia ramosissima (purple glasswort)
  - Salicornia virginica (American, Virginia or woody glasswort)
- Salsola kali (prickly glasswort)
- Tecticornia:
  - Tecticornia arbuscula (shrubby glasswort)
  - Tecticornia flabelliformis (bead glasswort)
  - Tecticornia pergranulata (blackseed glasswort)

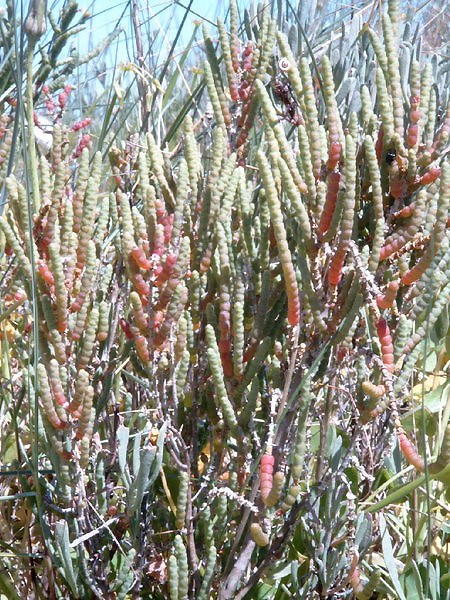
Salicornia perennis (perennial glasswort)
