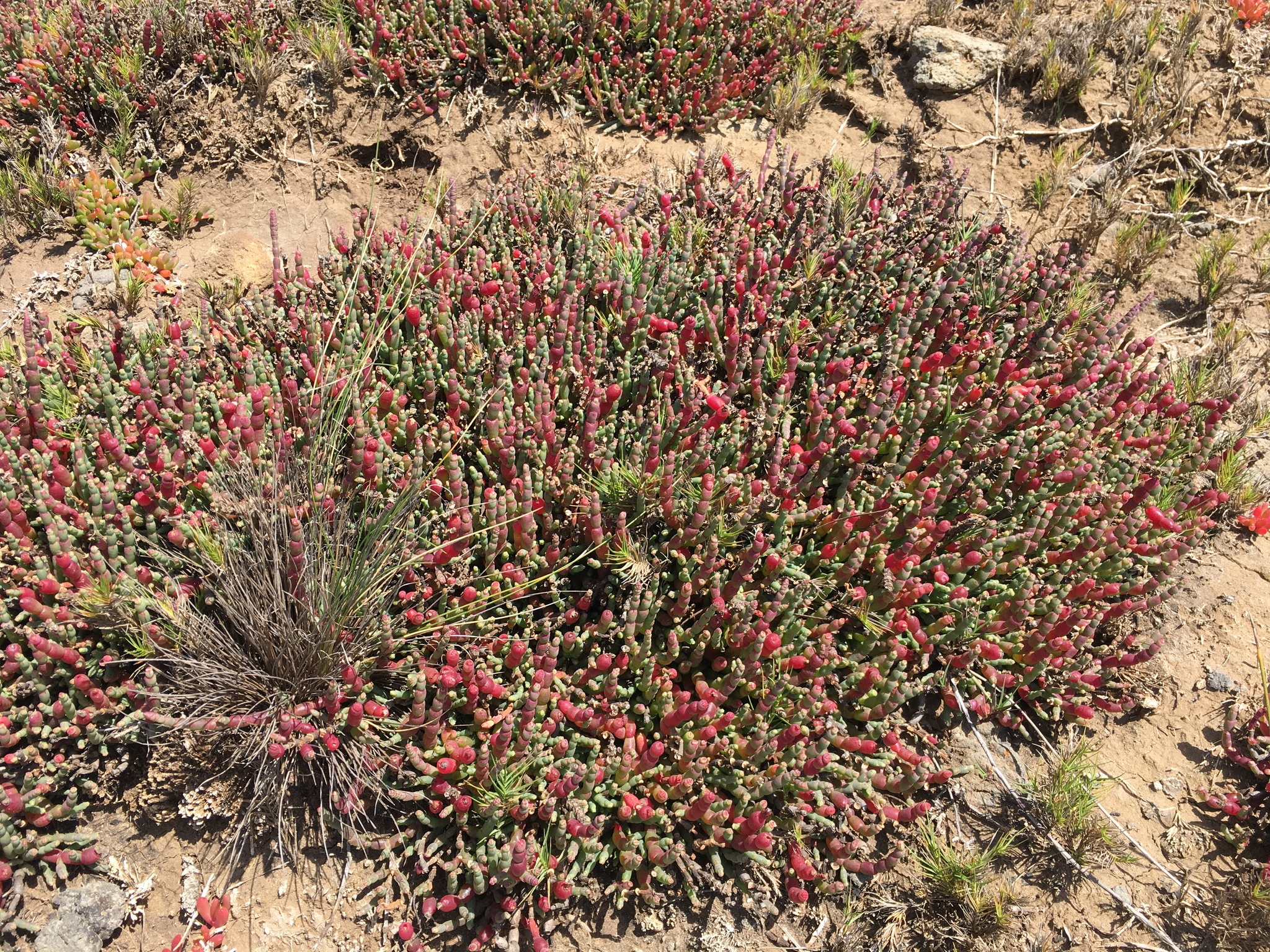
- Specimen growing in Tasmania, Australia.
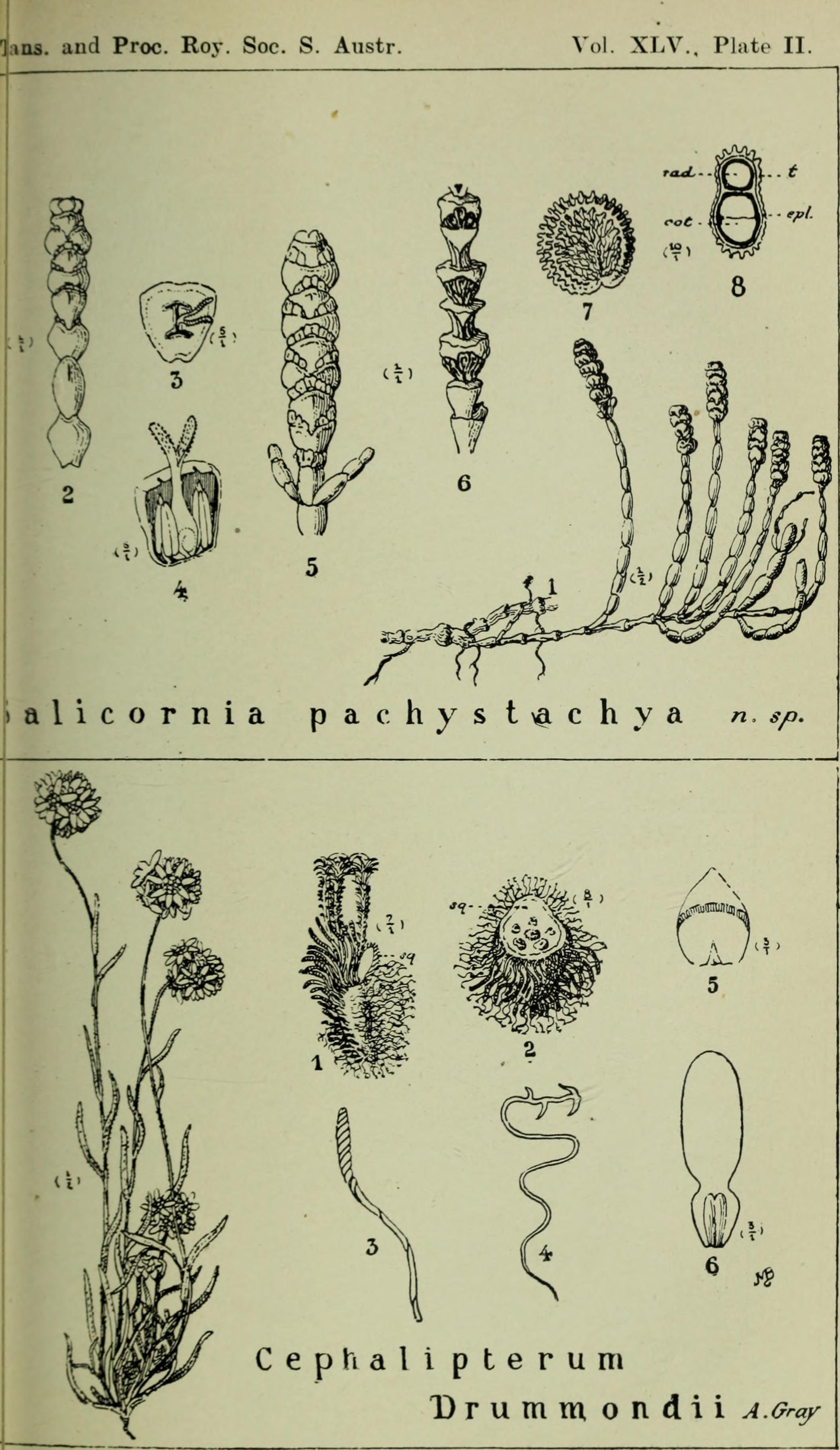
- Salicornia blackiana (upper illustration)

Scientific classification
- Kingdom: Plantae
- Clade: Tracheophytes
- Clade: Angiosperms
- Clade: Eudicots
- Order: Caryophyllales
- Family: Amaranthaceae
- Genus: Salicornia
- Species: S. blackiana

Binomial name
- Salicornia blackiana Ulbr.

Synonyms
- Salicornia pachystachya J.M.Black; Sarcocornia blackiana (Ulbr.) A.J.Scott

= Salicornia blackiana =

Species of plant

Salicornia blackiana, synonym Sarcocornia blackiana, commonly known as thick-head glasswort, is a species of succulent halophytic shrub. It is widespread in southern and western Australia, including Tasmania. Its preferred habitats are estuaries, swamps and periodically waterlogged saline areas.

== Description ==
It grows as an erect or decumbent perennial herb with succulent, stem-like leaves, growing up to 0.8 m in height. It is very similar to the better known beaded glasswort but is a larger plant and differs in having a thicker fruiting spike, 4–9 mm in diameter, and seeds with blunt hairs or papillae.
