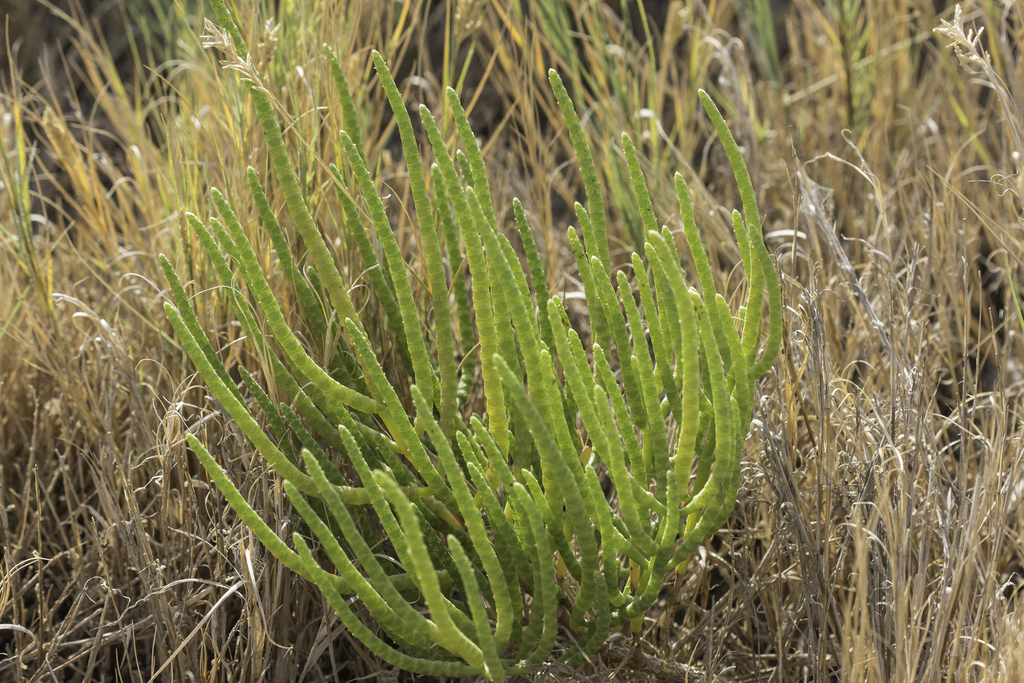

Scientific classification
- Kingdom: Plantae
- Clade: Tracheophytes
- Clade: Angiosperms
- Clade: Eudicots
- Order: Caryophyllales
- Family: Amaranthaceae
- Genus: Salicornia
- Species: S. utahensis

Binomial name
- Salicornia utahensis Tidestr.

Synonyms
- Salicornia pacifica var. utahensis (Tidestr.) Munz; Sarcocornia utahensis (Tidestr.) A.J.Scott

= Salicornia utahensis =

Species of plant

Salicornia utahensis, synonym Sarcocornia utahensis, is a species of flowering plant in the amaranth family known by the common name Utah swampfire. It is native to the southwestern United States, where it can be found in desert habitat, generally in areas with alkaline or saline soils, such as playas. This halophytic perennial herb or subshrub grows in low matted clumps of woody stem bases anchored to the substrate by rhizome systems. The stem grows erect into fleshy green branches. The inflorescences are within the distal parts of the branches, which are ringed with tiny flat flowers.
