= Samphire =

Common name for multiple species of plants

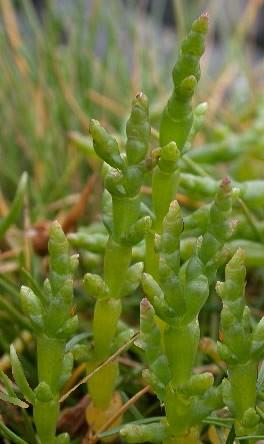
Norfolk Samphire (Salicornia europaea)

Samphire is a name given to a number of succulent salt-tolerant plants (halophytes) that tend to be associated with water bodies.

- Rock samphire (Crithmum maritimum) is a coastal species with white flowers that grows in Ireland, the United Kingdom and the Isle of Man. This is probably the species mentioned by Shakespeare in King Lear.
- Golden samphire (Limbarda crithmoides) is a coastal species with yellow flowers that grows across Eurasia.
- Several species in the genus Salicornia, known as "marsh samphire" in Britain.
- Blutaparon vermiculare, Central America, southeastern North America
- Tecticornia, Australia
- Sarcocornia, cosmopolitan

Following the construction of the Channel Tunnel, the nature reserve created on new land near Folkestone made from excavated rock was named "Samphire Hoe", a name coined by Mrs Gillian Janaway.

== Etymology ==
Originally "sampiere", a corruption of the French "Saint Pierre" (Saint Peter), samphire was named after the patron saint of fishermen because all of the original plants with its name grow in rocky salt-sprayed regions along the sea coast of northern Europe or in its coastal marsh areas. It is sometimes called rock samphire or seafennel. In North Wales, especially along the River Dee's marshes, it has long been known as sampkin.

== Uses ==
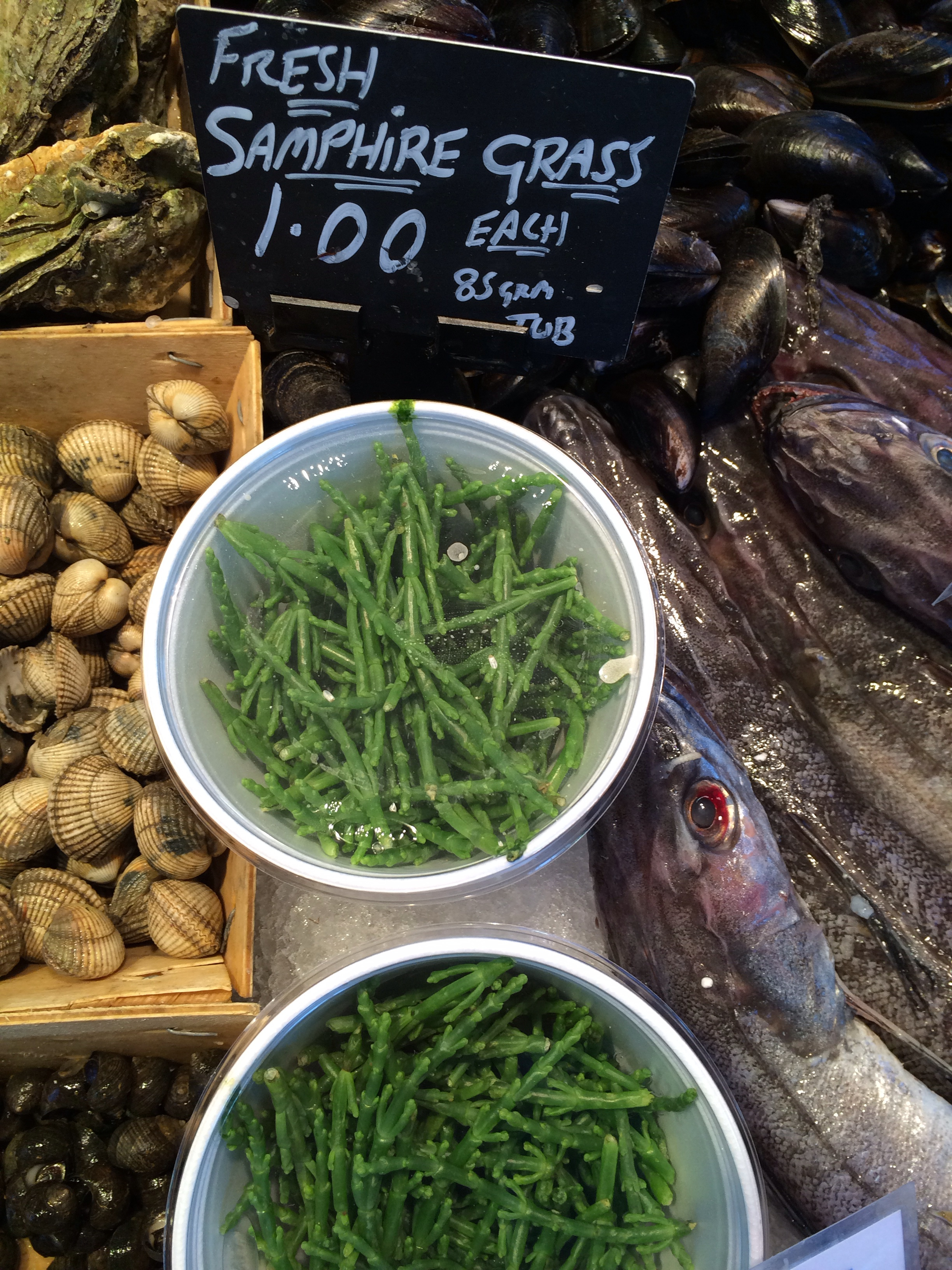
Fresh samphire from the River Loughor estuary for sale at Swansea Market

Marsh samphire ashes were used to make soap and glass (hence its other old name in English, "glasswort") as it is a source of sodium carbonate, also known as soda ash. In the 14th century glassmakers located their workshops near regions where this plant grew, since it was so closely linked to their trade. Many samphires are edible. In England the leaves were gathered early in the year and pickled or eaten in salads with oil and vinegar. Marsh samphire (Salicornia bigelovii) was investigated as a potential biodiesel source that can be grown in coastal areas where conventional crops cannot be grown.

Rock samphire is another kind of samphire, also called sea fennel. It is mentioned by Shakespeare in King Lear:

Half-way down Hangs one that gathers samphire; dreadful trade!

— Act IV, Scene VI, lines 14–15

This refers to the dangers involved in collecting rock samphire on sea cliffs.

Aboriginal Australians have long used samphire as bush tucker, due to its abundance, flavour, and nutritional value. It is high in Vitamin A and a good source of calcium and iron. Other Australians have recently discovered the potential of the species as a food plant and it has begun to appear on restaurant menus across the country.

A variety of rock samphire known as Paccasasso del Conero, or sea fennel, is well known in Italy along the Adriatic coast. This variety is typically used in local recipes such as a mortadella and paccasasso sandwich, pasta with mussels and paccasassi, or in fresh salad.
