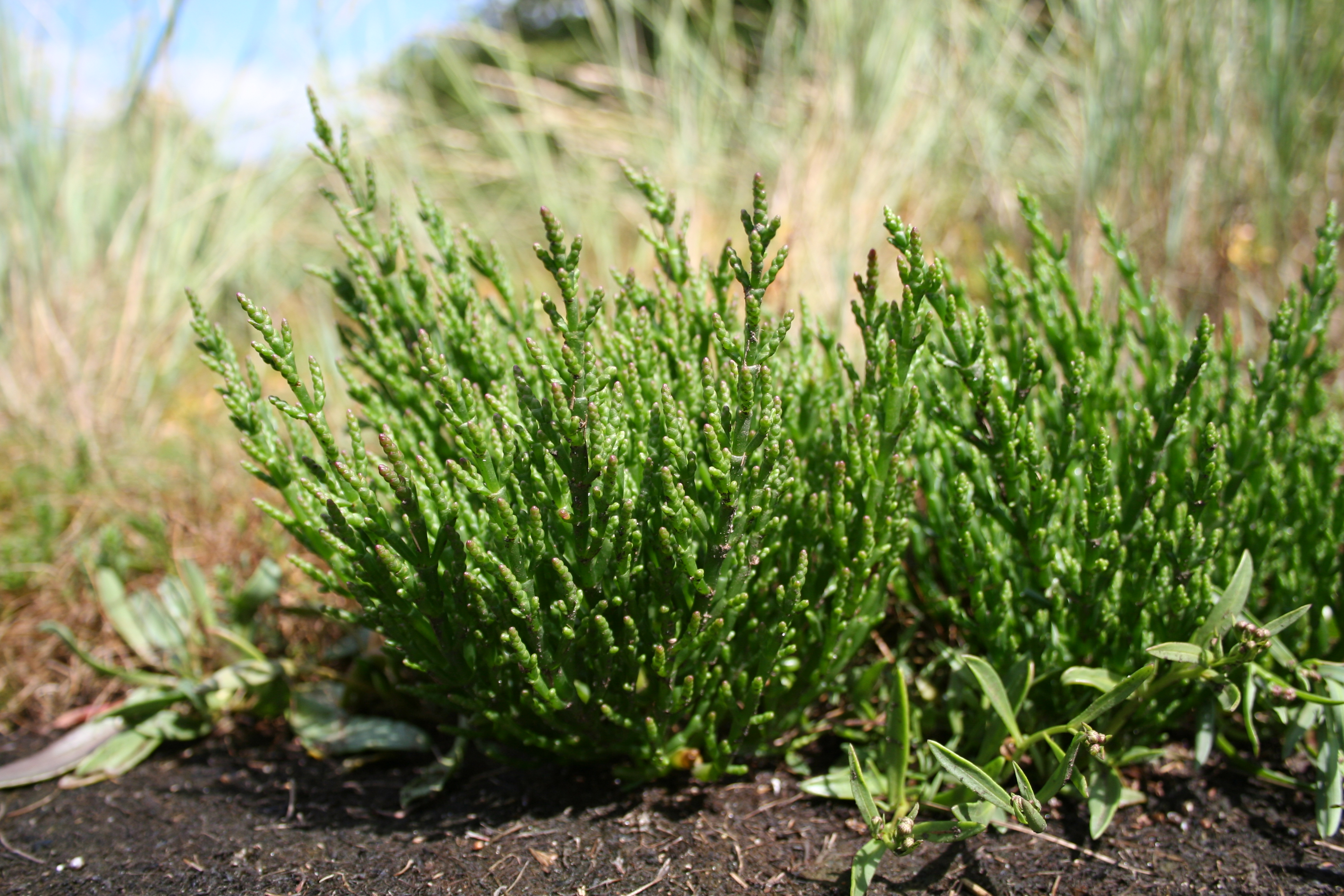
- Salicornia europaea

Scientific classification
- Kingdom: Plantae
- Clade: Tracheophytes
- Clade: Angiosperms
- Clade: Eudicots
- Order: Caryophyllales
- Family: Amaranthaceae
- Subfamily: Salicornioideae
- Genus: Salicornia; L.

Species
- See text

= Salicornia =

Genus of flowering plants

Salicornia is a genus of succulent, halophytic (salt tolerant) flowering plants in the family Amaranthaceae that grow in salt marshes, on beaches, and among mangroves. Salicornia species are native to North America, Europe, central Asia, and southern Africa. Common names for the genus include glasswort, pickleweed, picklegrass, and marsh samphire; these common names are also used for some species not in Salicornia. To French speakers in Atlantic Canada, they are known colloquially as tétines de souris ('mouse tits'). The main European species is often eaten, called marsh samphire in Britain, and the main North American species is occasionally sold in grocery stores or appears on restaurant menus as sea beans, samphire greens, or sea asparagus.

== Description ==
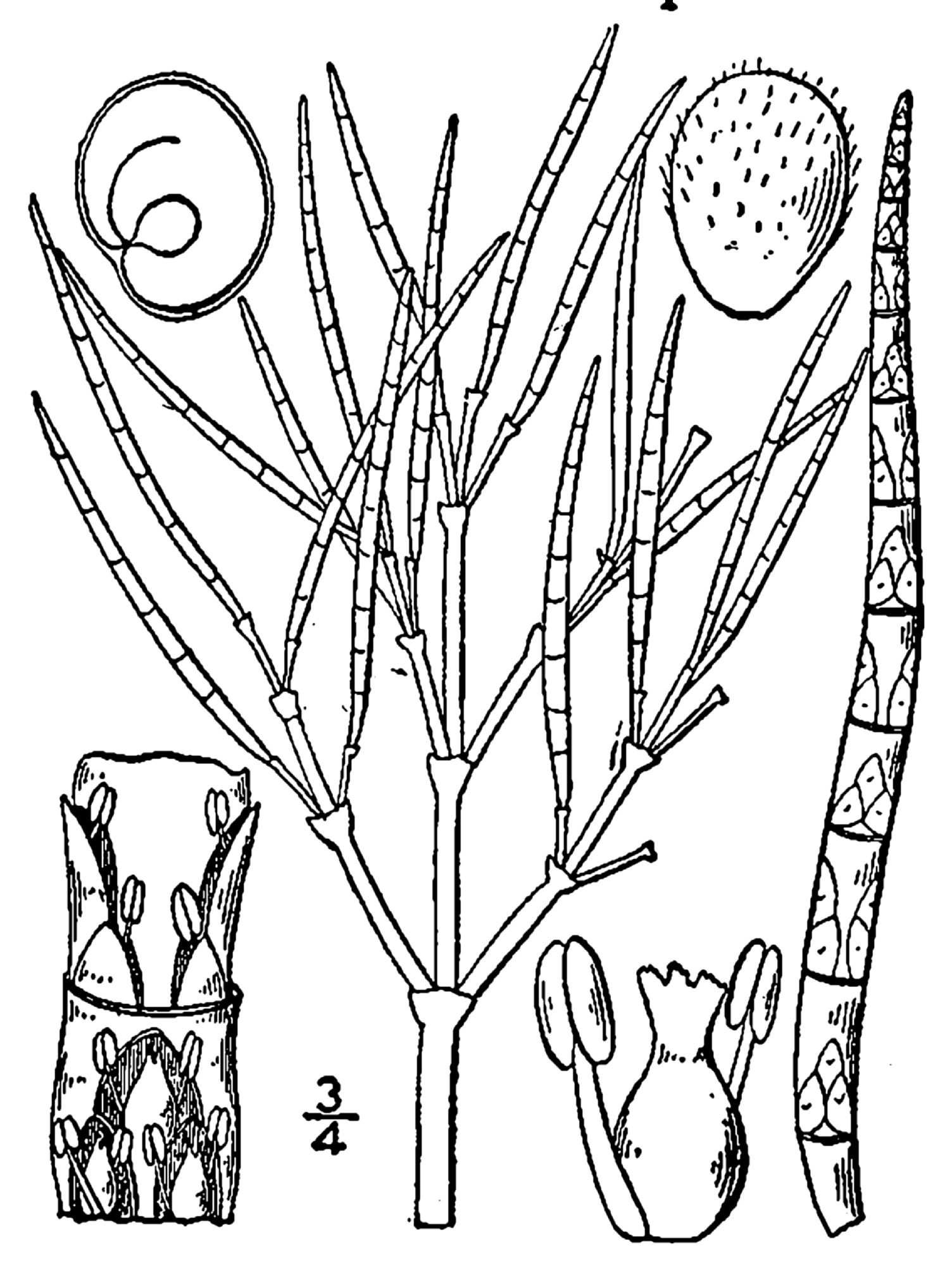
Illustration of Salicornia maritima

The Salicornia species are small annual herbs. They grow prostrate to erect, their simple or branched stems are succulent, hairless, and appear to be jointed. The opposite leaves are strongly reduced to small fleshy scales with a narrow dry margin, hairless, unstalked and united at the base, thus enclosing and forming a succulent sheath around the stem, which gives it the appearance of being composed of jointed segments. Many species are green, but their foliage turns red in autumn. Older stems may be somewhat woody basally.

All stems terminate in spike-like apparently jointed inflorescences. Each joint consists of two opposite minute bracts with a (1-) 3-flowered cyme tightly embedded in cavities of the main axis and partly hidden by the bracts. The flowers are arranged in a triangle, both lateral flowers beneath the central flower. The hermaphrodite flowers are more or less radially symmetric, with a perianth of three fleshy tepals united nearly to the apex. There are 1–2 stamens and an ovary with two stigmas.

The perianth is persistent in fruit. The fruit wall (pericarp) is membranous. The vertical seed is ellipsoid, with yellowish brown, membranous, hairy seed coat. The seed contains no perisperm (feeding tissue).

Like most members of the subfamily Salicornioideae, Salicornia species use the C_{3} carbon fixation pathway to take in carbon dioxide from the surrounding atmosphere.

== Taxonomy ==
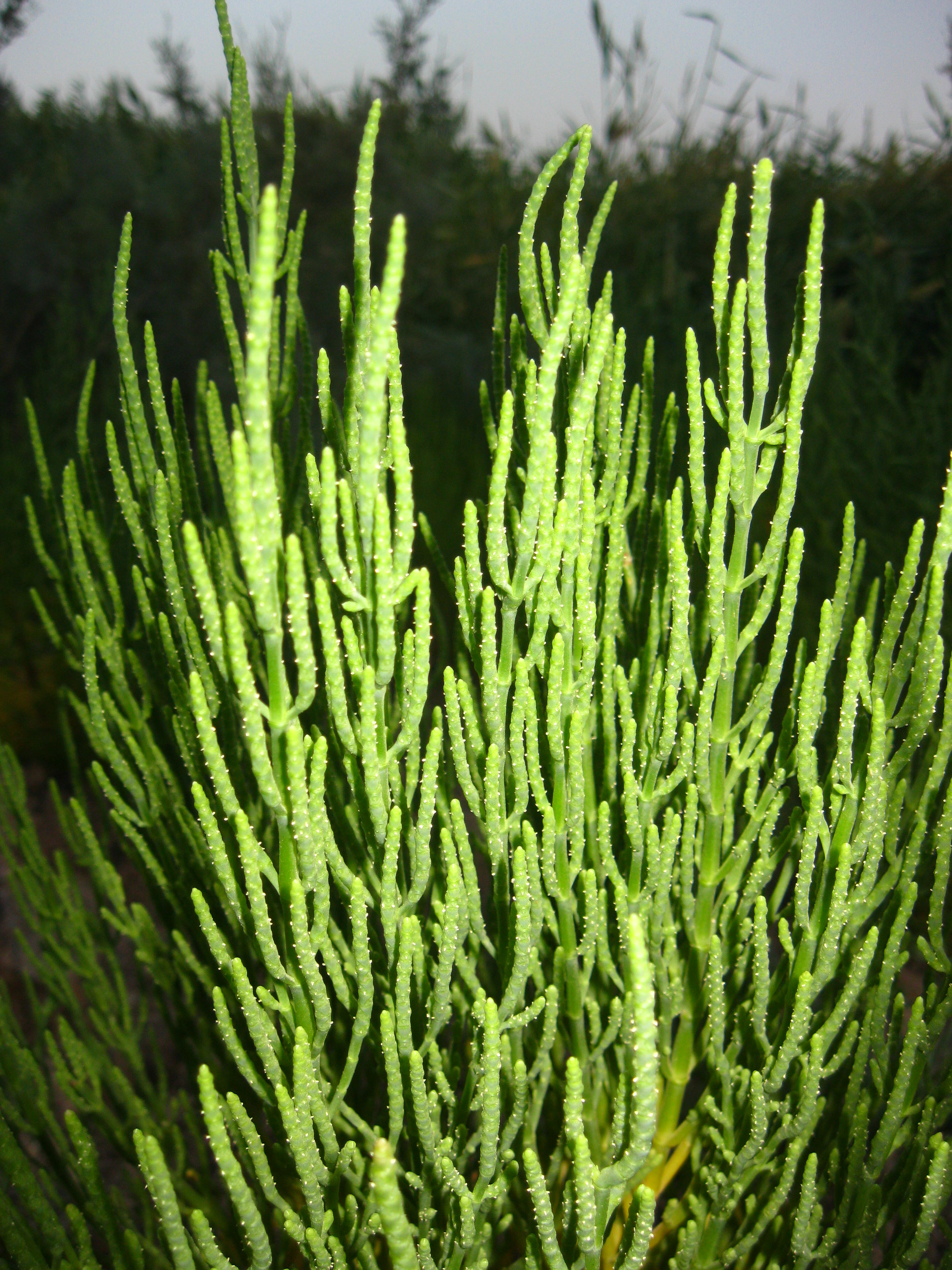
Salicornia europaea

The genus Salicornia was first described in 1753 by Carl Linnaeus. The annual Salicornia europaea was selected as the type species.

The genus probably originated during the Miocene in the region between the Mediterranean Basin and Central Asia. Evolving from within the perennial and frost-sensitive former genus Sarcocornia (now shown to be paraphyletic), the annual, strongly inbreeding and frost-tolerant Salicornia diversified during the late Pliocene to early Pleistocene. By events of intercontinental dispersals, they reached southern Africa twice and North America at least three times. Two tetraploid lineages expanded rapidly, with the ability to colonize lower belts of the salt marshes than their diploid relatives. Inbreeding and geographical isolation led to a large number of reproductive isolated species that are only weakly differentiated.

The taxonomic classification of this genus is extremely difficult (with one paper calling it a "taxonomic nightmare"). The determination of species seems almost impossible for non-specialists. The reasons for these difficulties are the reduced habit with weak morphological differentiation and high phenotypic variability. As the succulent plants lose their characteristics while drying, herbarium specimens often cannot be determined with certainty and are less suited for taxonomic studies.

Molecular phylogenetic studies have regularly revised the circumscription of the genus. It was considered distinct from Sarcocornia in 2007 and 2012 studies. A 2017 study resulted in Sarcocornia being sunk into Salicornia – despite being the first perennial, substantially increasing the size of the genus, which was divided into four subgenera.

=== Species ===
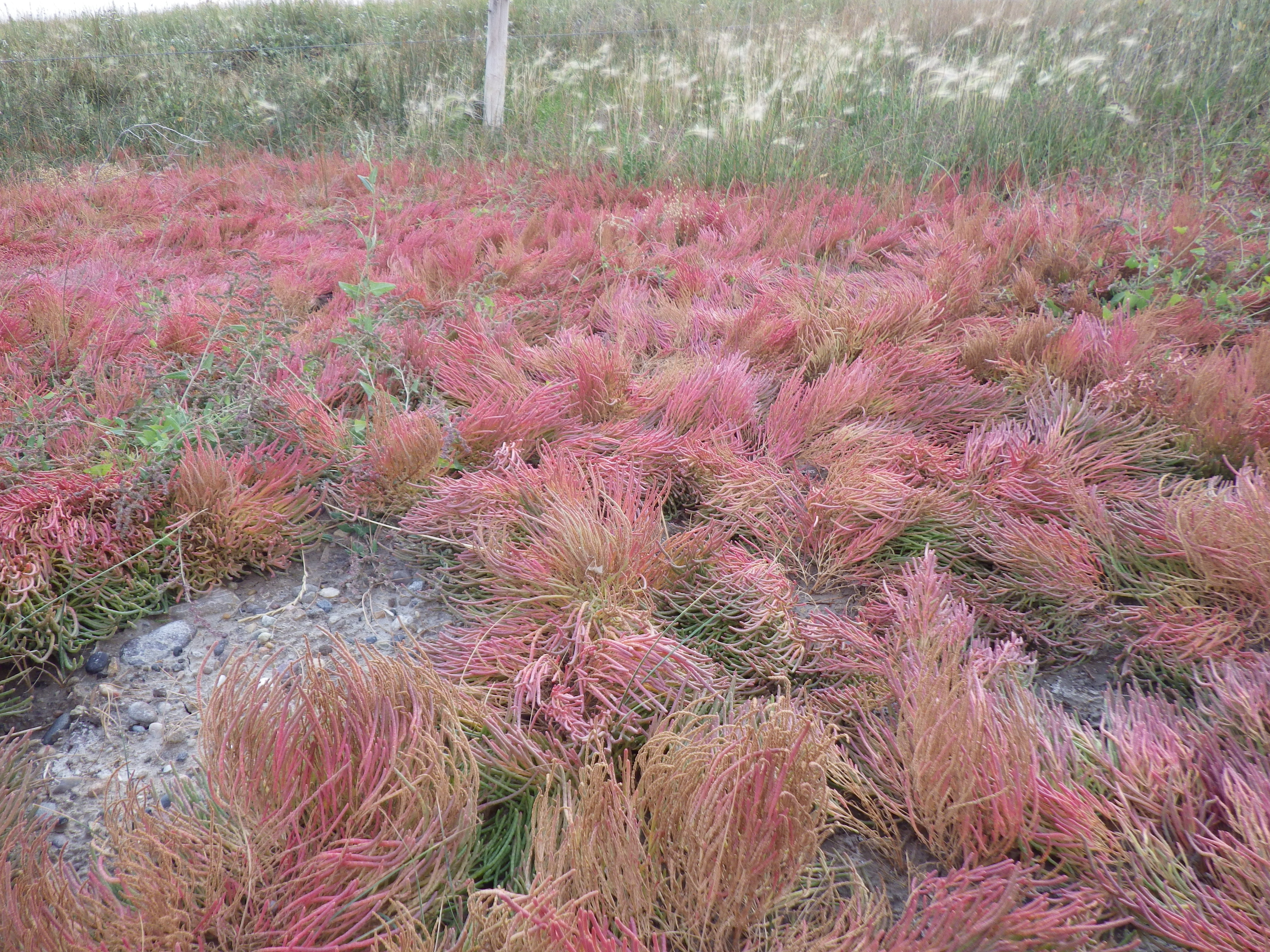
S. rubra at a saline inland habitat

As of April 2022, Plants of the World Online accepted the following species:

- Salicornia alpini Lag.
- Salicornia ambigua Michx.
- Salicornia andina Phil.
- Salicornia bigelovii Torr.
- Salicornia blackiana Ulbr.
- Salicornia brachiata Roxb.
- Salicornia capensis (Moss) Piirainen & G.Kadereit
- Salicornia crassispica G.L.Chu
- Salicornia cuscoensis Gutte & G.K.Müll. ex Freitag, M.Á.Alonso & M.B.Crespo
- Salicornia decumbens (Toelken) Piirainen & G.Kadereit
- Salicornia decussata (S.Steffen, Mucina & G.Kadereit) Piirainen & G.Kadereit
- Salicornia disarticulata Moss
- Salicornia dunensis (Moss ex Adamson) Piirainen & G.Kadereit
- Salicornia erectispica G.L.Chu
- Salicornia europaea L.
- Salicornia fruticosa (L.) L.
- Salicornia globosa (Paul G.Wilson) Piirainen & G.Kadereit
- Salicornia helmutii Piirainen & G.Kadereit
- Salicornia hispanica (Fuente, Rufo & Sánchez Mata) Piirainen & G.Kadereit
- Salicornia lagascae (Fuente, Rufo & Sánchez Mata) Piirainen & G.Kadereit
- Salicornia littorea (Moss) Piirainen & G.Kadereit
- Salicornia magellanica Phil.
- Salicornia maritima S.L.Wolff & Jefferies
- Salicornia × marshallii (Lambinon & Vanderp.) Stace
- Salicornia meyeriana Moss
- Salicornia mossambicensis (Brenan) Piirainen & G.Kadereit
- Salicornia mossiana (Toelken) Piirainen & G.Kadereit
- Salicornia natalensis Bunge ex Ung.-Sternb.
- Salicornia neei Lag.
- Salicornia nitens P.W.Ball & Tutin
- Salicornia obclavata (Yaprak) Piirainen & G.Kadereit
- Salicornia obscura P.W.Ball & Tutin
- Salicornia pachystachya Bunge ex Ung.-Sternb.
- Salicornia pacifica Standl.
- Salicornia perennans Willd.
- Salicornia perennis Mill.
- Salicornia perrieri A.Chev.
- Salicornia persica Akhani
- Salicornia perspolitana Akhani
- Salicornia praecox A.Chev.
- Salicornia procumbens Sm.
- Salicornia pruinosa (Fuente, Rufo & Sánchez Mata) Piirainen & G.Kadereit
- Salicornia pulvinata R.E.Fr.
- Salicornia quinqueflora Bunge ex Ung.-Sternb.
- Salicornia rubra A.Nelson
- Salicornia senegalensis A.Chev.
- Salicornia sinus-persica Akhani
- Salicornia tegetaria (S.Steffen, Mucina & G.Kadereit) Piirainen & G.Kadereit
- Salicornia terminalis (Toelken) Piirainen & G.Kadereit
- Salicornia uniflora Toelken
- Salicornia utahensis Tidestr.
- Salicornia virginica L.
- Salicornia xerophila (Toelken) Piirainen & G.Kadereit

== Distribution and habitat ==
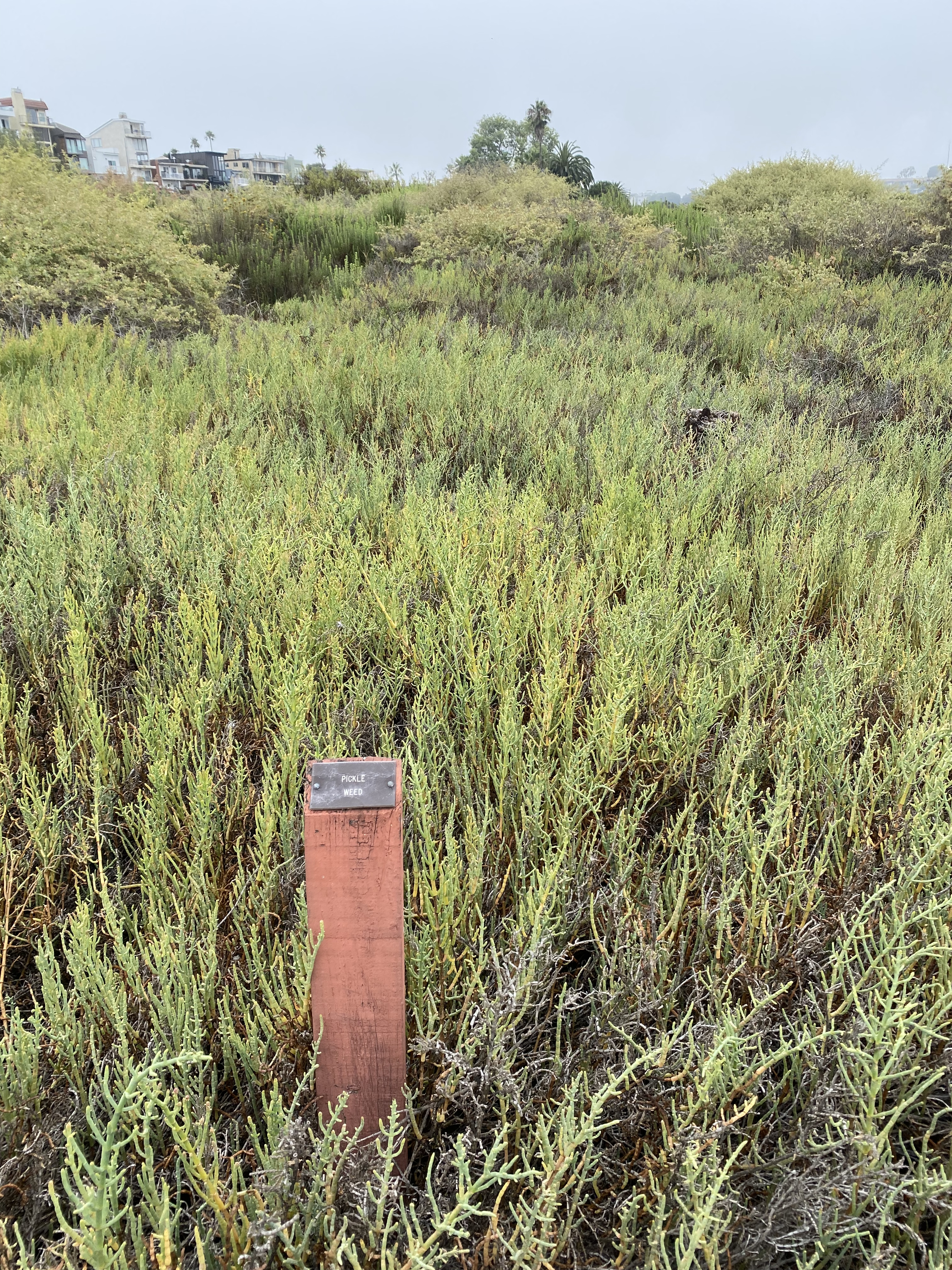
Salicornia at Ballona Wetlands, Southern California

The species of Salicornia are widely distributed over the Northern Hemisphere and in southern Africa, ranging from the subtropics to subarctic regions. There is one species present in New Zealand.

They grow in coastal salt marshes and in inland salty habitats like shores of salt lakes. Salicornia species are halophytes and can generally tolerate immersion in salt water (hygrohalophytes).

== Ecology ==
Salicornia species are used as food plants by the larvae of some Lepidoptera species, including the Coleophora case-bearers C. atriplicis and C. salicorniae; the latter feeds exclusively on Salicornia spp.

== Uses ==
=== Culinary ===
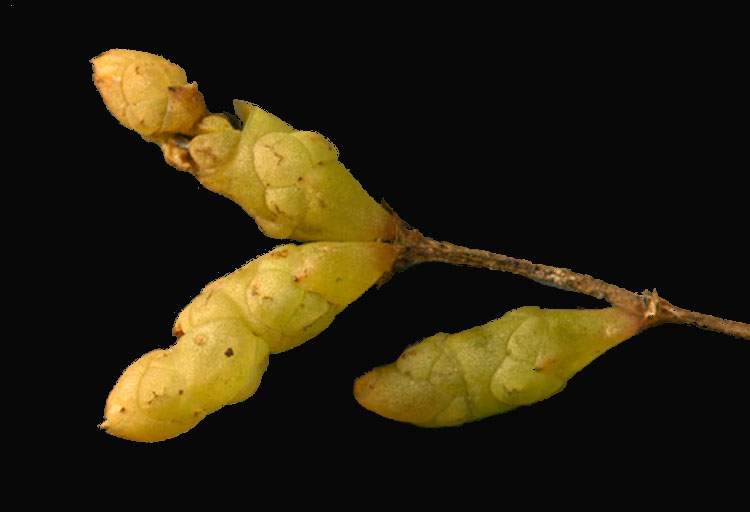
Salicornia bigelovii

S. europaea is edible, either cooked or raw, as are S. rubra and S. depressa. In England, S. europaea is one of several plants known as samphire (including rock samphire); the term samphire is believed to be a corruption of the French name, [herbe de] Saint-Pierre, which means "St. Peter's herb".

In Hawaii, where it is known as "sea asparagus", it is often blanched and used as a topping for salads or accompaniment for fish.

In addition to S. europaea, the seeds of S. bigelovii yield an edible oil. S. bigelovii's edibility is compromised somewhat because it contains saponins, which are toxic under certain conditions.

Umari keerai (S. brachiata) is cooked and eaten or pickled. It is also used as fodder for cattle, sheep, and goats. In Kalpitiya, Sri Lanka, it is used to feed donkeys.

On the east coast of Canada, the plant is known as "samphire greens" and is a local delicacy. In southeast Alaska, it is known as beach asparagus. In Nova Scotia, Canada, they are known as crow's foot greens. In British Columbia, they are known as sea asparagus. In the United States, they are known as "sea beans" when used for culinary purposes. Other names include sea green bean, sea pickle, and marsh samphire.

In India, researchers at the Central Salt and Marine Chemicals Research Institute developed a process to yield culinary salt from S. brachiata. The resulting product is known as vegetable salt and sold under the brand name Saloni.

Dehydrated, pulverized Salicornia is sold under the brand name "Green Salt" as a salt substitute claimed to be as salty in taste as table salt, but with less sodium.

=== Pharmacological research ===
In South Korea, Phyto Corporation has developed a technology of extracting low-sodium salt from S. europaea, a salt-accumulating plant. The company claims that the naturally derived plant salt is effective in treating high blood pressure and fatty liver disease by reducing sodium intake. The company has also developed a desalted Salicornia powder containing antioxidative and antithrombus polyphenols, claimed to be effective in treating obesity and arteriosclerosis, as well as providing a means to help resolve global food shortages.

=== Environmental uses ===
Pickleweed is used in phytoextraction. It is highly effective at removing selenium from soil, which is absorbed by the plant and then released into the atmosphere to be dispersed by prevailing winds. Pickleweed (S. bigelovii) has been found to have average volatilization rates 10–100 times higher than other species.

=== Industrial use ===
==== Historical ====
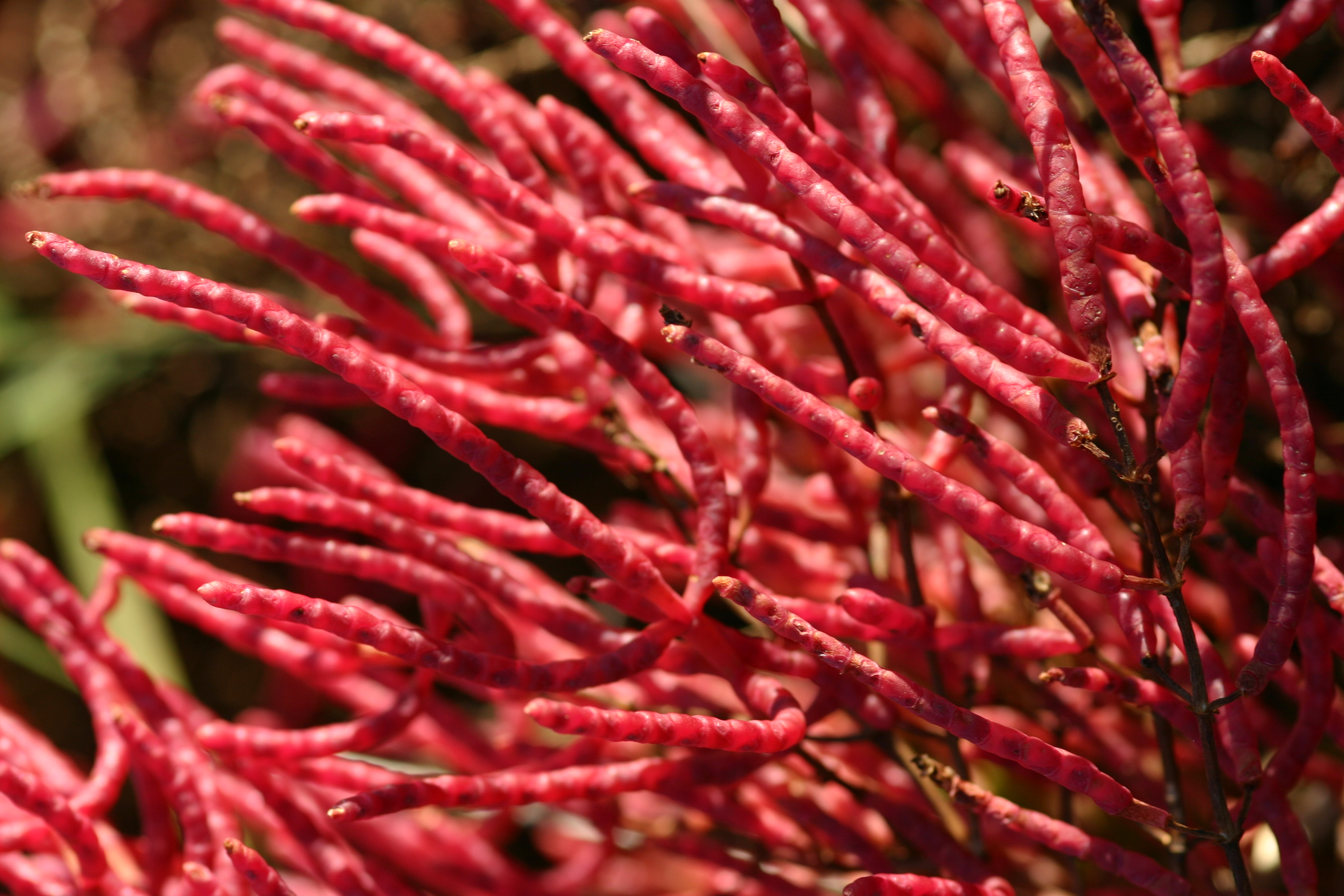
Salicornia virginica

The ashes of glasswort and saltwort plants and of kelp were long used as a source of soda ash (mainly sodium carbonate) for glassmaking and soapmaking. The introduction of the LeBlanc process for industrial production of soda ash superseded the use of plant sources in the first half of the 19th century.

Umari keerai is used as raw material in paper and board factories.

==== Contemporary ====
Because S. bigelovii can be grown using saltwater and its seeds contain high levels of unsaturated oil (30 wt. %, mostly linoleic acid) and protein (35 wt. %), it can be used to produce animal feedstuff and as a biofuel feedstock on coastal land where conventional crops cannot be grown. Adding nitrogen-based fertiliser to the seawater appears to increase the rate of growth and the eventual height of the plant, and the effluent from marine aquaculture (e.g. shrimp farming) is a suggested use for this purpose.

Experimental fields of Salicornia have been planted in Ras al-Zawr (Saudi Arabia), Eritrea (northeast Africa), and Sonora (northwest Mexico) aimed at the production of biodiesel. The company responsible for the Sonora trials (Global Seawater) claims between 225 and 250 gallons of BQ-9000 biodiesel can be produced per hectare (approximately 2.5 acres) of salicornia, and is promoting a $35 million scheme to create a 12,000-acre (49 km^{2}) salicornia farm in Bahia de Kino.

Stems and roots of S. brachiata plants have a high cellulose content (ca. 30 wt. %), whereas tender stem tips exhibit a low cellulose content (9.2 wt. %). S. brachiata revealed the dominance of rhamnose, arabinose, mannose, galactose, and glucose, with meager presence of ribose and xylose in their structural polysaccharide.

== See also ==
- Arid Forest Research Institute
- Batis
- Sea grapes
