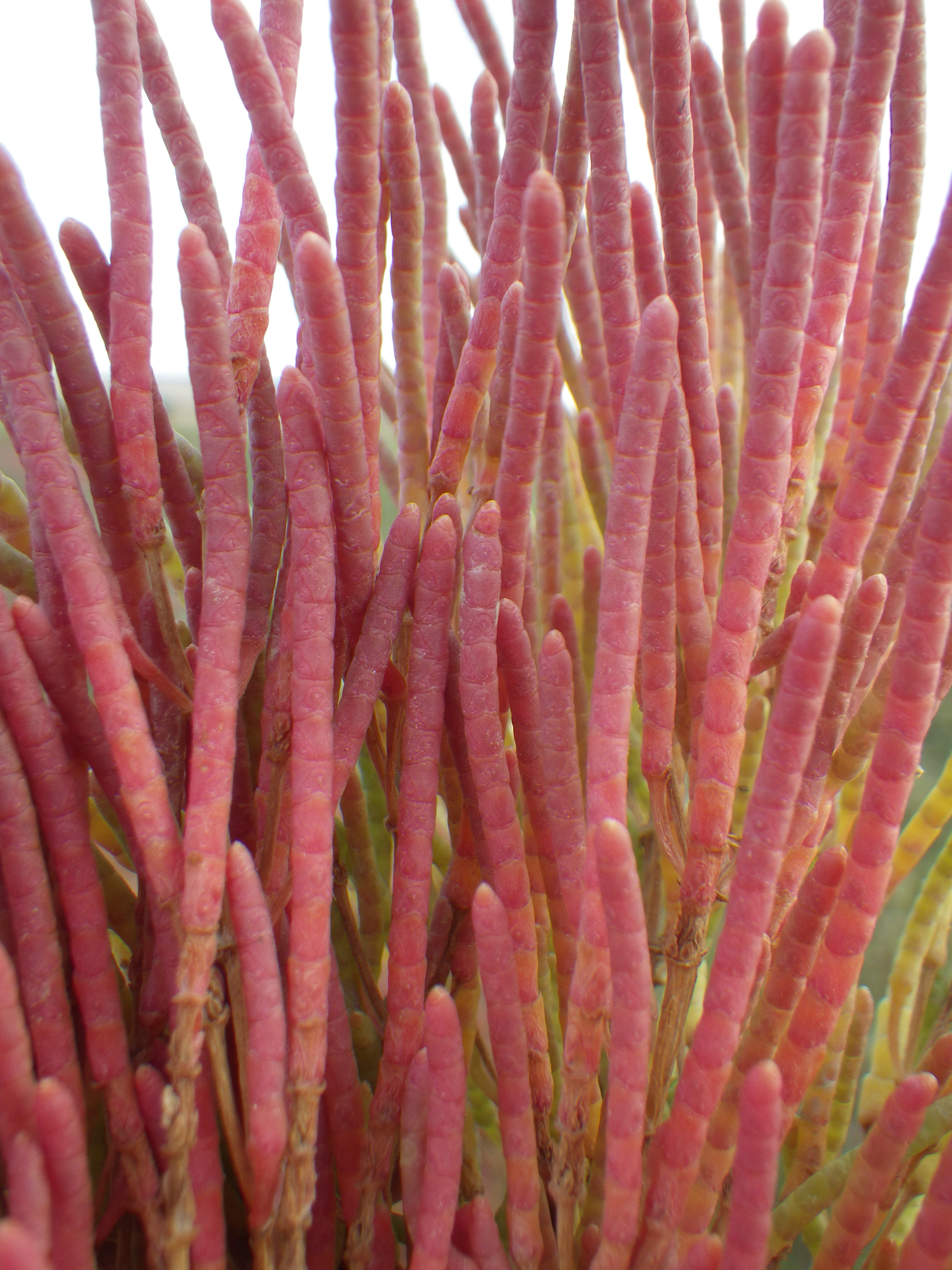
- Inflorescences
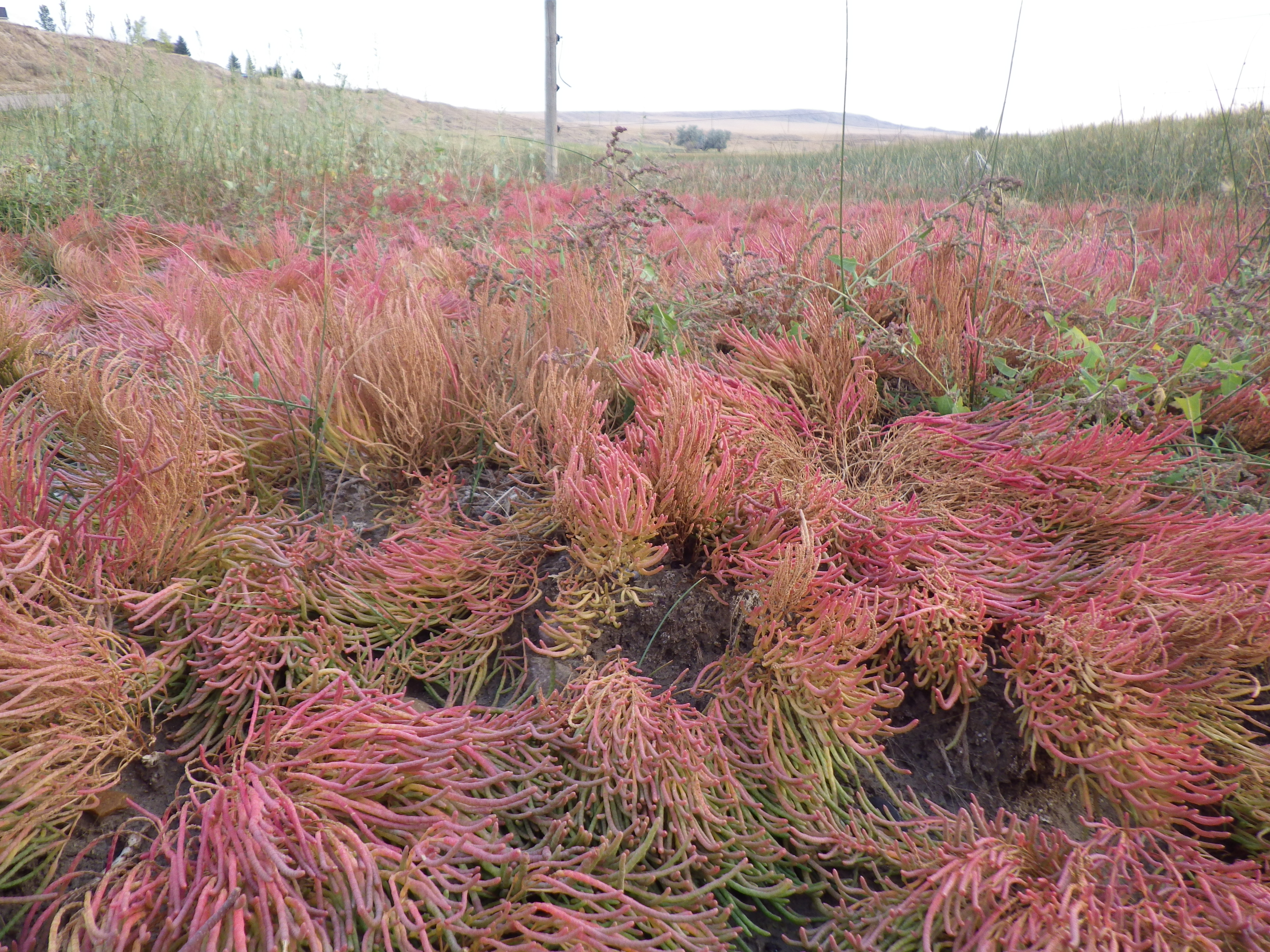
- In a saline seep in Montana

Conservation status
- Secure (NatureServe)

Scientific classification
- Kingdom: Plantae
- Clade: Tracheophytes
- Clade: Angiosperms
- Clade: Eudicots
- Order: Caryophyllales
- Family: Amaranthaceae
- Genus: Salicornia
- Species: S. rubra

Binomial name
- Salicornia rubra A.Nelson

Synonyms
- Salicornia borealis S.L.Wolff & Jefferies; Salicornia europaea var. prona (Lunell) B.Boivin; Salicornia europaea subsp. rubra (A.Nelson) Breitung; Salicornia rubra var. prona Lunell

= Salicornia rubra =

Species of flowering plant

Salicornia rubra, commonly known as the red glasswort or Rocky Mountain glasswort, is a species of flowering plant in the family Amaranthaceae. It is native to colder or higher areas of North America; the Yukon, Nunavut, British Columbia, Alberta, Saskatchewan, Manitoba, and Ontario in Canada, and the western and north-central United States. It has been introduced to Quebec and Michigan, and has gone extinct in Illinois. A halophyte, it is one of the most salt-tolerant plants of North America.
