= Salicornia oil =

Salicornia oil is a pressed oil, derived from the seeds of the Salicornia bigelovii, a halophyte (salt-loving plant) native to Mexico.

The use of salicornia as an oil crop has been championed by researcher Carl Hodges, and was the subject of a 1991 New York Times article. More recently, Hodges and his team have continued their work in Mexico, irrigating fields with sea water in farms near the Gulf of California. Salicornia seeds contain 30% oil by weight, compared to 17-20% for soybeans. The oil itself contains 72% linoleic acid, which is comparable to safflower oil.
