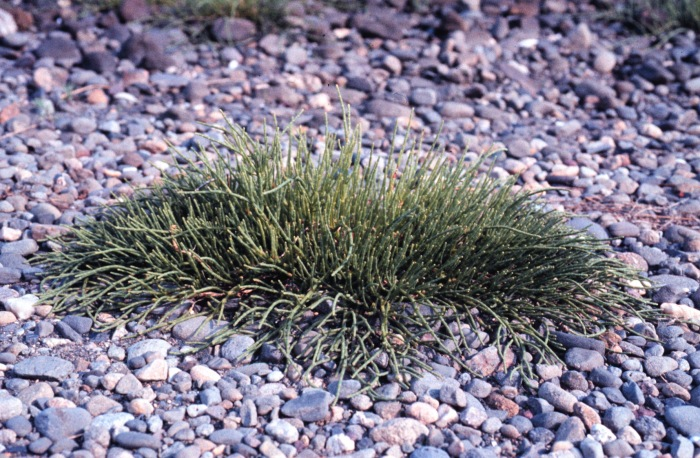

Scientific classification
- Kingdom: Plantae
- Clade: Tracheophytes
- Clade: Angiosperms
- Clade: Eudicots
- Order: Caryophyllales
- Family: Amaranthaceae
- Genus: Salicornia
- Species: S. virginica

Binomial name
- Salicornia virginica L.

= Salicornia virginica =

Species of aquatic plant

Salicornia virginica (American glasswort, pickleweed) is a halophytic perennial dicot which grows in various zones of intertidal salt marshes and can be found in alkaline flats. It is native to various regions of the Northern Hemisphere including both coasts of North America from Canada to Mexico.

The plant is one of the Salicornia species being tested as biofuel crop as its seeds are composed of 32% oil, and being a halophyte, it can be irrigated with salt water.

Salicornia virginica is classified as a obligate wetland (OBL) species which means it "occurs almost always (estimated probability 99%) under natural conditions in wetlands".
