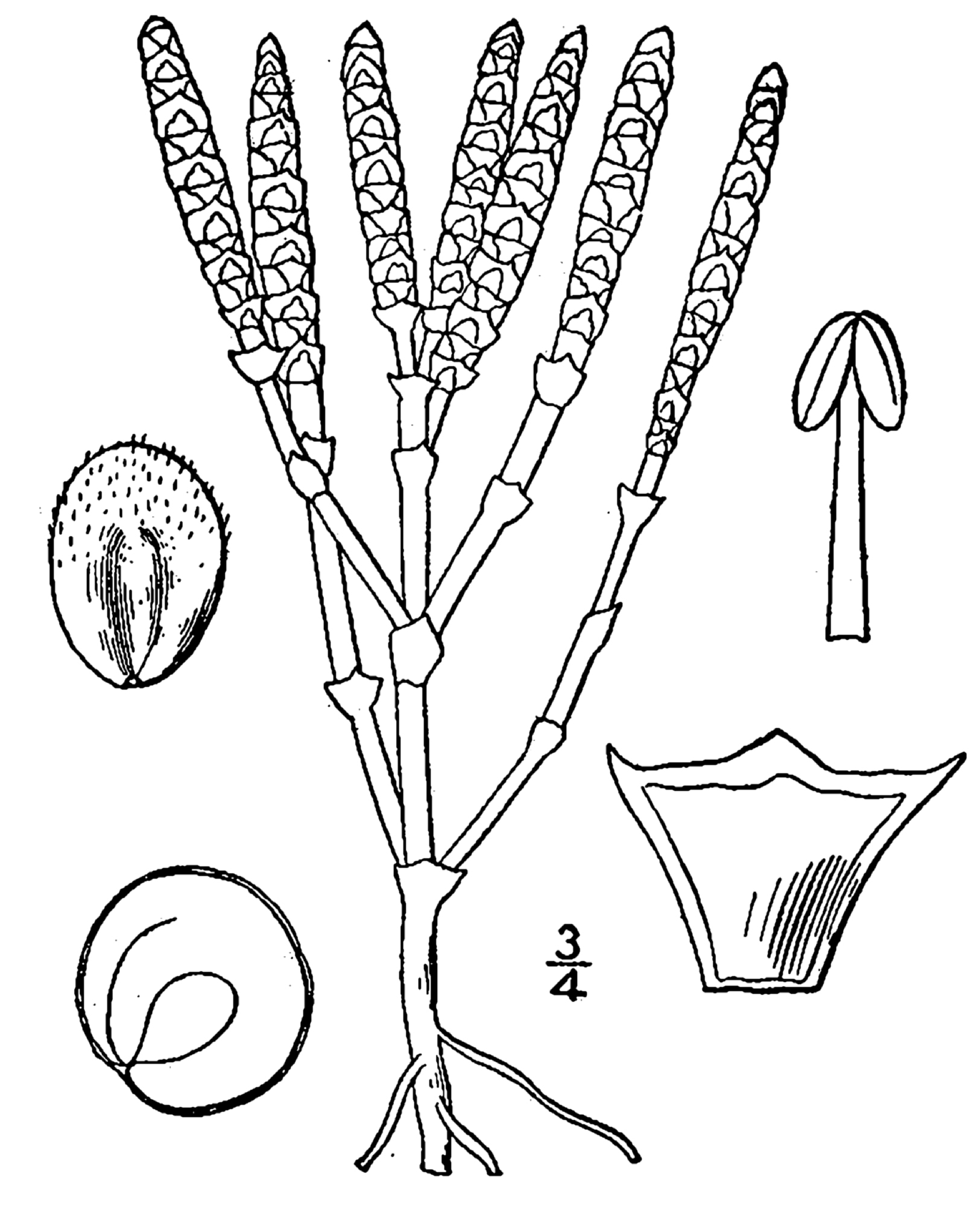
- Salicornia bigelovii

Scientific classification
- Kingdom: Plantae
- Clade: Tracheophytes
- Clade: Angiosperms
- Clade: Eudicots
- Order: Caryophyllales
- Family: Amaranthaceae
- Genus: Salicornia
- Species: S. bigelovii

Binomial name
- Salicornia bigelovii Torr.

= Salicornia bigelovii =

Species of flowering plant in the amaranth family

Salicornia bigelovii is a species of flowering plant in the family Amaranthaceae known by the common names dwarf saltwort and dwarf glasswort. It is native to coastal areas of the eastern and southern United States, Belize, and coastal Mexico (both the east and west coasts). It is a plant of salt marshes, a halophyte which grows in saltwater. It is an annual herb producing an erect, branching stem which is jointed at many internodes. The fleshy, green to red stem can reach about 60 cm in height. The leaves are usually small plates, pairs of which are fused into a band around the stem. The inflorescence is a dense, sticklike spike of flowers. Each flower is made up of a fused pocket of sepals enclosing the stamens and stigmas, and no petals. The fruit is an utricle containing tiny, fuzzy seeds. The southern part of the species range is represented by the Petenes mangroves of the Yucatán, where it is a subdominant plant associate in the mangroves.

== Uses ==
This plant is gaining scientific attention for its potential to serve as an oil crop that can be grown in desert environments and maintained with water containing high levels of salts. It is the source of salicornia oil. The seed of the plant is up to 33% oil. The oil contains up to 79% linoleic acid and is functionally similar to safflower oil. It can be used as a cooking oil and a replacement for more valuable oils in chicken feed. Domestic animals can be fed the plant as a forage. The plant could also be a source of biofuel. Salicornia has numerous health benefits and some of its bioactive metabolites have important pharmaceutical applications.

Since the plant is a halophytic coastline species which grows in saltwater, it can be irrigated with seawater, making it a potential crop for landscapes that can support few other crop plants. The plants can also be watered with high-salt drainage water, such as the effluent from farmland in California's Central Valley. Fields of the plant have been grown in wastewater from aquaculture farms in Eritrea and harvested for animal feed.
