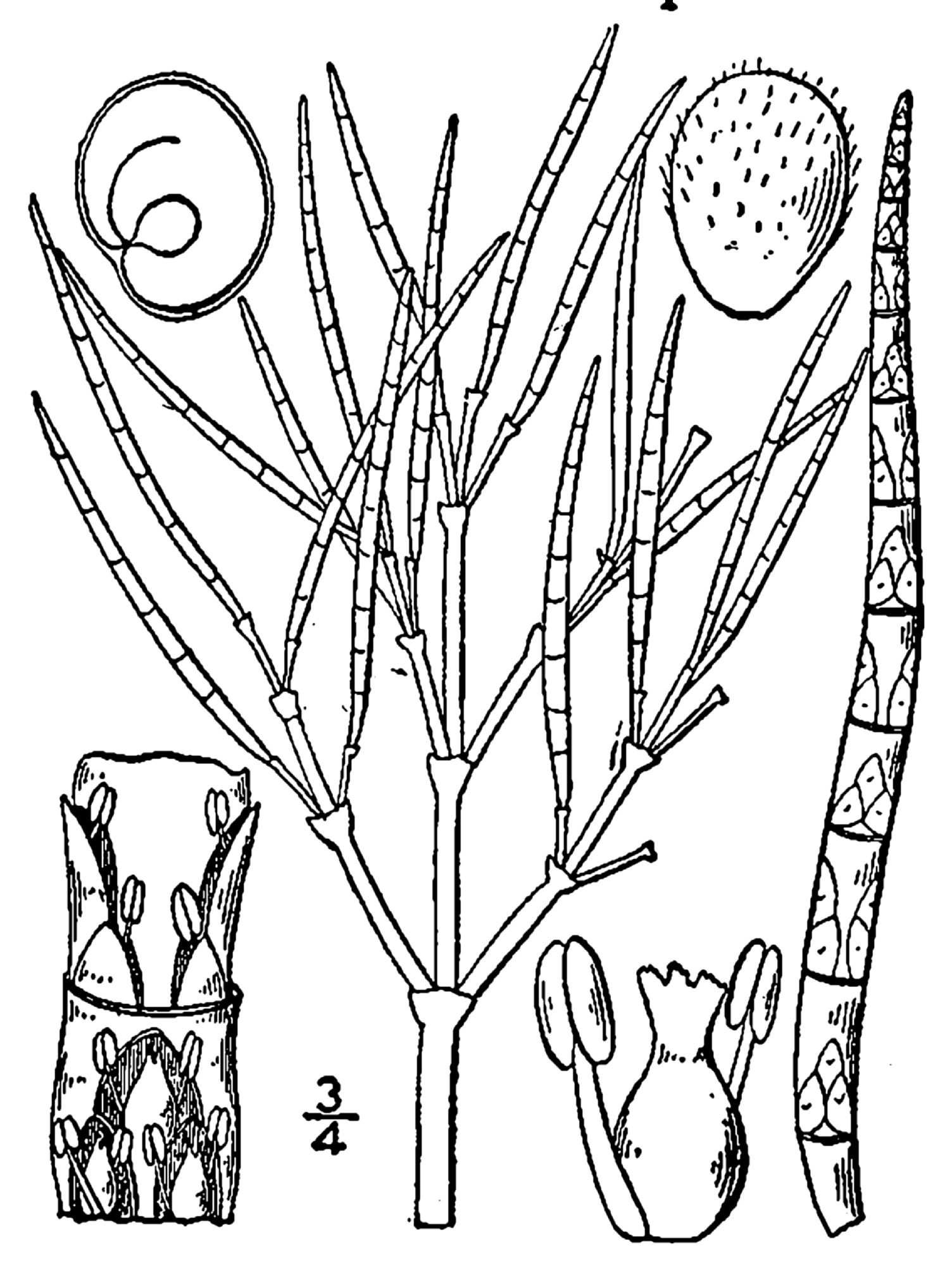
- Illustration from An Illustrated Flora of the Northern United States, Canada and the British Possessions (1913), by Nathaniel Lord Britton & Addison Brown

Scientific classification
- Kingdom: Plantae
- Clade: Tracheophytes
- Clade: Angiosperms
- Clade: Eudicots
- Order: Caryophyllales
- Family: Amaranthaceae
- Genus: Salicornia
- Species: S. maritima

Binomial name
- Salicornia maritima S.L.Wolff & Jefferies

= Salicornia maritima =

Species of succulent salt-tolerant plant

Salicornia maritima, the sea glasswort or slender glasswort, is a succulent, salt-tolerant plant found along the eastern coast of North America, including Maine and New Brunswick.

It produces flowers towards late summer or beginning of fall.

This plant is sometimes mistaken for Salicornia depressa.

== Description ==
Salicornia maritima has terminal spikes and branches that are swollen and rounded at the tips. Fertile segments grow thicker and become reddish towards the end of the year.
