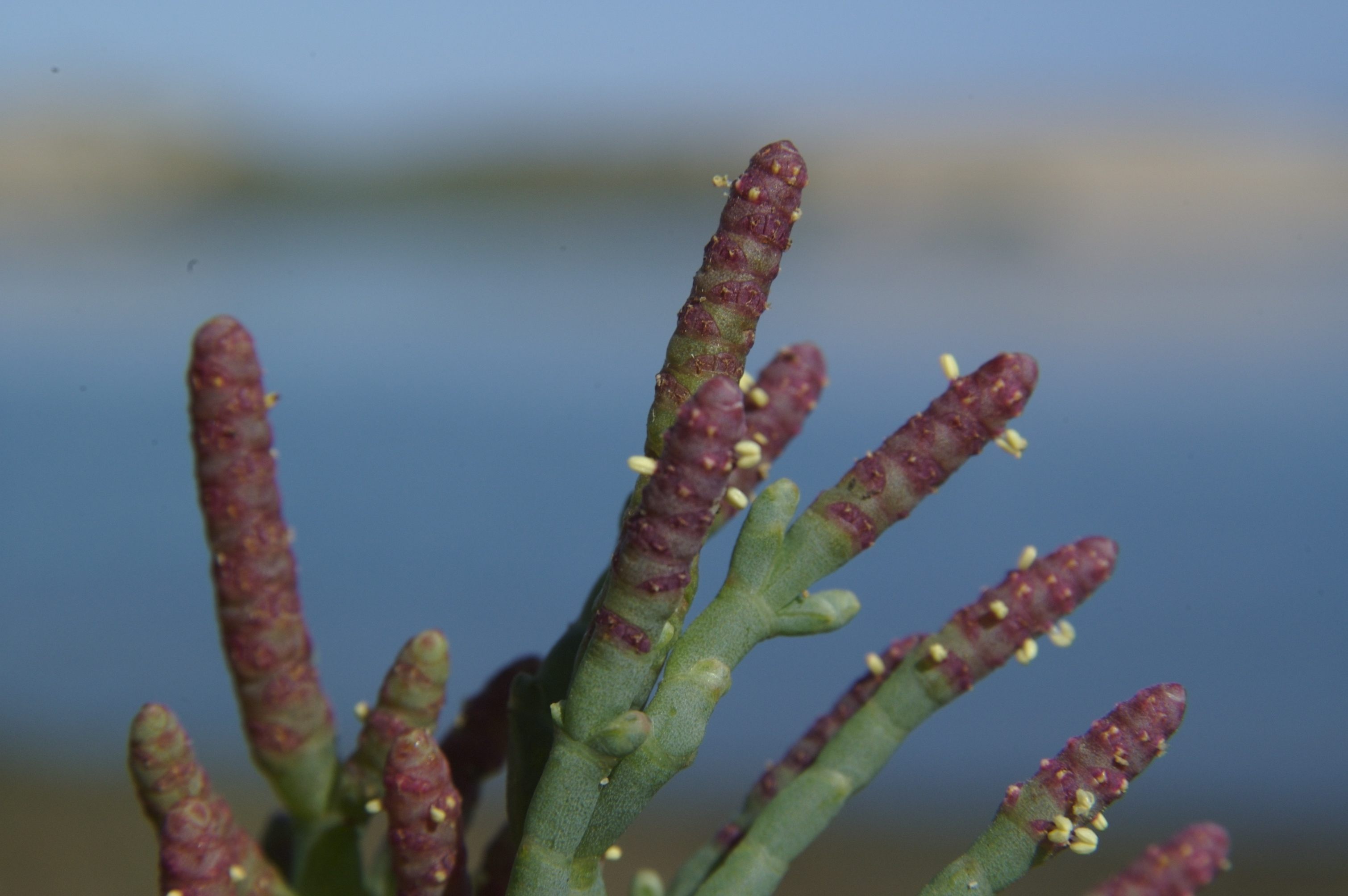

Scientific classification
- Kingdom: Plantae
- Clade: Tracheophytes
- Clade: Angiosperms
- Clade: Eudicots
- Order: Caryophyllales
- Family: Amaranthaceae
- Genus: Salicornia
- Species: S. pacifica

Binomial name
- Salicornia pacifica Standl.

Synonyms
- Sarcocornia pacifica (Standl.) A.J.Scott

= Salicornia pacifica =

Species of plant

Salicornia pacifica, also known as pickleweed, sea asparagus, Pacific swampfire, Pacific glasswort or glasswort, is a species of low-growing perennial succulent halophyte in the genus Salicornia found in the Pacific coast of North America.

== Description ==
S. pacifica grows as erect shrubs possessing a well-developed primary central root system with few or no adventitious roots. It tends to flower between July and November.

== Distribution ==
The species is native to salt marshes and alkaline soils along the Pacific coast of North America. It is occasionally found in Alaska and the East Coast. It occurs below 100 meters (330 feet) elevation. The genus is distributed globally.

== Ecology ==
Pickleweed is specially adapted to use saltwater as its main source of water. When the saltwater is taken up, the salt is removed and stored in specialized vacuoles in the terminal segments. As the vacuoles become full of brine, they turn red and drop off the plant, removing the salt. Although pickleweed can withstand short periods of flooding, it will die under prolonged immersion, as when the estuary mouth closes and the salt marsh floods.

Pickleweed is an important nesting habitat for migrating birds. It is also an important food source for the endangered salt marsh harvest mouse.

== Uses ==
Pickleweed is edible and has a salty flavor.

== Gallery ==
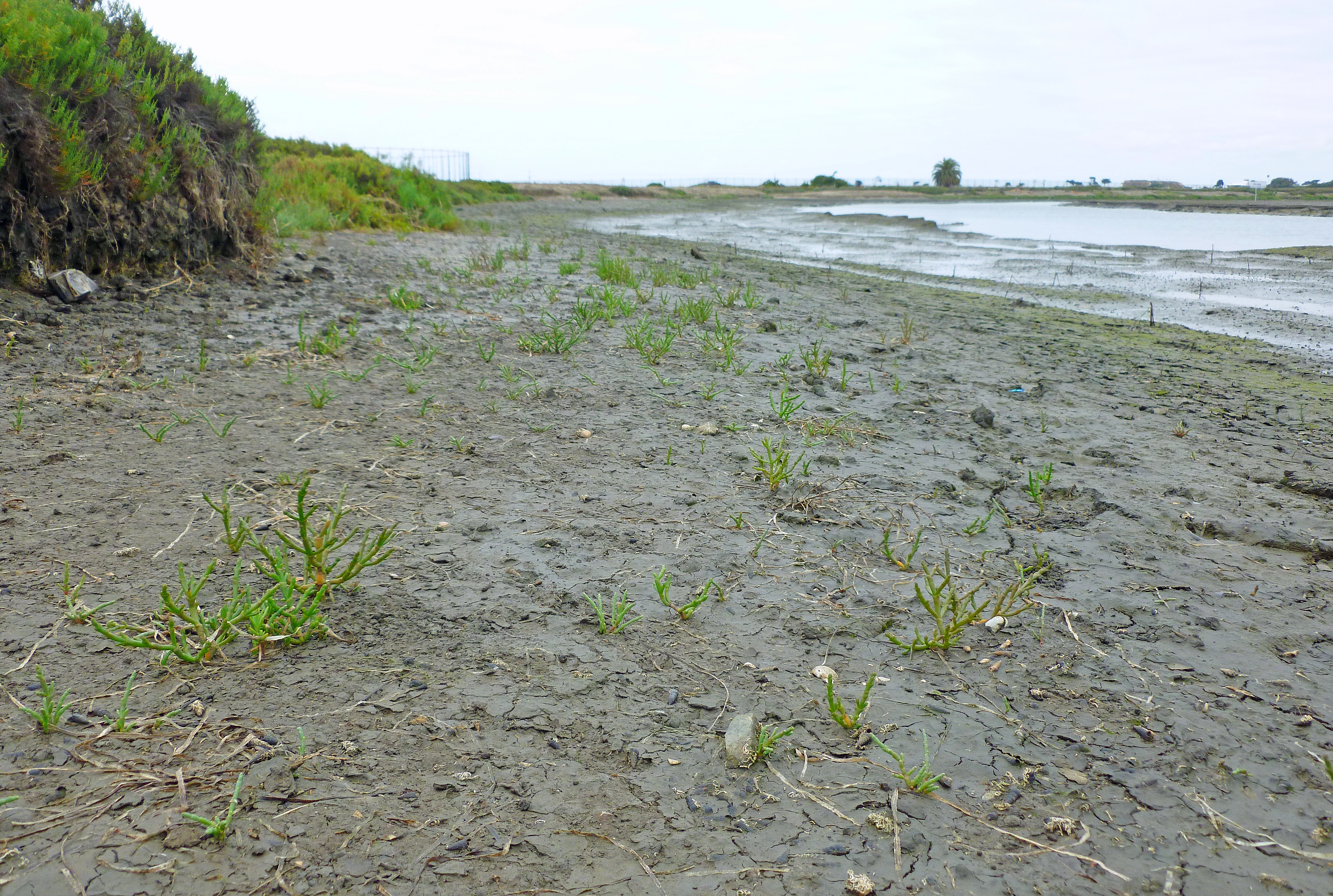
Growing on a salt pond shore

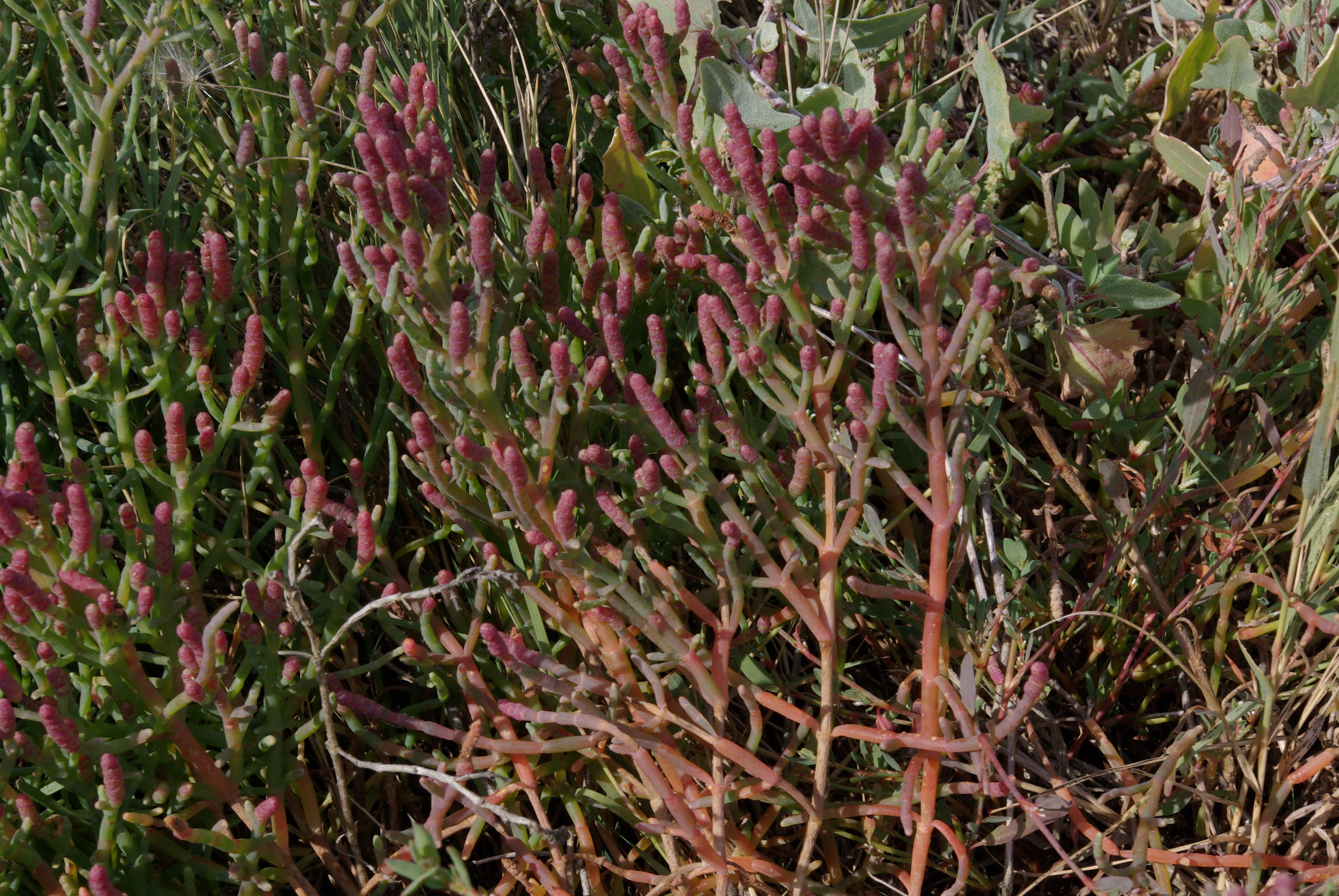
Growing in Parksville, British Columbia

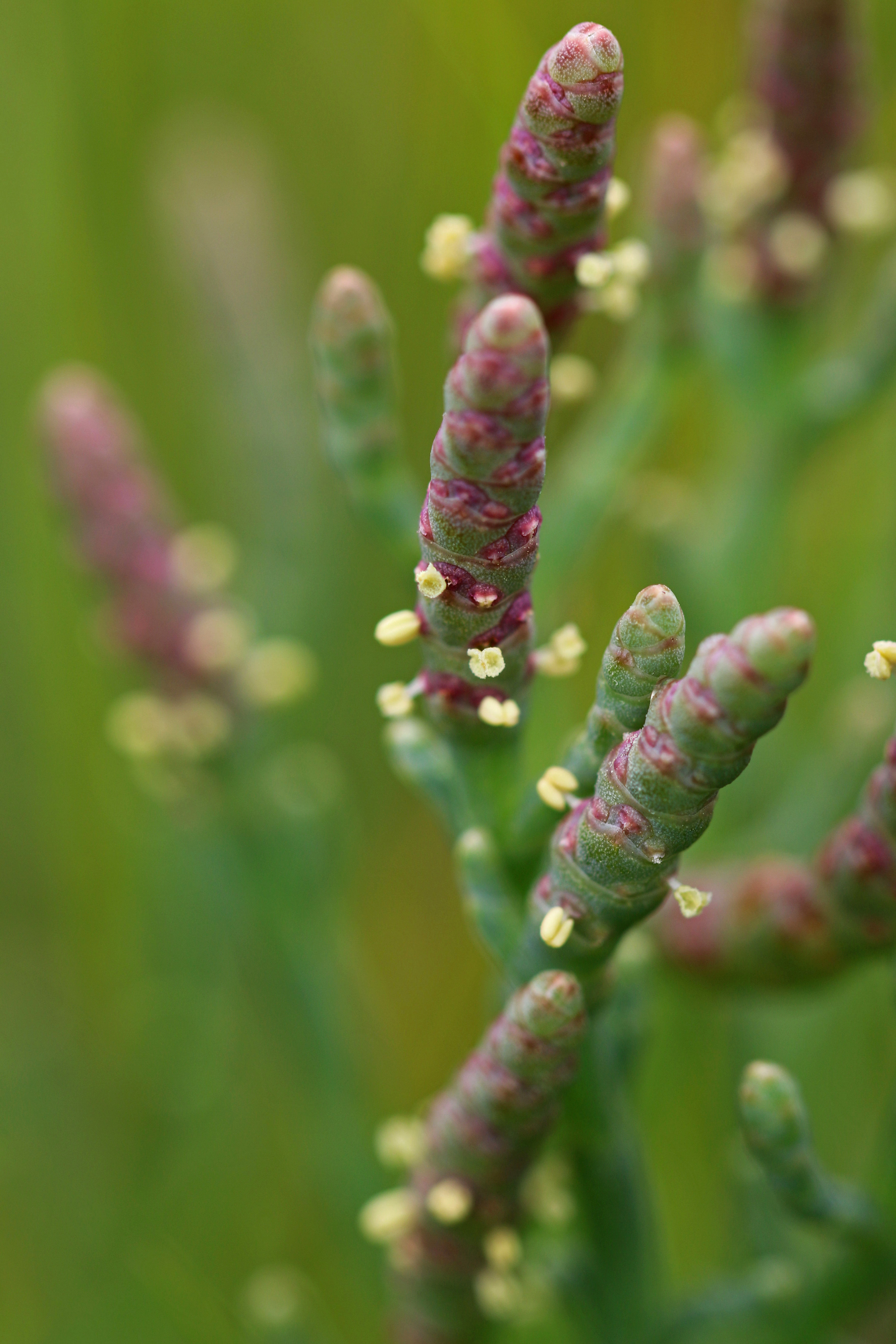
Close-up

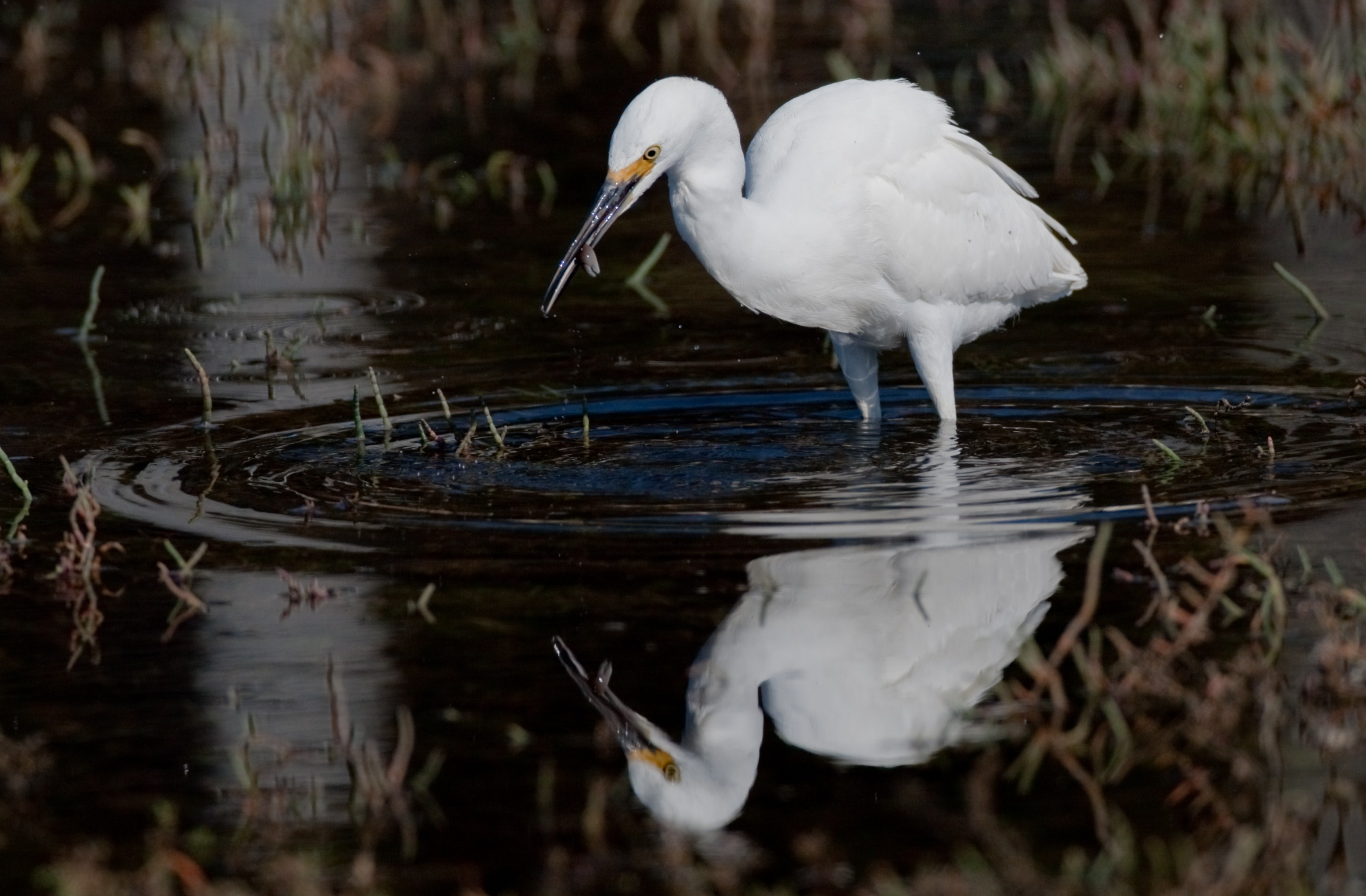
Snowy egret clamps a crab amongst pickleweed in California

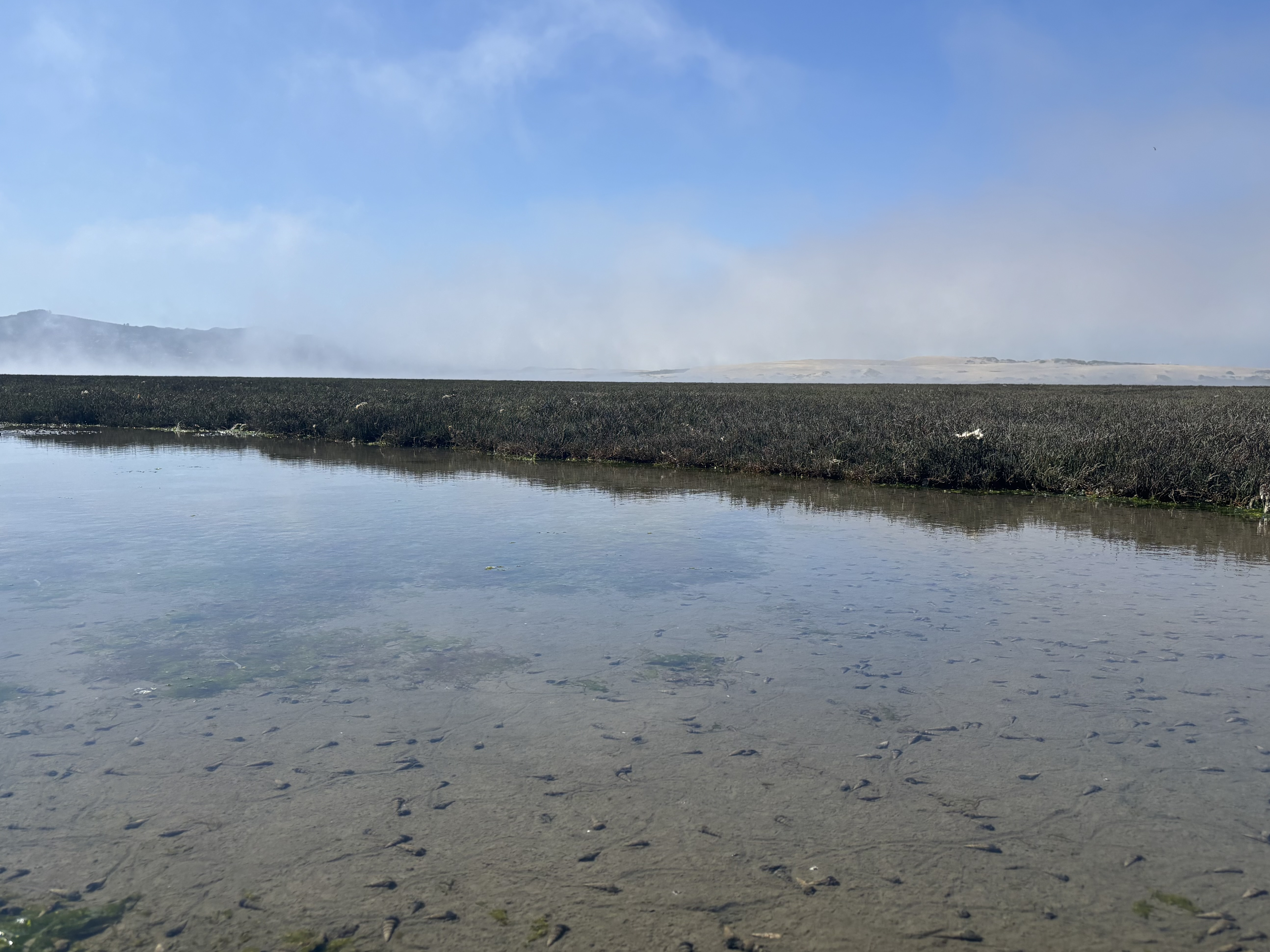
Surrounding a salt pond on Wednesday Island in Morro Bay, CA
