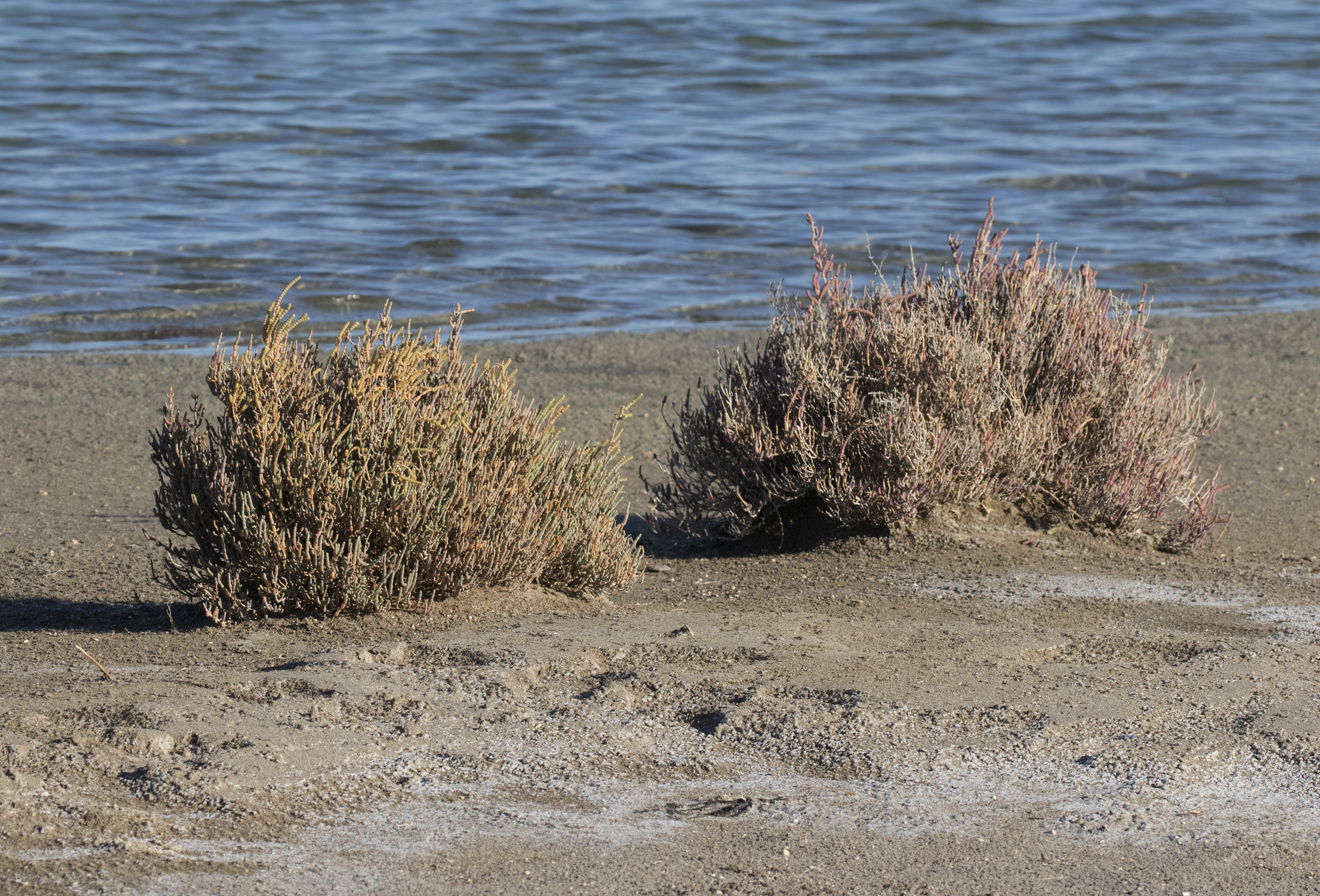

Scientific classification
- Kingdom: Plantae
- Clade: Embryophytes
- Clade: Tracheophytes
- Clade: Angiosperms
- Clade: Eudicots
- Order: Caryophyllales
- Family: Amaranthaceae
- Genus: Salicornia
- Species: S. perennis

Binomial name
- Salicornia perennis Mill.

Synonyms
- Arthrocnemum ambiguum (Michx.) Moq.; Arthrocnemum fruticosum var. radicans (Sm.) Moq.; Arthrocnemum perenne (Mill.) Fourc.; Arthrocnemum variiflorum Moss; Salicornia lignosa J.Woods; Salicornia longispicata A.Chev.; Salicornia radicans Sm.; Salicornia sarmentosa Duval-Jouve; Sarcathria ambigua Raf.; Sarcathria radicans (Sm.) Raf.; Sarcocornia perennis (Mill.) A.J.Scott; Sarcocornia perennis var. lignosa (J.Woods) O'Call.

= Salicornia perennis =

Species of flowering plant

Salicornia perennis, synonym Sarcocornia perennis, otherwise known as perennial glasswort, is a species of halophytic perennial plant within the family Amaranthaceae. It has a widespread but patchy native distribution, being found in parts of Western Europe, northern and southern Africa, North America from southeast Alaska to south Mexico, the Caribbean, and South America. It is native to the coasts of southern Britain and Ireland, where it is classified as nationally scarce. The species flowers between July and October.
