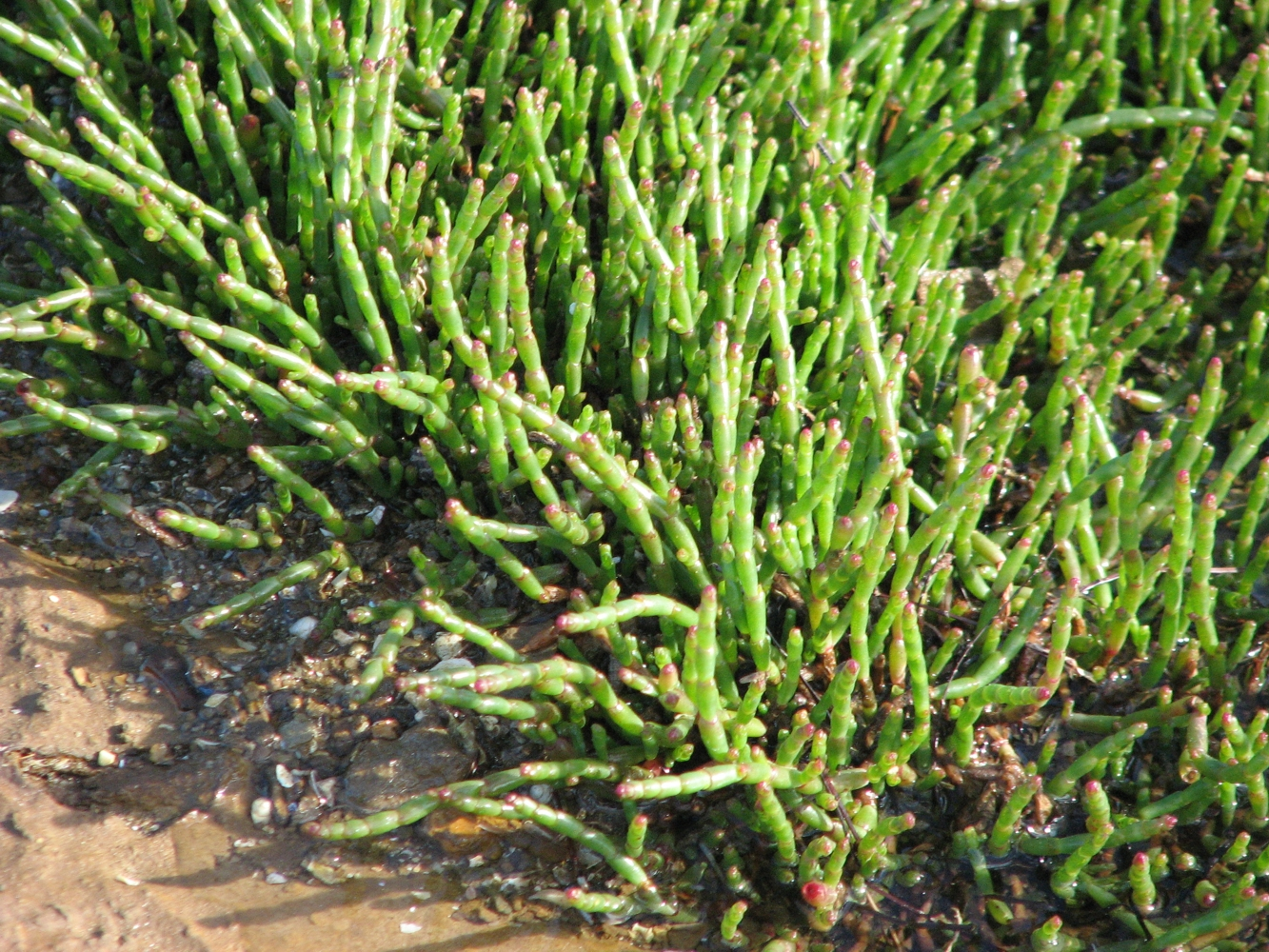
- At Ricketts Point Marine Sanctuary
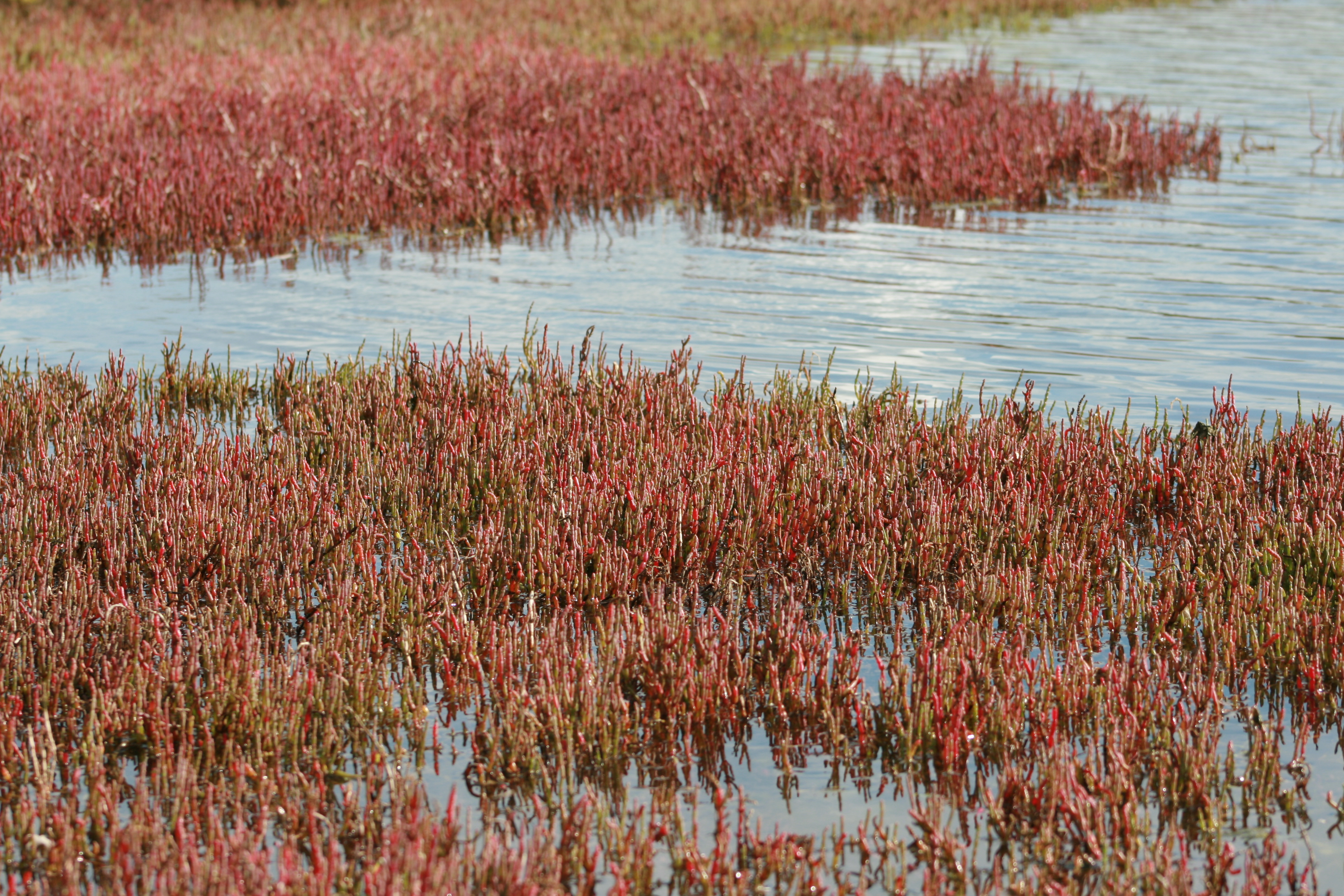
- at Sydney Olympic Park

Scientific classification
- Kingdom: Plantae
- Clade: Tracheophytes
- Clade: Angiosperms
- Clade: Eudicots
- Order: Caryophyllales
- Family: Amaranthaceae
- Genus: Salicornia
- Species: S. quinqueflora

Binomial name
- Salicornia quinqueflora Bunge ex Ung.-Sternb.

Subspecies
- S. quinqueflora subsp. quinqueflora; S. quinqueflora subsp. tasmanica (Paul G.Wilson) Piirainen & G.Kadereit

Synonyms
- Sarcocornia quinqueflora (Bunge ex Ung.-Sternb.) A.J.Scott

= Salicornia quinqueflora =

Beaded glasswort

Species of plant

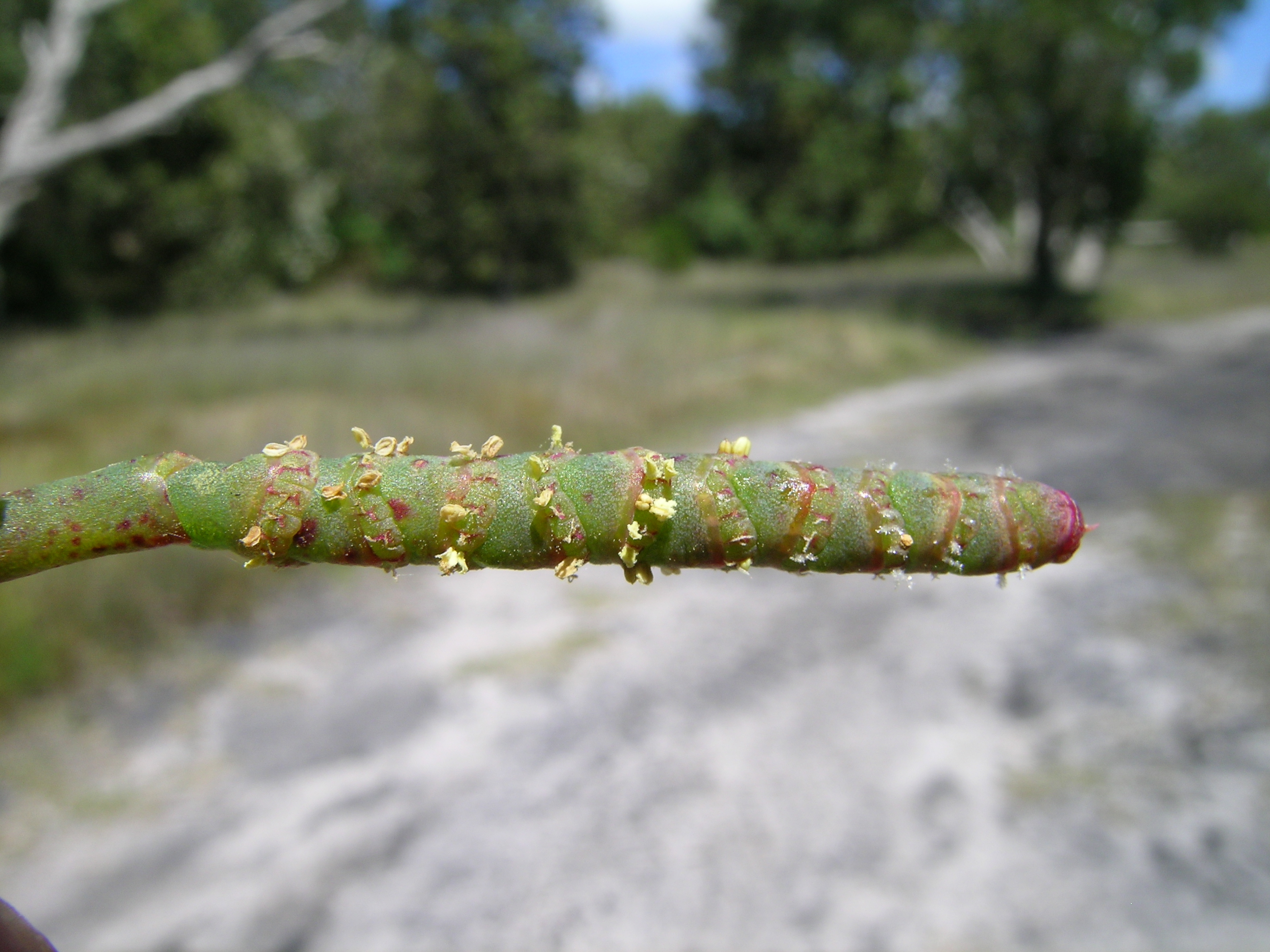
Flowering

Salicornia quinqueflora, synonym Sarcocornia quinqueflora, commonly known as beaded samphire, bead weed, beaded glasswort or glasswort, is a species of succulent halophytic coastal shrub. It occurs in wetter coastal areas of Australia and New Zealand.

Historically, people used to burn glassworts to collect the ashes. The ashes contained a high amount of soda in them, which was used to make soap and glass. This is thought to be how glasswort received its name.

== Description ==
Beaded glasswort, Salicornia quinqueflora, is a species of succulent, salt tolerant plant. It grows as a small shrub, with a lifecycle of several years – which is also known as a perennial lifecycle. They are normally found near salt water bodies (along the coast or estuaries) and grow in a mat form along the ground. The stems are jointed and fleshy when young, but they dry out and appear woody when ageing. The young, fleshy stems are grey or green with sometimes red colouring along the tips. The leaves grow opposite to each other and are connected at the base. They grow on small bumpy petioles – which is the part of a stalk that attaches the leaf to the stem. The leaves then extend down the stem – which in turn, forms the noticeable joints. The leaves look like tiny blades, wrapped around the stem. This formation of the leaves gives the stems a ‘beaded’ look. Growing at the end of the stem, the inflorescences (another name for clusters of flowers) are spikey, and made up of small segments with large cymes. Cymes are a group of flowers with a central stem that matures before the others. Each cyme usually has three flowers entirely immersed in the fleshy part of the joint. The unisex or bisexual flowers are nearly always identical in size and grow in an outwardly symmetrical style along the stems. The flowers have three to four fleshy exterior parts that connect to the apex (highest part of the stem), one or two stamens (the pollen-producing reproductive organ) and an ovary with two or three parts that hold the pollen (the stigma). There is a lot of fruit found in the outer part of the flower, and the fruit wall has a membrane. The seeds are vertical and spherical in shape, light brown, hairy and also have a membrane on the exterior. The hairs take on many forms – they can be angular, slight, curved, conic or straight. There is no feeding tissue (also known as the perisperm) within the seed.

=== Reproduction and life cycle ===
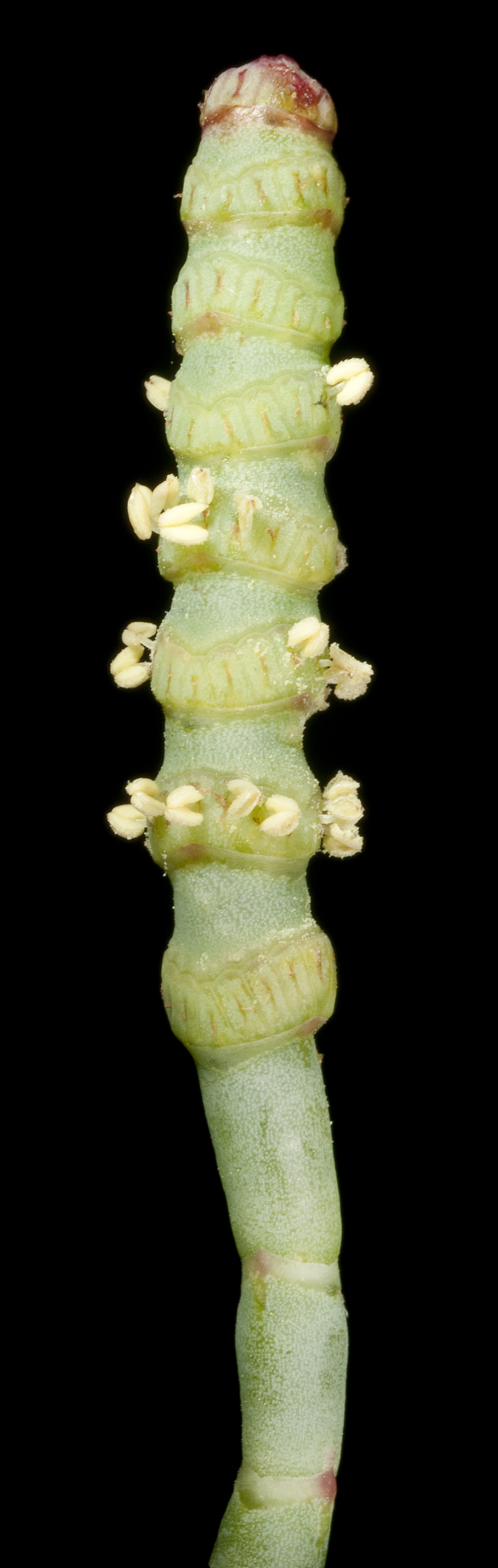
Male flowers

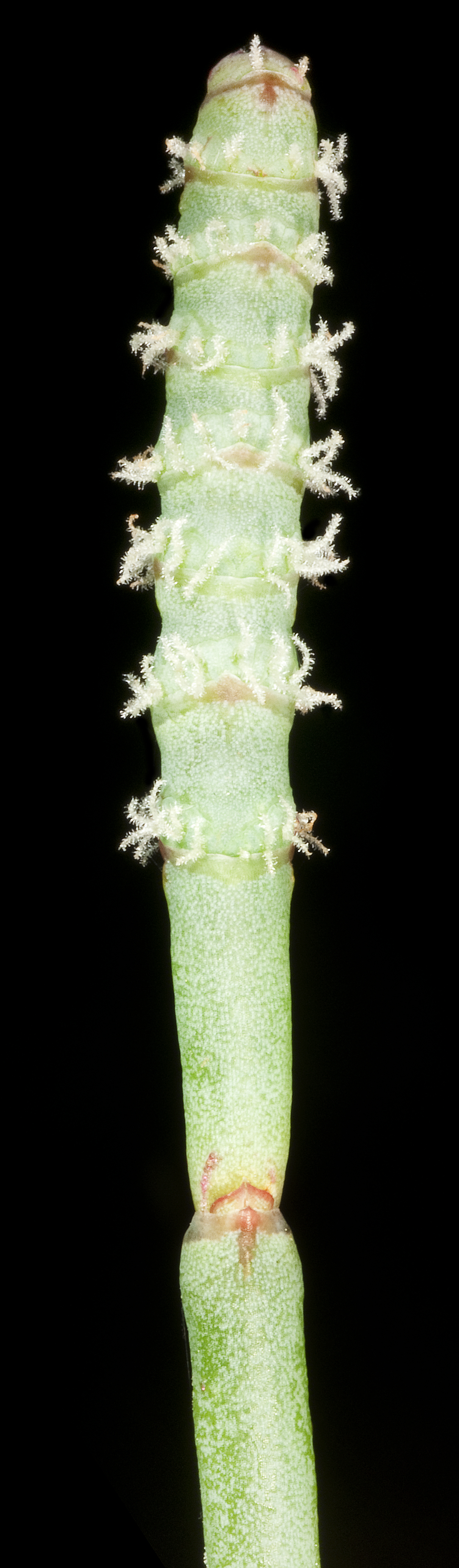
Female flowers

Glassworts are perennials, meaning that they go through many reproductive cycles and they do not necessarily need to produce genetically unique seeds all the time. For this reason, they often use ramets to propagate clonally. They make genetically identical copies of the healthiest organisms to spread quickly and asexually. When growth is strong and the environment is right, glassworts will produce genets, a genetically unique individual through seeds in order to keep the population diverse and evolving. Ranets often remain connected to the parent plant in order to survive in harsh conditions until they are fully developed and do not have enough nutrients and water to survive on their own. Seeds generally germinate during the early spring when temperatures begin to warm.

=== Flowers ===
Salicornia quinqueflora is characterized as gynodioecious, meaning that there are populations containing only hermaphrodite plants as well as populations containing both female and hermaphrodite plants. Most populations are entirely hermaphrodite except for the coasts of Nelson & Foxton, Tasman Bays, and the central regions of Otago in New Zealand. For the hermaphrodite flowers, they are protogynous. This means that the female stigma matures before the male anther to prevent self-fertilization. For these hermaphrodites, the stigma protrudes 1–2 days before the anther, and the stigma are then visible for 4–6 days. Anthers are revealed individually, one at a time. Anthers open up in the early morning to release pollen. This pollen is then distributed by wind. The flowers produce no nectar and are generally not pollinated by insects. Although, introduced honeybee, Apis mellifera, has been recorded visiting the flowers of the plant and collecting pollen on parts of its body, so this species is thought to possibly help spread pollen. For the female flowers, the stigma protrudes at the same time as the anthers of the hermaphrodite plants. This allows the pollen from the hermaphrodite plants to fertilize the female plants, and the life cycle can begin.

== Taxonomy ==
It was first published as Salicornia quinqueflora in 1866, but transferred into Sarcocornia when that genus was erected in 1977. The Maori name is ureure. Molecular phylogenetic studies showed that when Salicornia and Sarcocornia are separated, Sarcocornia is paraphyletic, since Salicornia evolved within Sarcocornia. A study in 2017 confirmed the paraphyly of Sarcocornia, and merged the genus into Salicornia. This placement is accepted by sources such as Plants of the World Online and the New Zealand Plant Conservation Network.

== Distribution and habitat ==
=== Natural global habitat ===
Salicornia quinqueflora is not endemic to New Zealand. In New Zealand it is found mostly on the shoreline in regions throughout the North Island. In the South Island S. quinqueflora is widespread on the east coast, but isn't found on the west coast. In Australia it occurs on the south west and south east areas, and also in parts of the Nullarbor Plain, and part of the east coast of Cape York Peninsula.

=== New Zealand range ===
In New Zealand, the species is found in mainly coastal areas. It can be found on all islands of New Zealand – including Stewart and the Chatham Islands. Glasswort grows on both coasts of the North Island and down the east coast of the South Island. Interestingly, it is also found in Central Otago, in two locations, roughly 70 km inland.

=== Habitat preferences ===
The preferred habitat of Salicornia quinqueflora is anywhere where salty water tends to be – so along coastlines, salt marshes, sandy beaches and rocky areas. It grows below and above the high tide mark along the coasts.

=== Soil preferences ===
The species is a halophyte, so it prefers soils with high salinities. This is the main factor determining its success. It is typically found in areas with high moisture levels because of the high salinity of the soils near coastlines; however, glassworts are tolerable to a wide range of soil moistures. They can handle areas with completely dry soil and soils that are completely water logged. Salicornia quinqueflora has a healthy population in Otago, where it is extremely dry and arid. It also has a large population on the extremely wet coastlines of Nelson.

=== Environmental preferences ===
Like other halophytes, Salicornia quinqueflora can handle a wide range of temperatures and are evolved to handle sudden environmental changes. Producing offspring through clonal reproduction allows them to survive in conditions that are less than ideal. The preferred climate type is warm-temperate and subtropical regions, where they can easily reproduce through seeds to keep populations genetically stable.

== Threats and predators ==
=== Invasive species ===
The introduction of invasive species into the endemic regions for beaded glasswort are a major cause of habitat loss. Non-native species tend to grow quicker and faster than the native glasswort, allowing them to easily overtake their habitats. One example of this is in Victoria, Australia where Invasive Cordgrass (Spartina spp.) has changed the makeup of the intertidal sediment flats. The introduction of cordgrass caused these habitats to transform into marshlands. The previous intertidal habitat was important for the survival of the glasswort species, so the transition to marshland left the native glasswort without its habitat.

=== Glasswort gall mite ===
The glasswort gall mite, Aceria rubifaciens, was discovered in Auckland in 1948 and rediscovered in 2013 in an estuary near the Firth of Thames. This tiny, endemic mite only feeds on the glasswort, which the feeding causes pocket galls on the fresh, young stems. The mites live inside the galls which offer them protection from larger predators and weather conditions.

There is not a lot known about these tiny mites, mainly because they have only been found on Salicornia quinqueflora. So far it has only been found in the North Island, but it can be assumed that it would affect the other populations throughout New Zealand.

=== Other predators ===
Glasswort is also edible and palatable, so is known to have been consumed by both animals and humans. It could then be argued that both animals and humans are also considered predators of glasswort.

== Other information ==
=== Habitat in inland Otago ===
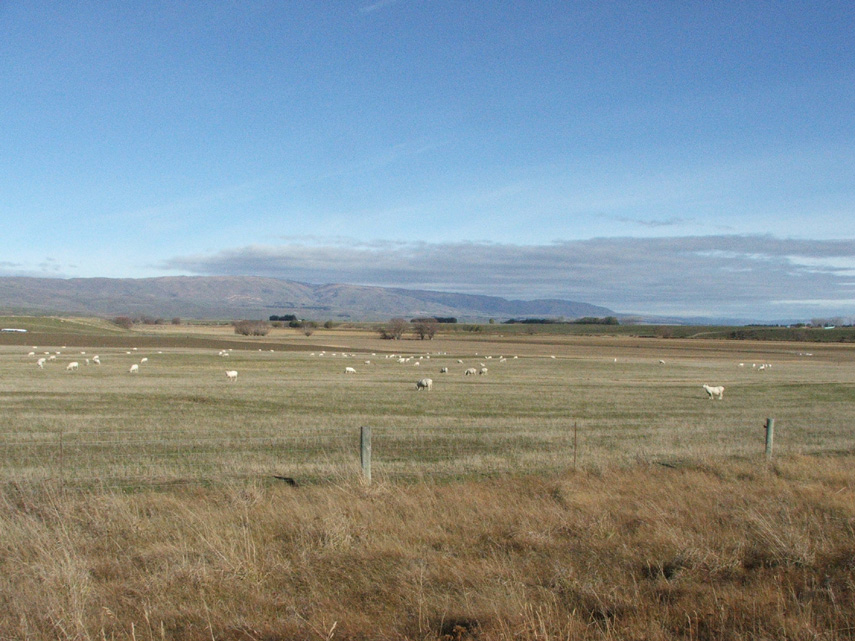
Maniototo Plain as unusual inland habitat for Glasswort

Salicornia quinqueflora has been found growing in inland regions of Central Otago, the Maniototo Plain. This is odd because of its liking for salty soils near coastal areas. The Maniototo plain has developed highly saline soils due to the extreme dryness of the area. As rocks erode, the soil became more and more salty, and there was not enough rain to wash the salt away. This left the soil salty enough to support the glasswort. As the seeds were transported into the area by birds, the plant began to grow in the inland region.

=== Food Source for orange-bellied parrot ===
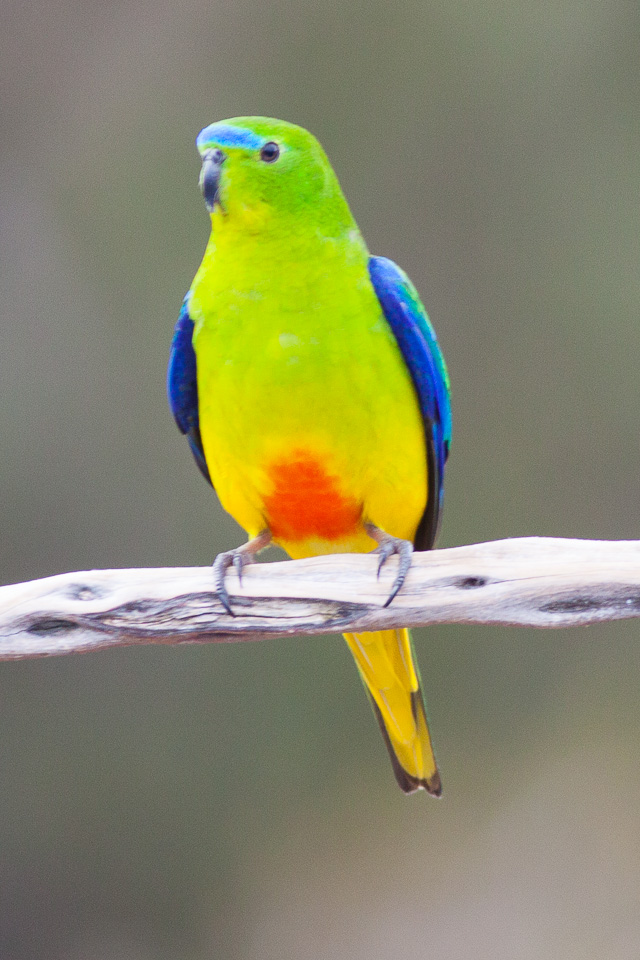
The orange-bellied parrot of Australia relies heavily on glasswort as its main source of food.

One species known to rely heavily on the glasswort is the orange-bellied parrot (Neophema chrysogaster). This parrot is critically endangered, having only around 180 individuals left in the wild. This native Australian bird feeds primarily on the seeds of Salicornia quinqueflora. As habitats for the glasswort decline due to human development, it becomes harder for the parrot to find the amount of seeds it needs to survive.
