= Lagunas de Mejía National Sanctuary =

Protected area in Peru

- Santuario Nacional Lagunas de Mejía
- IUCN category III (natural monument or feature)
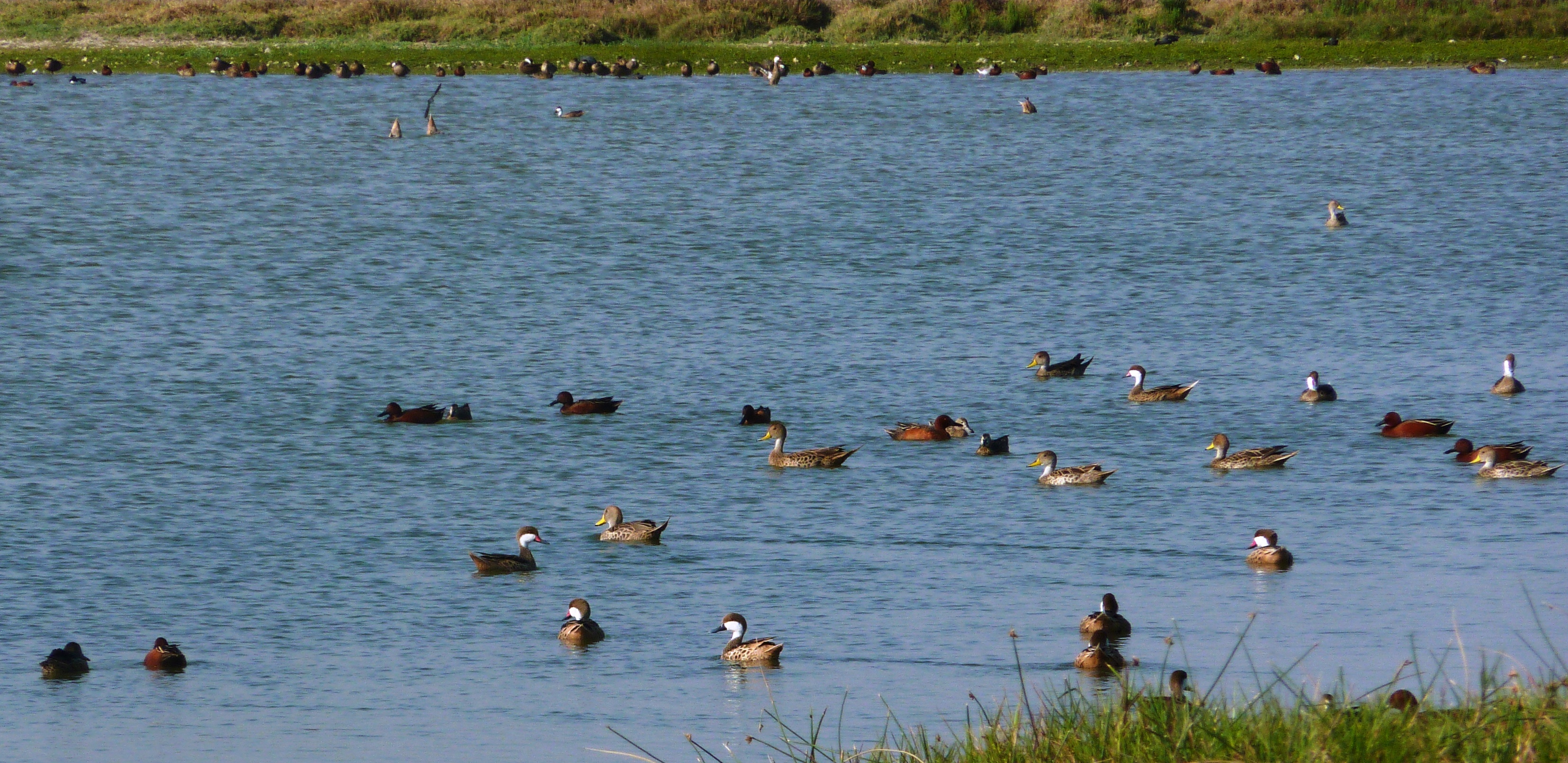

- Location within Peru
- Location: Peru; Mejía, Arequipa
- Coordinates: 17°08′49″S 71°51′47″W
- Area: 690.6 hectares (1,707 acres)
- Established: 1984
- Governing body: SERNANP
- Website: Santuario Nacional Lagunas de Mejía

Ramsar Wetland
- Official name: Santuario Nacional Lagunas de Mejía
- Designated: 30 March 1992
- Reference no.: 547

Lagunas de Mejía National Sanctuary (Santuario Nacional Lagunas de Mejía) is a protected area on the coastal plain of Peru, in Islay Province, Arequipa, in the mouth of the Tambo River. It is a sanctuary for migratory and resident birds, and was designated a Ramsar site in 1992.

== History ==
In 1981, the Mejia Lagoons were being drained by the Peruvian Ministry of Agriculture to convert the land to ricefields. A letter-writing campaign to the Peruvian government in protest, made by O.P. Pearson, M.P. Harris and R.A. Hughes among others, resulted in the declaration of the lagoons as a wildlife sanctuary for birds. The sanctuary was established on February 24 1984, covering an area of 690.6 hectares (1,707 acres) with the aim to protect local flora and fauna as well as to attract tourists.

== Geography ==
The sanctuary is located on the southern coast of Peru, in the region of Arequipa, and belongs to the districts of Mejía and Dean Valdivia. It has a maximum elevation of 3.5 m above sea level, and comprises a series of lagoons, wetlands and part of the mouth of the Tambo River.

== Ecology ==
=== Flora ===
A total of 48 species of vascular plants and 17 species of algae have been found in the sanctuary. In freshwater ecosystems trees like pájaro bobo (Tessaria integrifolia) and sauce (Salix humboldtiana); shrubs like callacasa (Baccharis salicifolia) and chilca (Baccharis glutinosa); and some herb species can be found. Marshes are dominated by species like totora (Typha sp.) and junco (Schoenoplectus americanus), while grama dulce (Paspalum vaginatum) can be found on the shores. On more saline habitats grama salada (Distichlis spicata) and verdolaguilla (Sarcocornia sp.) can be predominant.

=== Fauna ===
One of the purposes of this protected area is to provide a sanctuary for Nearctic migratory birds, as it is a unique habitat on almost 2000 km of coast on the Pacific Ocean. A total of 200 species of resident and migratory birds can be found in the park including: the grey gull, the sanderling, the Black skimmer, Belcher's gull, the kelp gull, the Grey-headed gull, the White-tufted grebe, the Great grebe, the White-cheeked pintail, the Cinnamon teal, the Common moorhen, the Virginia rail, the Cocoi heron, the Snowy egret, the Little blue heron, the Chilean flamingo, among others.

Some of the mammals reported in the area are: Molina's hog-nosed skunk, the lesser grison, the Sechuran fox, the marine otter, Pallas's long-tongued bat, and the montane guinea pig.

The aquatic ecosystems harbor species of fish like monengue (Dormitator latifrons), lisa (Mugil cephalus) and pejerrey (Basilichthys sp.); and crustaceans like Cryphiops caementarius and Ocypode gaudichaudii.

Amphibians like Rhinella limensis and reptiles like the endemic tiger Pacific iguana and Phyllodactylus sp. also inhabit the sanctuary.

== Activities ==
Birdwatching and hiking can be done in the area.

== Environmental issues ==
The pumping of underground water and deviation of waters from the lagoons; disposal of agrochemical waste; illegal hunting, fishing and wood extraction; uncontrolled extraction of reeds; and the impact of beachgoers from nearby towns are the main environmental problems that affect this protected area.

A study showed degradation in 97.93 hectares of the sanctuary due to limited management, which resulted in decreased biodiversity, especially birds. The study recommends that hydrological connectivity must be restored in order for the sanctuary to keep providing important environmental services.
