= Máximo Carrasco =

Peruvian footballer and manager

Personal information
- Full name: Máximo Carrasco Meza
- Place of birth: Cocachacra, Peru
- Date of death: 5 November 1990
- Place of death: Islay province, Peru

Senior career*
| Years | Team | Apps | (Gls) |
- FBC Piérola

Managerial career
- 1979: FBC Melgar
- 1979–1980: Alfonso Ugarte (Puno)
- 1980: CNI
- 1981–1982: FBC Melgar
- 1982: Coronel Bolognesi
- 1983: CNI
- 1984: Diablos Rojos (Juliaca)
- 1984–1985: FBC Melgar
- 1986: Alfonso Ugarte (Puno)
- 1987: FBC Melgar
- 1997–1988: Deportivo Municipal
- 1989: FBC Aurora
- 1990: Internazionale San Borja
- 1990: FBC Aurora
- * Club domestic league appearances and goals

Máximo Carrasco Meza (died on 5 November 1990) was a Peruvian football player and manager.

== Biography ==
Initially a footballer with FBC Piérola of Arequipa, then a physical education teacher, Máximo Carrasco began his coaching career with FBC Melgar (Arequipa) in 1979. He would manage the club several times in the 1980s, leading them to the national championship in 1981. He thus became the first coach to win the Peruvian league title with a club outside the Lima region.

He had the opportunity to manage numerous provincial clubs, including Alfonso Ugarte (Puno), CNI (Iquitos), Coronel Bolognesi (Tacna) and Diablos Rojos (Juliaca). In 1987, he embarked on his first coaching experience with a club in the capital, Deportivo Municipal.

Coach of FBC Aurora (Arequipa), he died on 5 November 1990 in a road accident near Mollendo. As a tribute, one of the 16 football stadiums in the district of Paucarpata (province of Arequipa) bears his name: the Estadio Máximo Carrasco Meza.

== Honours ==
=== Manager ===
FBC Melgar

- Torneo Descentralizado: 1981
