= BAP Mollendo =

BAP Mollendo is the name of the following ships of the Peruvian Navy, named for the town of Mollendo:

- BAP Mollendo (ATP-151), an oiler launched in 1962, in service 1967–1978
- BAP Mollendo (ATC-131), a transport commissioned in 1972
