= BAP Mollendo (ATC-131) =

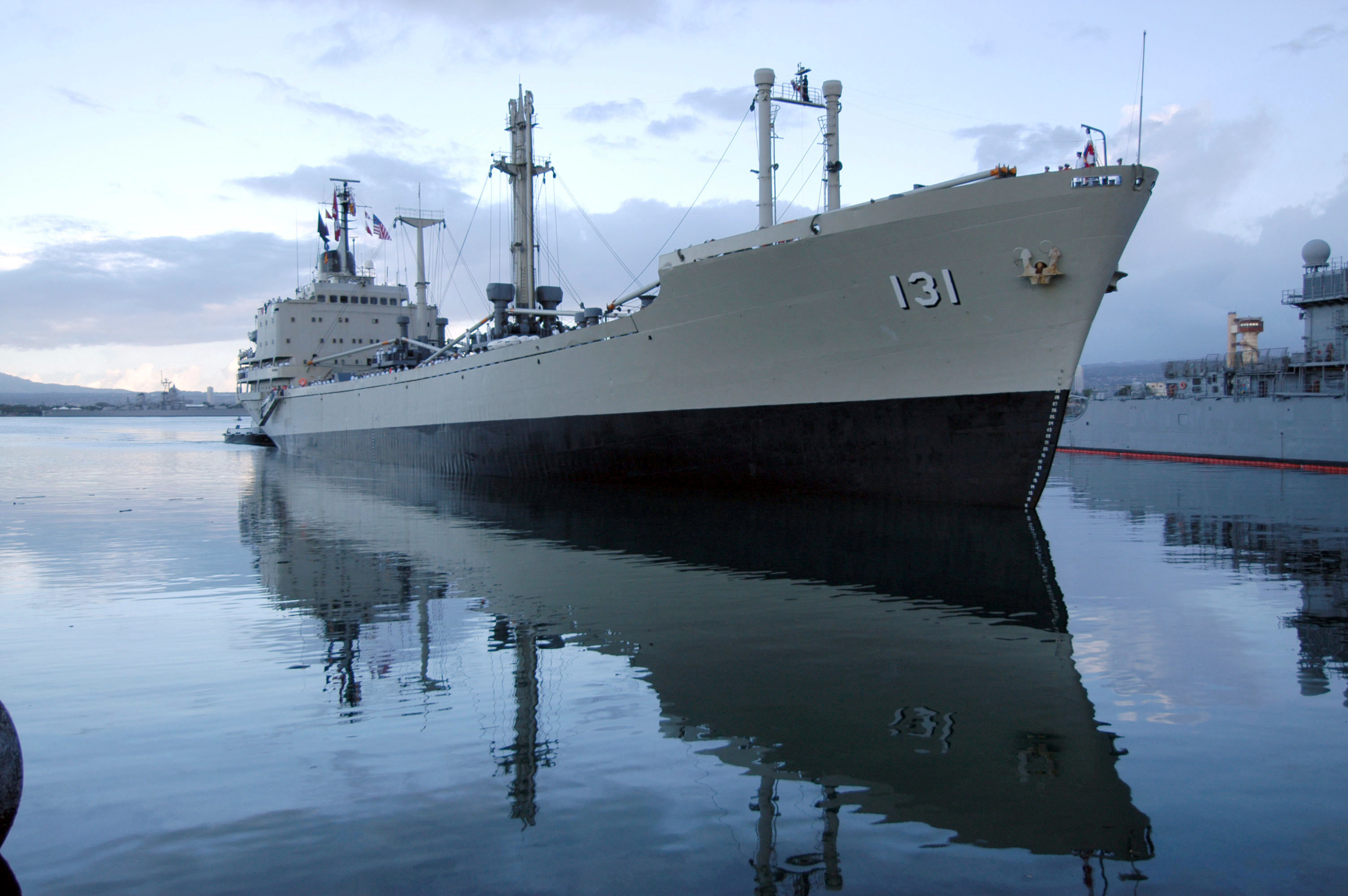
- BAP Mollendo (ATC-131)

History

Peru
- Builder: Servicio Industrial de Marina--Sima
- Launched: 15 July 1970
- Commissioned: 25 May 1972
- Out of service: December 2014
- Home port: Callao
- Identification: IMO number: 7025372
- Fate: Towed to be scrapped in Ecuador

General characteristics
- Class & type: Auxiliary Cargo Ship
- Tonnage: 13,000 dwt
- Displacement: 6,750 tons standard 18,400 tons full load
- Length: 153.8 m (505 ft)
- Beam: 20.48 m (67.2 ft)
- Height: Mast height 34.9m
- Draft: 9.39 m (30.8 ft)
- Propulsion: 1 Burmeister & Wain 6K47 diesel 11,600 hp (8.53 MW) 1 shaft
- Speed: 15.6 knots (28.9 km/h; 18.0 mph)
- Capacity: 13,000 tons cargo capacity
- Crew: 7 officers, 64 ratings

The Peruvian Navy Ship BAP Mollendo (ATC 131) is a vessel for transportation and logistics. With 18.400 tons displacement and 154 meters in length, she was built in the shipyards of the Industrial Service of the Navy of Peru (PERU-SIMA) in El Callao. She was released on July 15, 1970 and commissioned to the Navy May 25, 1972. She was originally named Ilo, and had a sister Rimac. Her final name was taken from the town of Mollendo in southern Peru.

She operated as part of 2nd Surface Flotilla. She is prepared to transport vehicles, military personnel and material in logistic support operations.

In 2002, the Mollendo underwent several amendments and fittings to be used as a training ship of the Navy Instruction and has been making trips abroad Instruction Cadets Second and Fourth Year of the Naval School of Peru, visiting many ports of the world
