= Punta de Bombon District =

Coordinates: 17.1668°S 71.8036°W

Punta de Bombon
- District
- Interactive map of Punta de Bombon
- Country: Peru
- Region: Arequipa
- Province: Islay
- Founded: January 3, 1879
- Capital: Punta de Bombon

Government
  - Mayor: Guillermo Mamani Coaquira

Area
  - Total: 769.76 km^{2} (297.21 sq mi)
- Elevation: 9 m (30 ft)

Population (2005 census)
  - Total: 6,746
  - Density: 8.764/km^{2} (22.70/sq mi)
- Time zone: UTC-5 (PET)
- UBIGEO: 040706

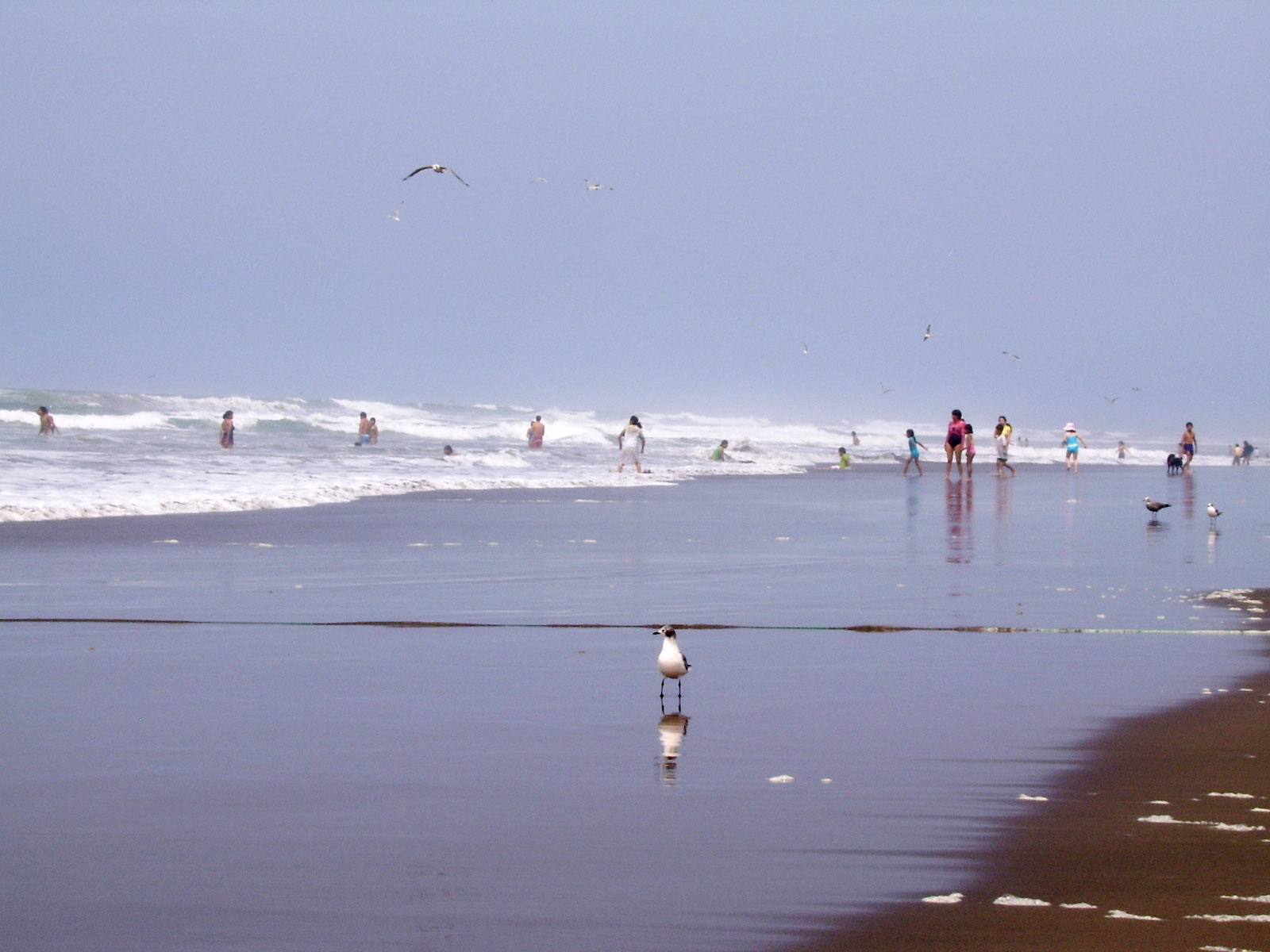

Punta de Bombon District is one of six districts of the province Islay in Peru.
