= Islay District =

Coordinates: 17.0024°S 72.1054°W

Islay
- District
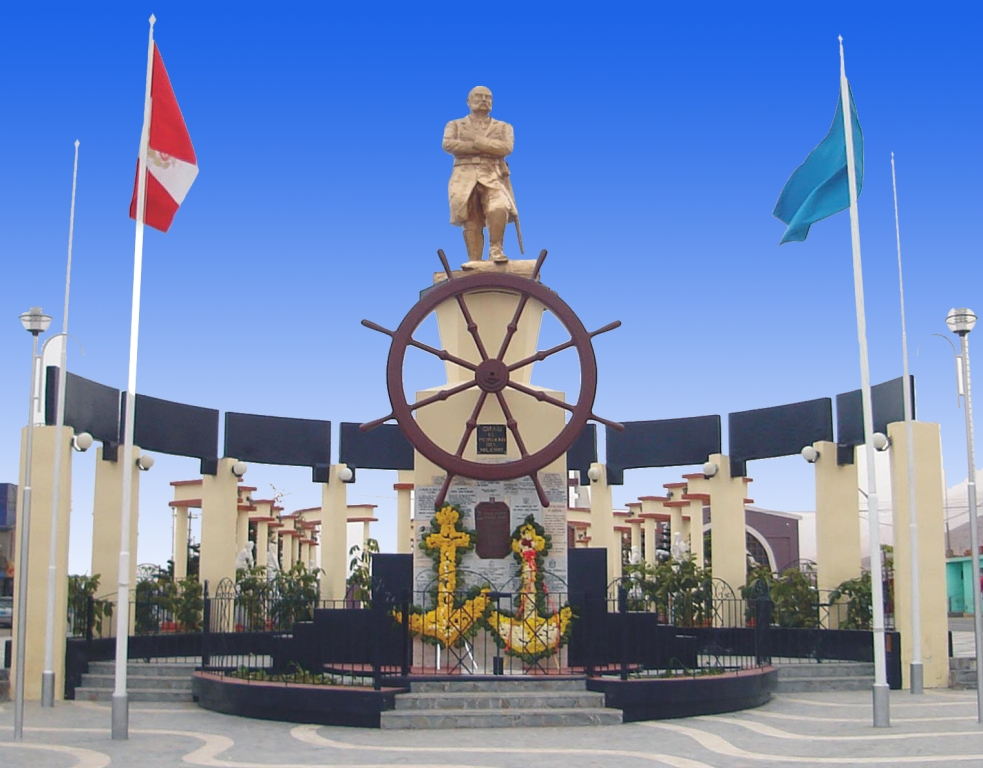
- Main square in Islay

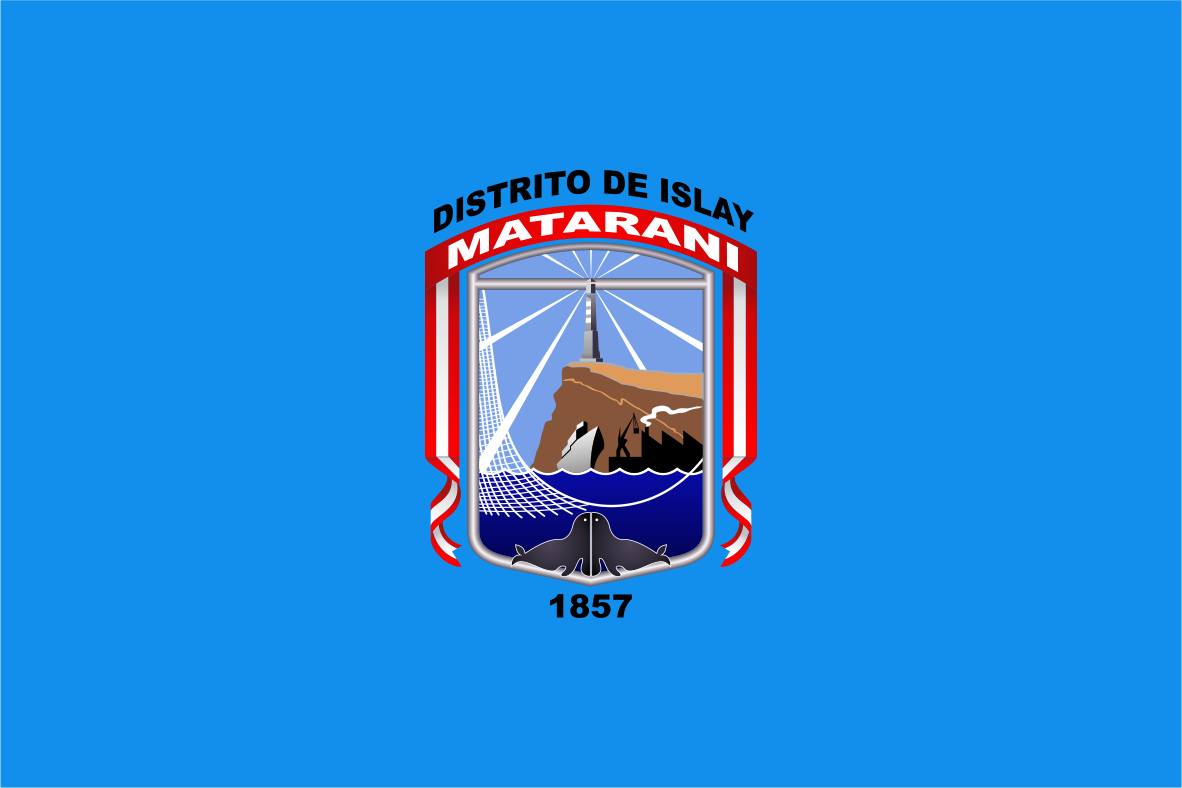
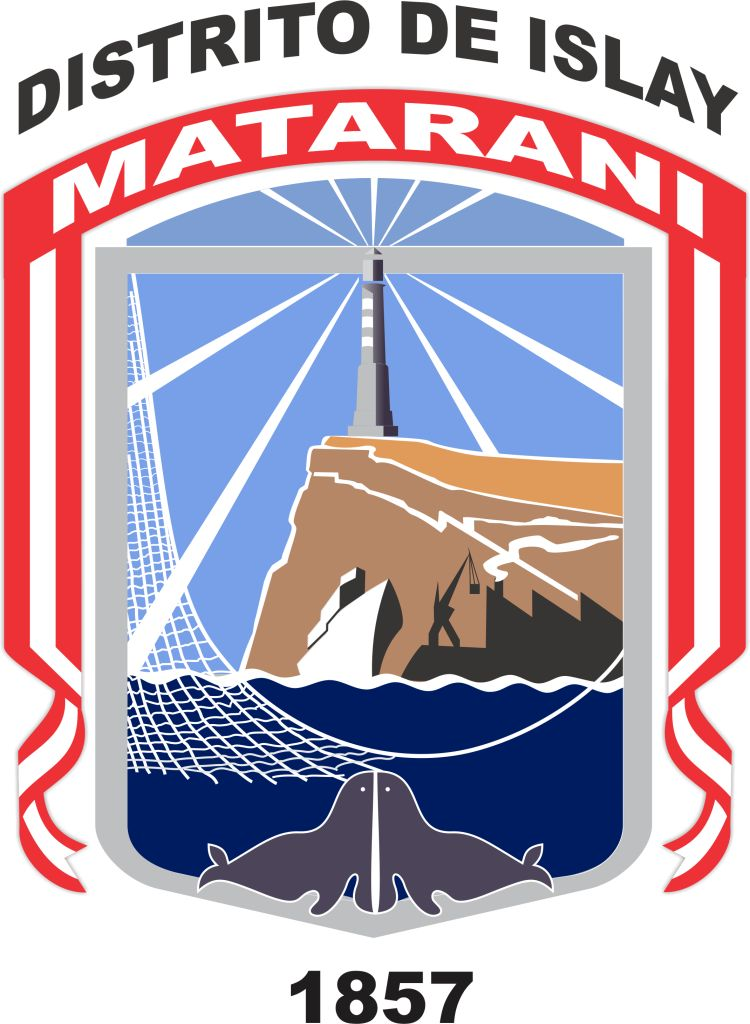
- Flag Coat of arms
- Interactive map of Islay
- Country: Peru
- Region: Arequipa
- Province: Islay
- Founded: January 2, 1857
- Capital: Islay

Government
  - Mayor: Zayden Amante Chavez

Area
  - Total: 384.08 km^{2} (148.29 sq mi)
- Elevation: 100 m (330 ft)

Population (2005 census)
  - Total: 3,926
  - Density: 10.22/km^{2} (26.47/sq mi)
- Time zone: UTC-5 (PET)
- UBIGEO: 040704

Islay District is one of six districts of the province Islay in Peru.
