= Mollendo District =

Coordinates: 17.0207°S 72.0155°W

Mollendo
- District
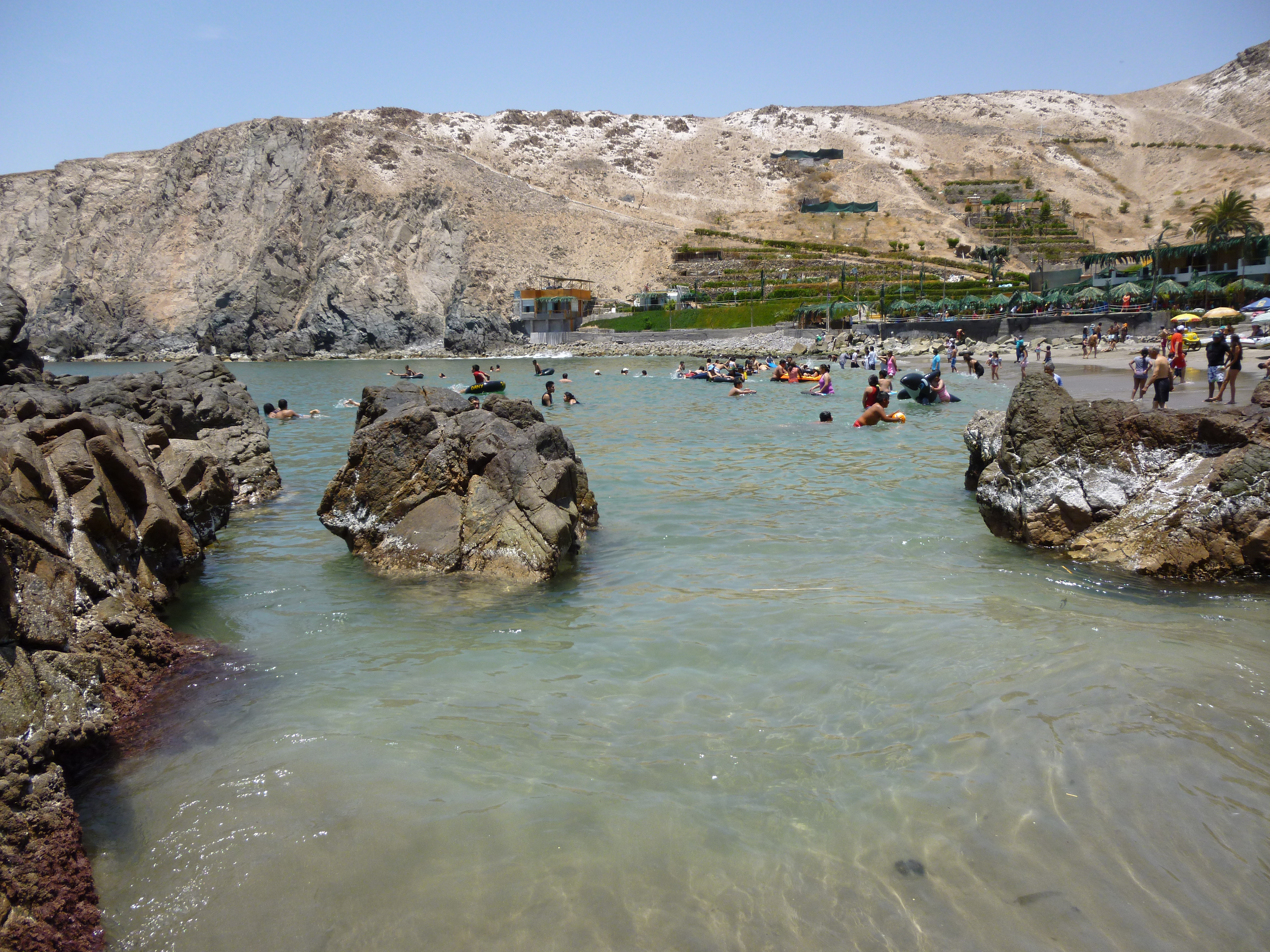
- Interactive map of Mollendo
- Country: Peru
- Region: Arequipa
- Province: Islay
- Founded: January 3, 1879
- Capital: Mollendo

Government
  - Mayor: Miguel Roman Valdivia

Area
  - Total: 960.83 km^{2} (370.98 sq mi)
- Elevation: 26 m (85 ft)

Population (2005 census)
  - Total: 23,672
  - Density: 24.637/km^{2} (63.810/sq mi)
- Time zone: UTC-5 (PET)
- UBIGEO: 040701

Mollendo District is one of six districts of the province Islay in Peru.
