= Sarcocornia =

Formerly-recognized genus of plants

Sarcocornia is a formerly recognized genus of flowering plants in the amaranth family, Amaranthaceae. Species are known commonly as samphires, glassworts, or saltworts. Molecular phylogenetic studies have shown that when separated from Salicornia, the genus is paraphyletic, since Salicornia is embedded within it, and Sarcocornia has now been merged into a more broadly circumscribed Salicornia. When separated from Salicornia, the genus has a cosmopolitan distribution, and is most diverse in the Cape Floristic Region of South Africa.

== Description ==
Species formerly placed in Sarcocornia are perennial herbs, subshrubs or shrubs. They are taking an erect or prostrate, creeping form. The new stems are fleshy and divided into joint-like segments. Older stems are woody and not segmented. The oppositely arranged leaves are borne on fleshy, knobby petioles, their base decurrent and connate (thus forming the segments), the blades forming small, triangular tips with narrow scarious margin.

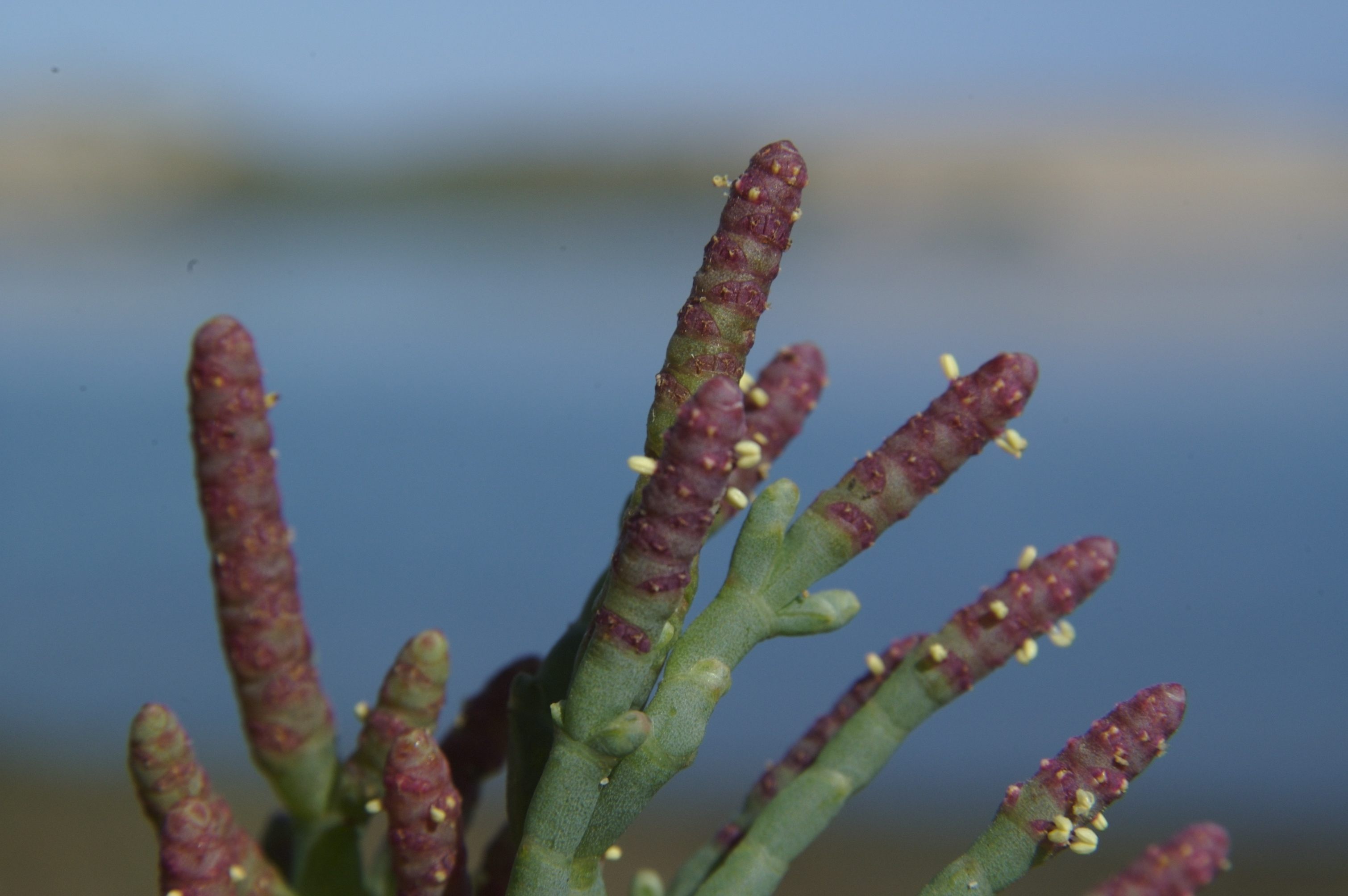
Inflorescences of Salicornia pacifica, formerly Sarcocornia pacifica

The terminal or lateral inflorescences are spike-like, made up of joint-like segments with tiny paired cymes emerging from the joints. Each cyme consists of three (rarely five) flowers completely embedded between the bract and immersed in the fleshy tissue of the axis. The flowers of a cyme are arranged in a transverse row, the central flower separating the lateral flowers, with tissue of the axis between them. The hermaphrodite or unisexual flowers are more or less radially symmetric, with a perianth of three or four fleshy tepals connate nearly to the apex, one or two stamens, and an ovary with two or three stigmas.

The perianth is persistent in fruit. The fruit wall (pericarp) is membranous. The vertical seed is ellipsoid, with light brown, membranous, hairy seed coat, the hairs can be strongly curved, hooked, or conic, straight or slightly curved. The seed contains no perisperm (feeding tissue).

The basic chromosome number is x=9. The species are diploid (18 chromosomes), tetraploid (36), hexaploid (54), or octoploid (72).

== Taxonomy ==
The genus Sarcocornia was first described in 1978 by A J Scott. It separated the perennial species from the closely related annual Salicornia senus stricto, additionally containing some species formerly belonging to the former genus Arthrocnemum. The type species is Sarcocornia perennis.

Sarcocornia/Salicornia began to evolve during the middle Miocene from ancestors in Eurasia, developing four phylogenetic lineages: the first was the Eurasian Sarcocornia clade, further diversifying into the American Sarcocornia clade, then the Salicornia clade, and the South African/Australian Sarcocornia clade. When Salicornia is separated from Sarcocornia to comprise all the annual, more frost tolerant species, the genus Sarcocornia is paraphyletic, since Salicornia evolved within Sarcocornia. The prostrate, mat-forming growth seems to have evolved several times independently. It is probably advantageous in habitats with prolonged flooding, high tidal movement and frost.

A molecular phylogenetic study in 2017 confirmed the paraphyly of Sarcocornia, and merged the genus into Salicornia.

=== Selected former species ===
Accepted names in Salicornia are taken from Plants of the World Online.

- Sarcocornia alpini (Lag.) Rivas-Martınez = Salicornia alpini
- Sarcocornia ambigua (Michx.) M.A.Alonso & M.B.Crespo = Salicornia ambigua
- Sarcocornia andina (Phil.) Freitag, M.A.Alonso & M.B.Crespo = Salicornia andina
- Sarcocornia blackiana (Ulbr.) A.J.Scott = Salicornia blackiana
- Sarcocornia capensis (Moss) A.J.Scott = Salicornia capensis
- Sarcocornia carinata (Fuente, Rufo & Sánchez Mata) Fuente, Rufo & Sánchez Mata = Salicornia alpini subsp. carinata
- Sarcocornia decumbens (Tölken) A.J.Scott = Salicornia decumbens
- Sarcocornia decussata S.Steffen, Mucina & G.Kadereit = Salicornia decussata
- Sarcocornia dunensis (Moss) S.Steffen, Mucina & G.Kadereit = Salicornia dunensis
- Sarcocornia freitagii S. Steffen, Mucina & G.Kadereit = Salicornia helmutii
- Sarcocornia fruticosa (L.) A.J.Scott = Salicornia fruticosa
- Sarcocornia globosa P.G. Wilson = Salicornia globosa
- Sarcocornia hispanica Fuente, Rufo & Sánchez-Mata = Salicornia hispanica
- Sarcocornia lagascae Fuente, Rufo & Sánchez Mata = Salicornia lagascae
- Sarcocornia littorea (Moss) A.J.Scott = Salicornia littorea
- Sarcocornia magellanica (Phil.) M.A.Alonso & M.B.Crespo = Salicornia magellanica
- Sarcocornia mossambicensis Brenan = Salicornia mossambicensis
- Sarcocornia mossiana (Tölken) A.J.Scott = Salicornia mossiana
- Sarcocornia natalensis (Bunge ex Ung.-Sternb.) A.J.Scott = Salicornia natalensis
- Sarcocornia neei (Lag.) M.A.Alonso & M.B.Crespo = Salicornia neei
- Sarcocornia obclavata Yaprak = Salicornia obclavata
- Sarcocornia pacifica (Standl.) A.J.Scott = Salicornia pacifica
- Sarcocornia perennis (Miller) A.J.Scott = Salicornia perennis
- Sarcocornia pillansii (Moss) A.J.Scott = Salicornia pillansii
- Sarcocornia pruinosa Fuente, Rufo & Sánchez-Mata = Salicornia pruinosa
- Sarcocornia pulvinata (R.E.Fr.) A.J.Scott = Salicornia pulvinata
- Sarcocornia quinqueflora (Bunge ex Ung.-Sternb.) A.J. Scott = Salicornia quinqueflora
- Sarcocornia tegetaria S.Steffen, Mucina & G.Kadereit = Salicornia tegetaria
- Sarcocornia terminalis (Tölken) A.J.Scott = Salicornia terminalis
- Sarcocornia utahensis (Tidestr.) A.J.Scott = Salicornia utahensis
- Sarcocornia xerophila (Tölken) A.J.Scott = Salicornia xerophila
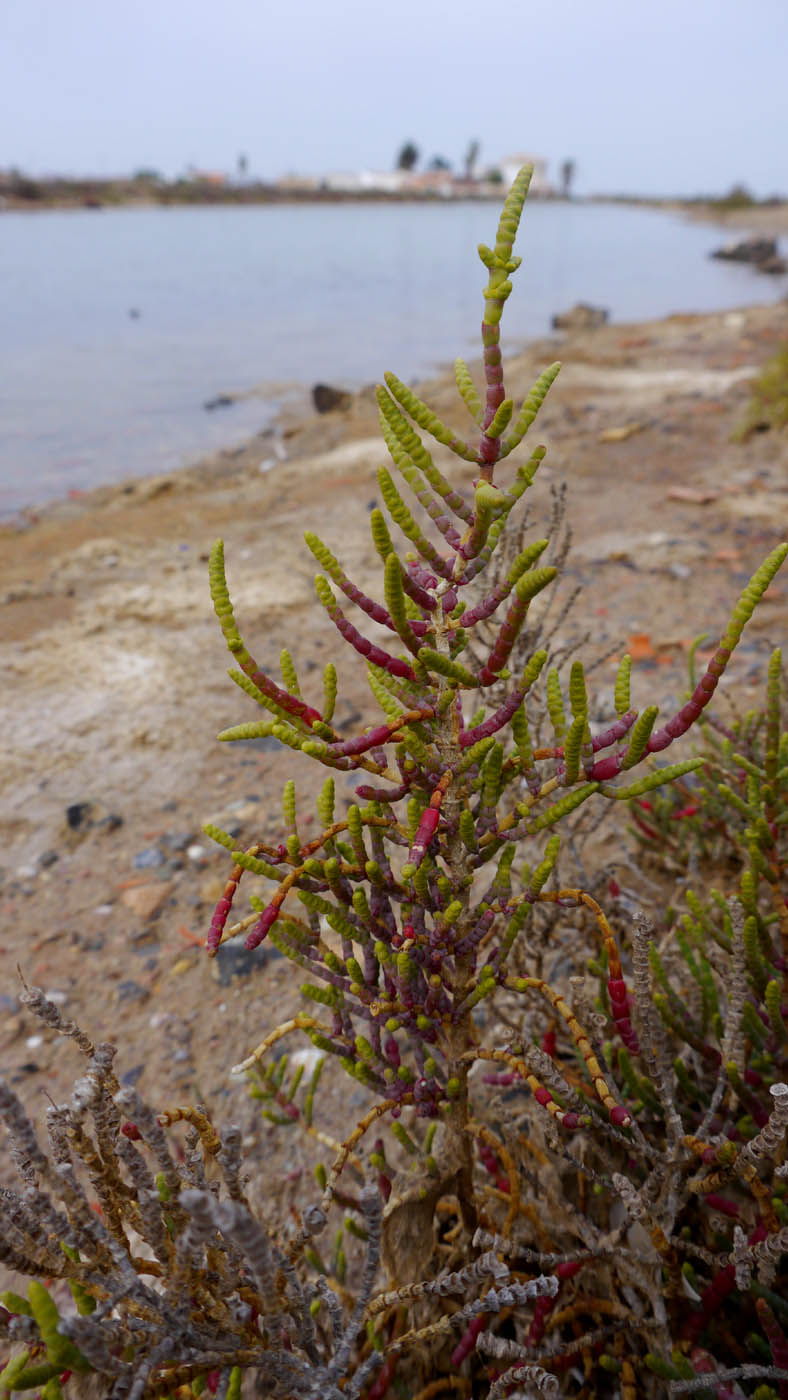
Salicornia fruticosa (syn. Sarcocornia fruticosa)

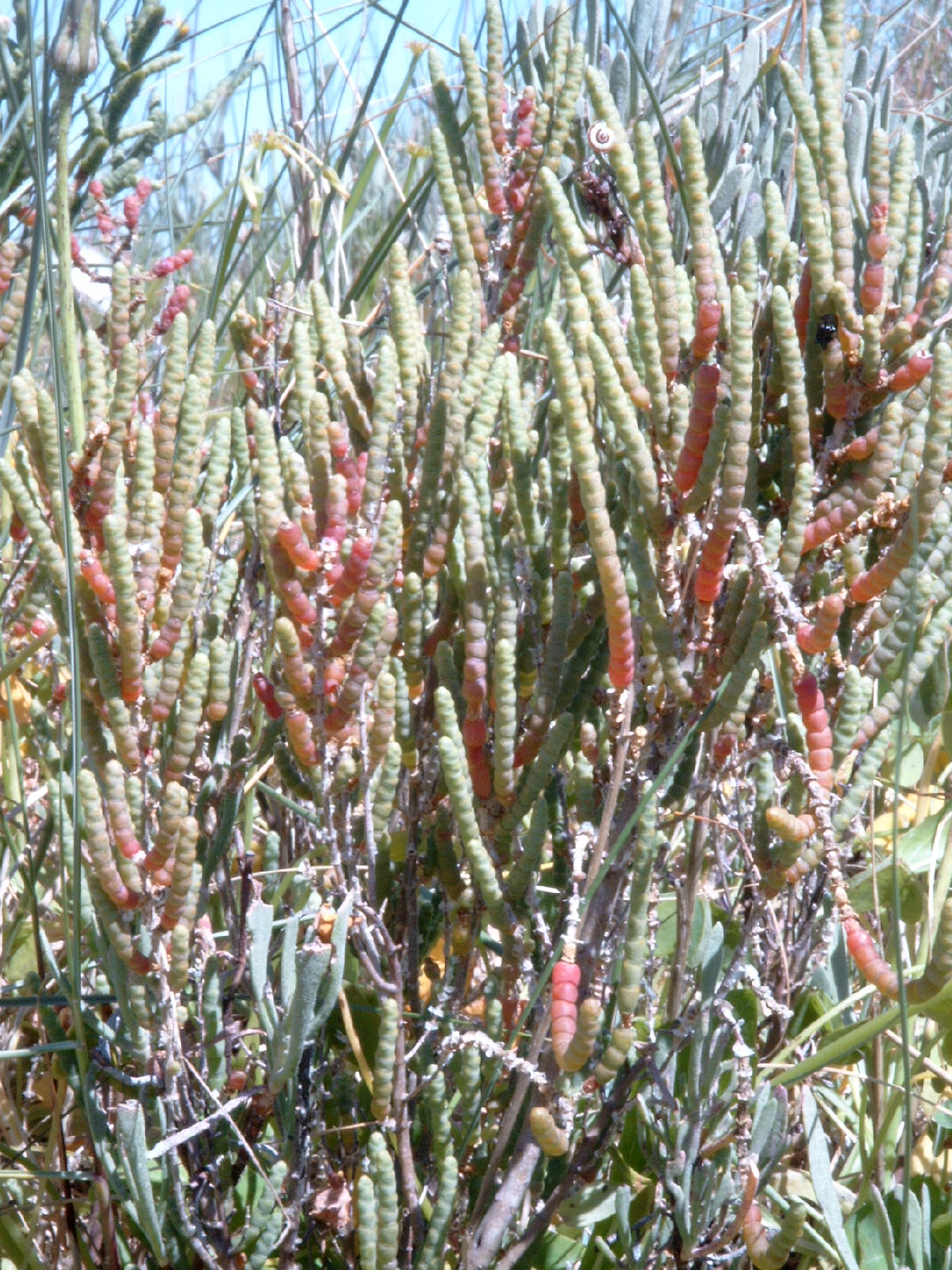
Salicornia perennis (syn. Sarcocornia perennis)

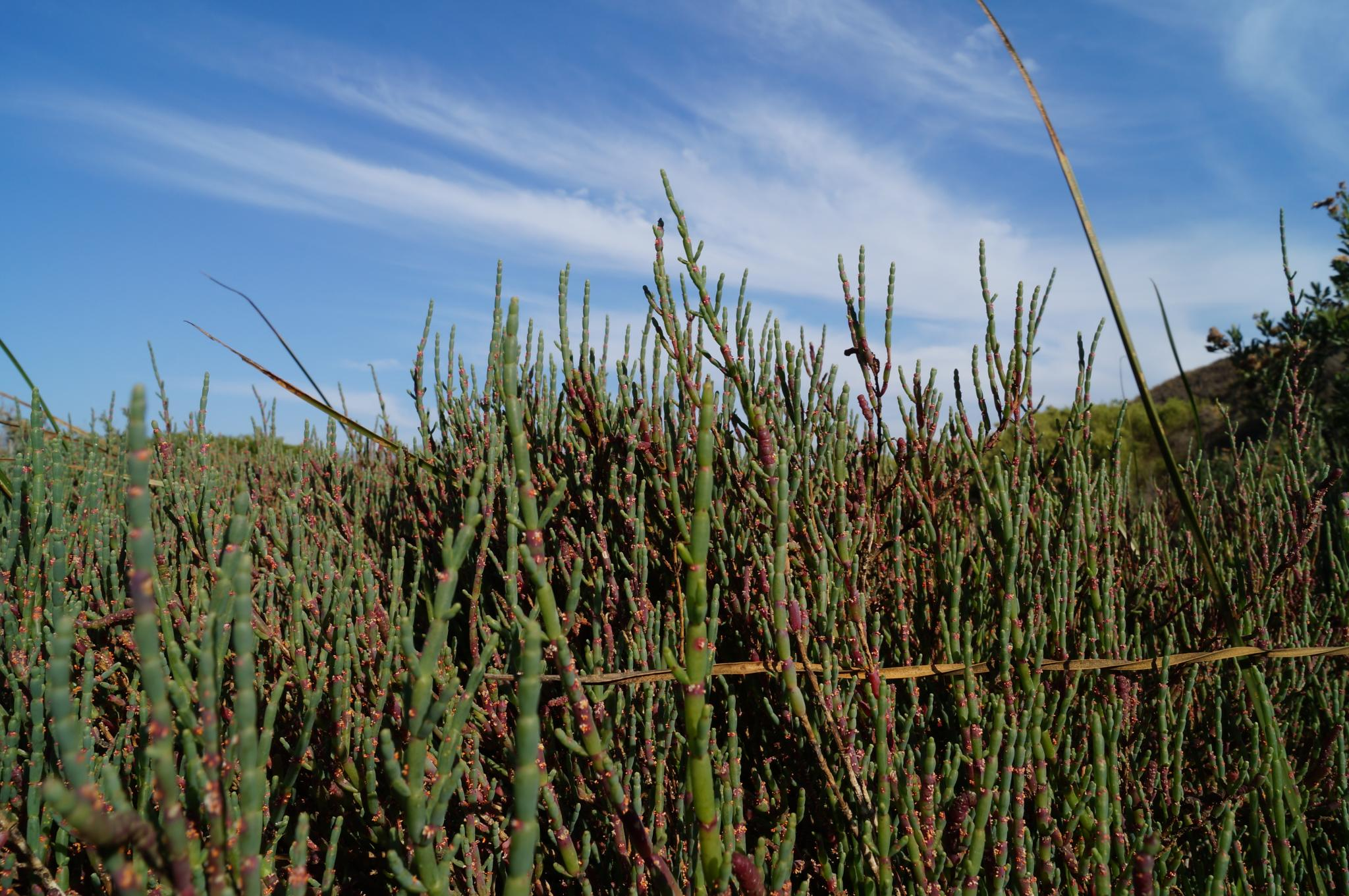
Salicornia neei (syn. Sarcocornia neei)

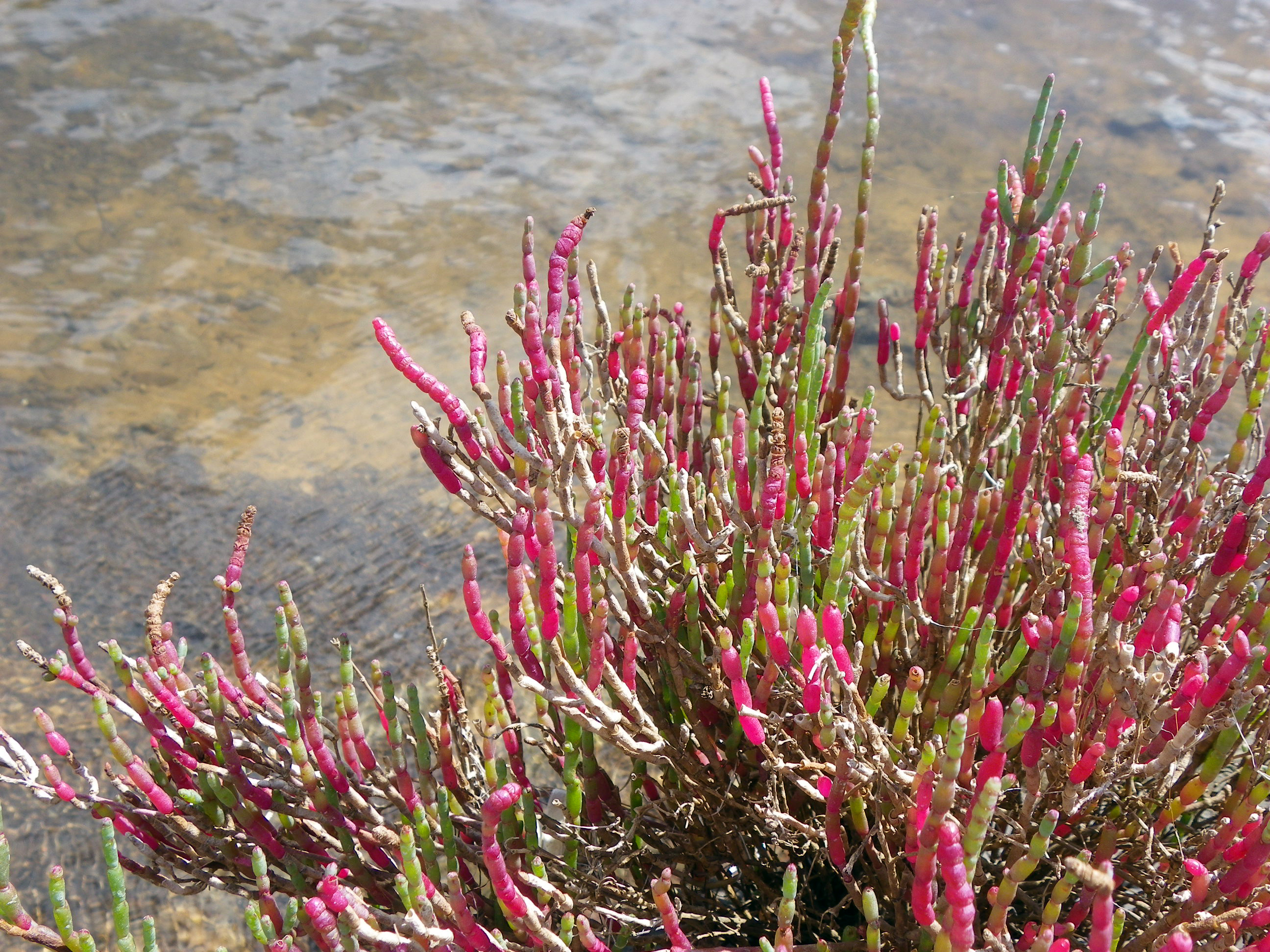
Salicornia quinqueflora (syn. Sarcocornia quinqueflora)
