= Mejía District =

Coordinates: 17.1025°S 71.9675°W

Mejía
- District
- Interactive map of Mejía
- Country: Peru
- Region: Arequipa
- Province: Islay
- Founded: January 27, 1920
- Capital: Mejía

Government
  - Mayor: Marta Violeta Socorro Franco De Zimmermann

Area
  - Total: 100.78 km^{2} (38.91 sq mi)
- Elevation: 23 m (75 ft)

Population (2005 census)
  - Total: 1,263
  - Density: 12.53/km^{2} (32.46/sq mi)
- Time zone: UTC-5 (PET)
- UBIGEO: 040705

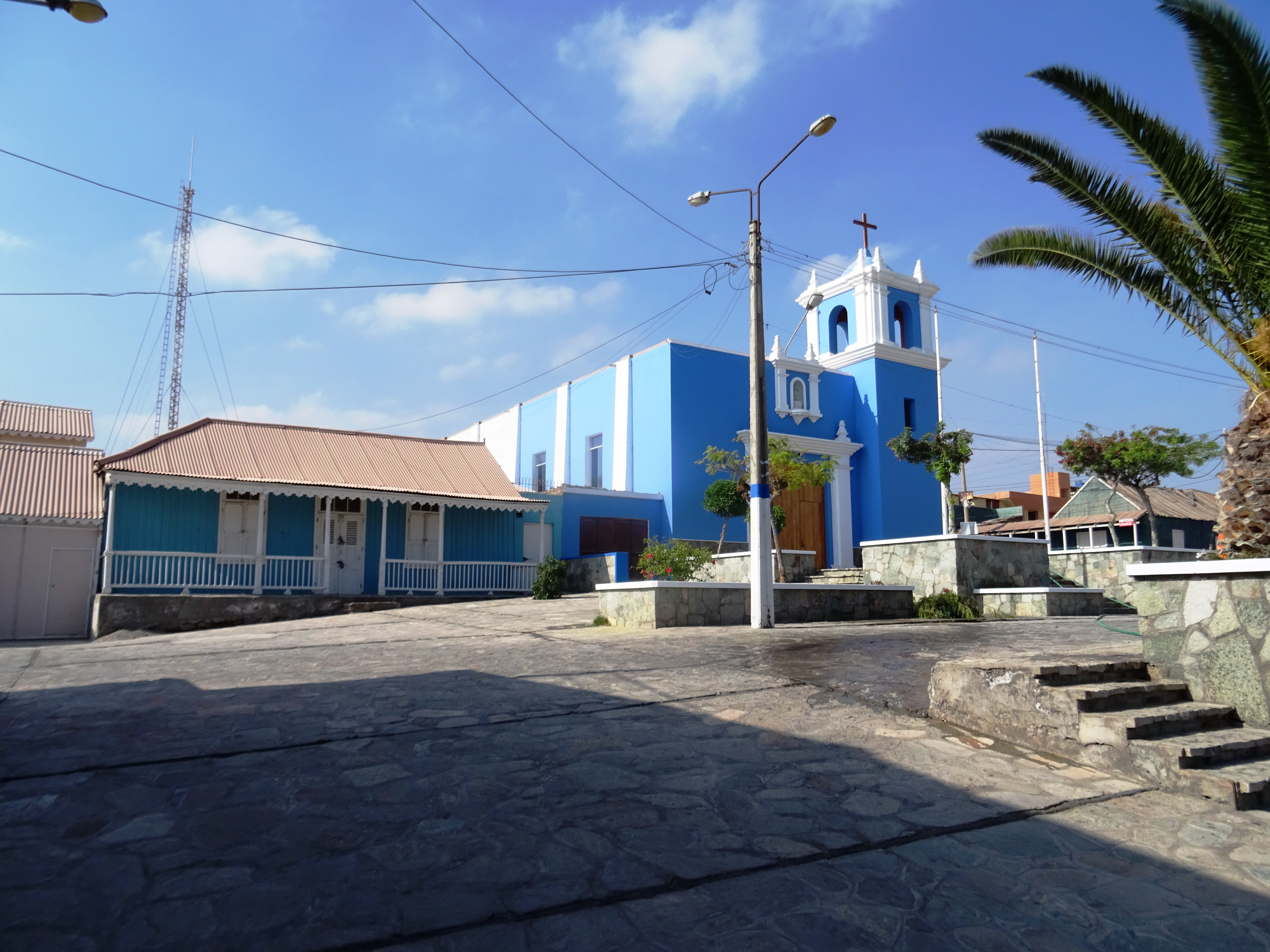

Mejía District is one of six districts of the province Islay in Peru.

It is a popular summertime destination for vacationers from Arequipa.
