= Mollendo =

- Town
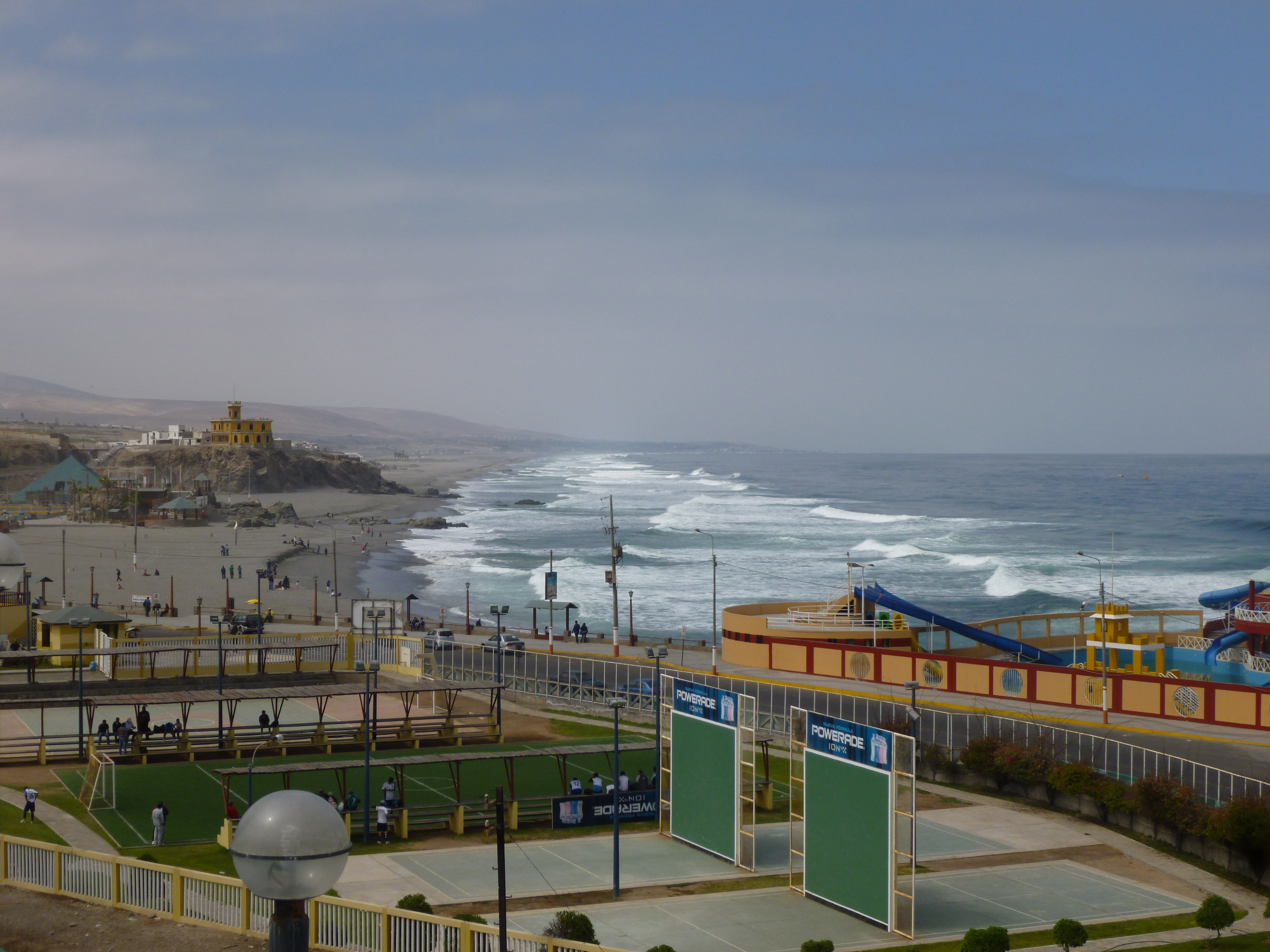
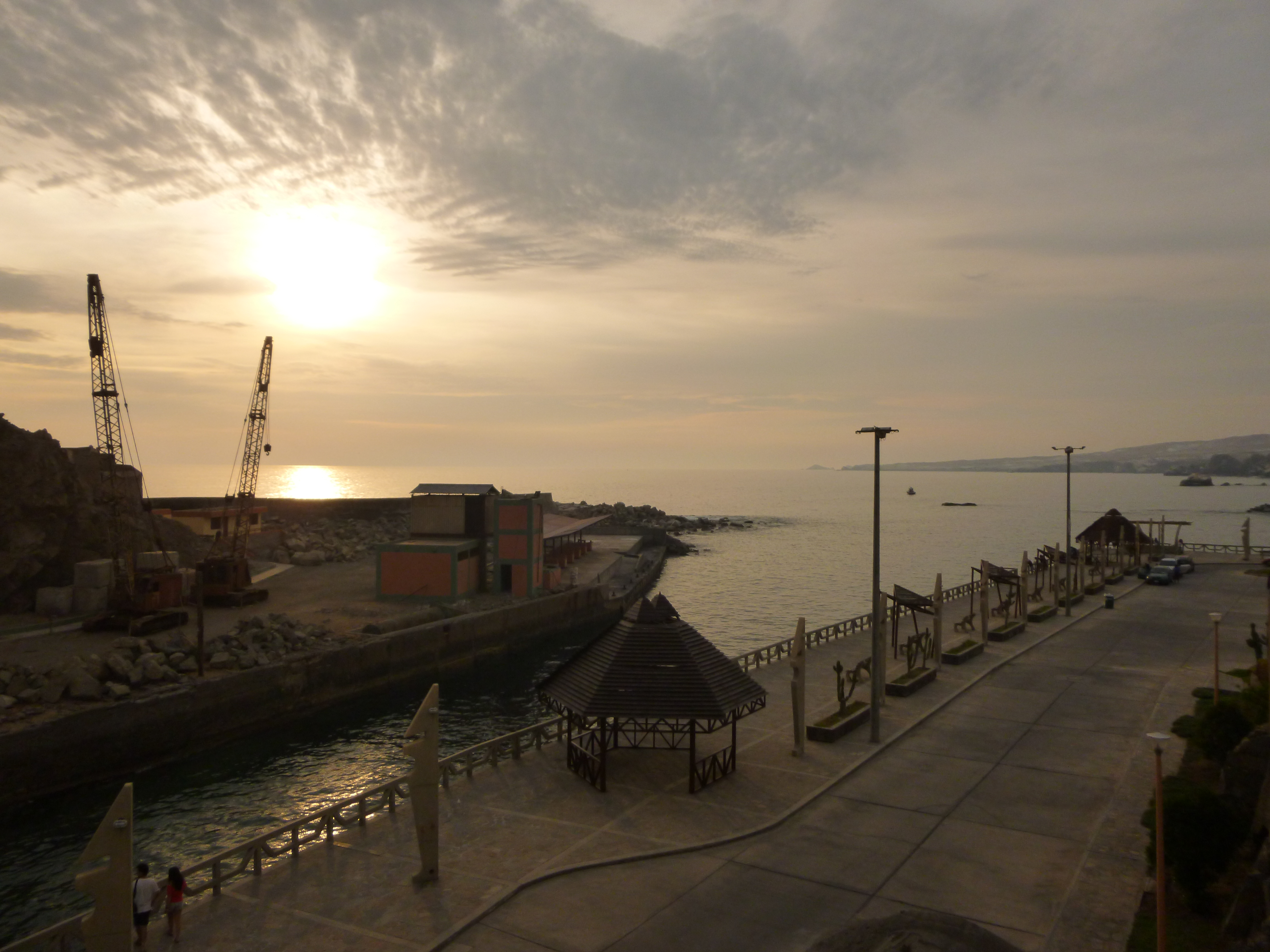
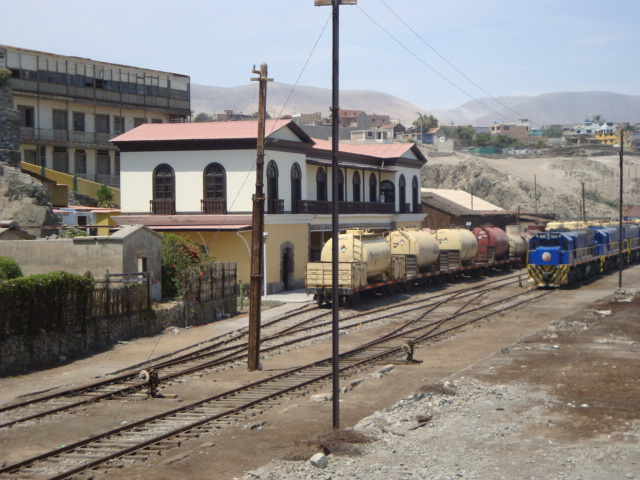
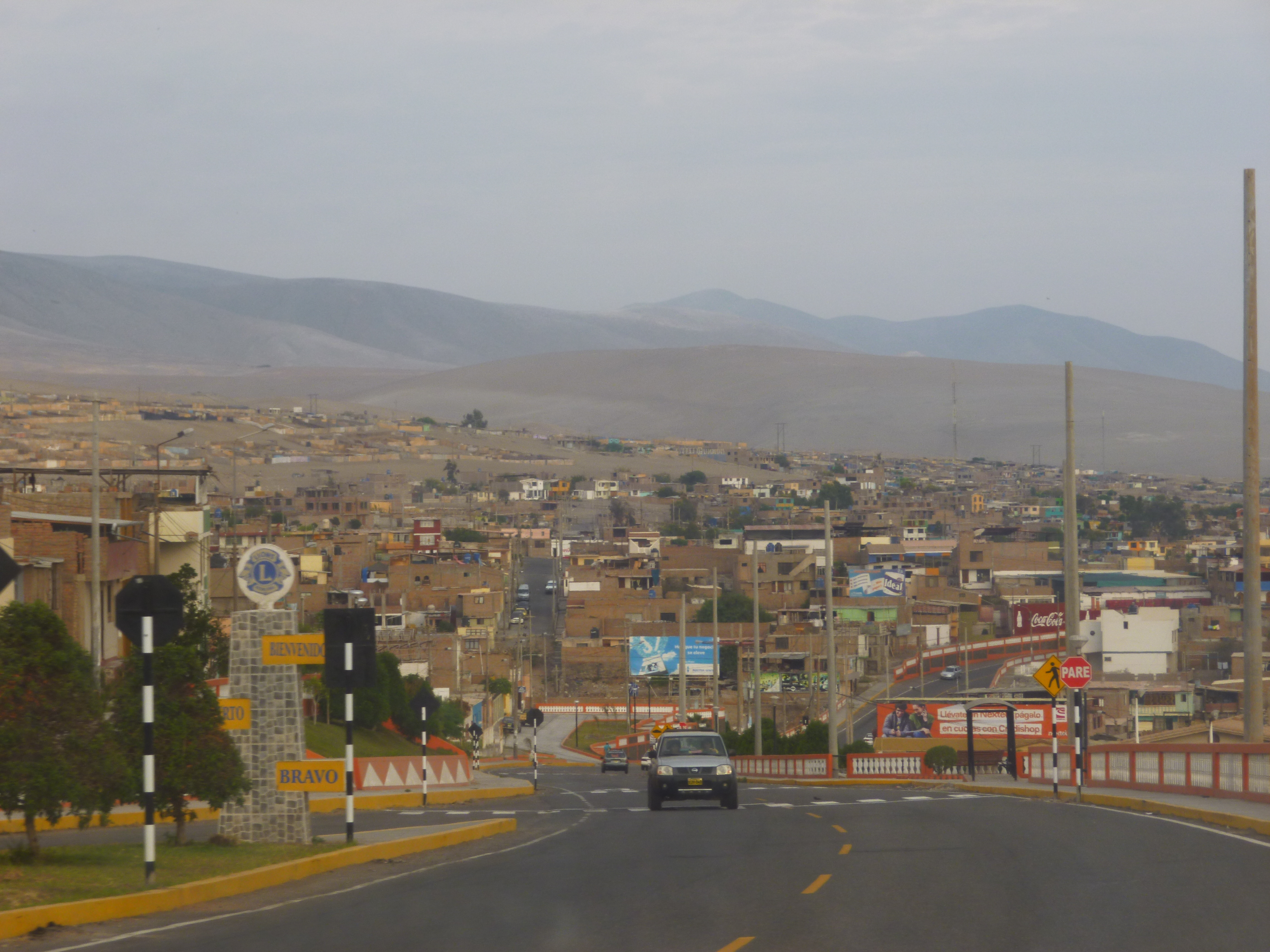
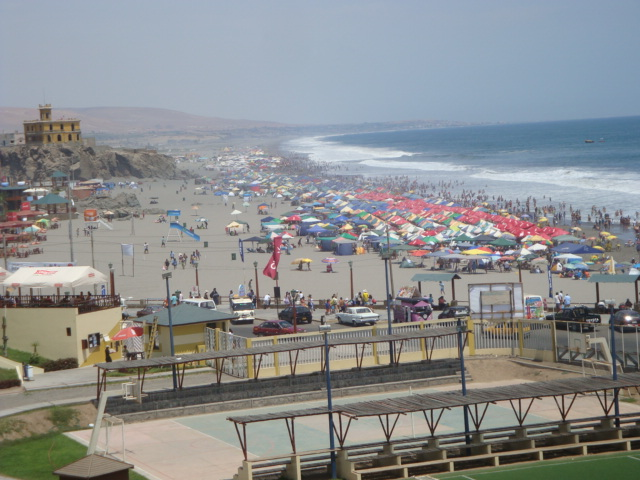
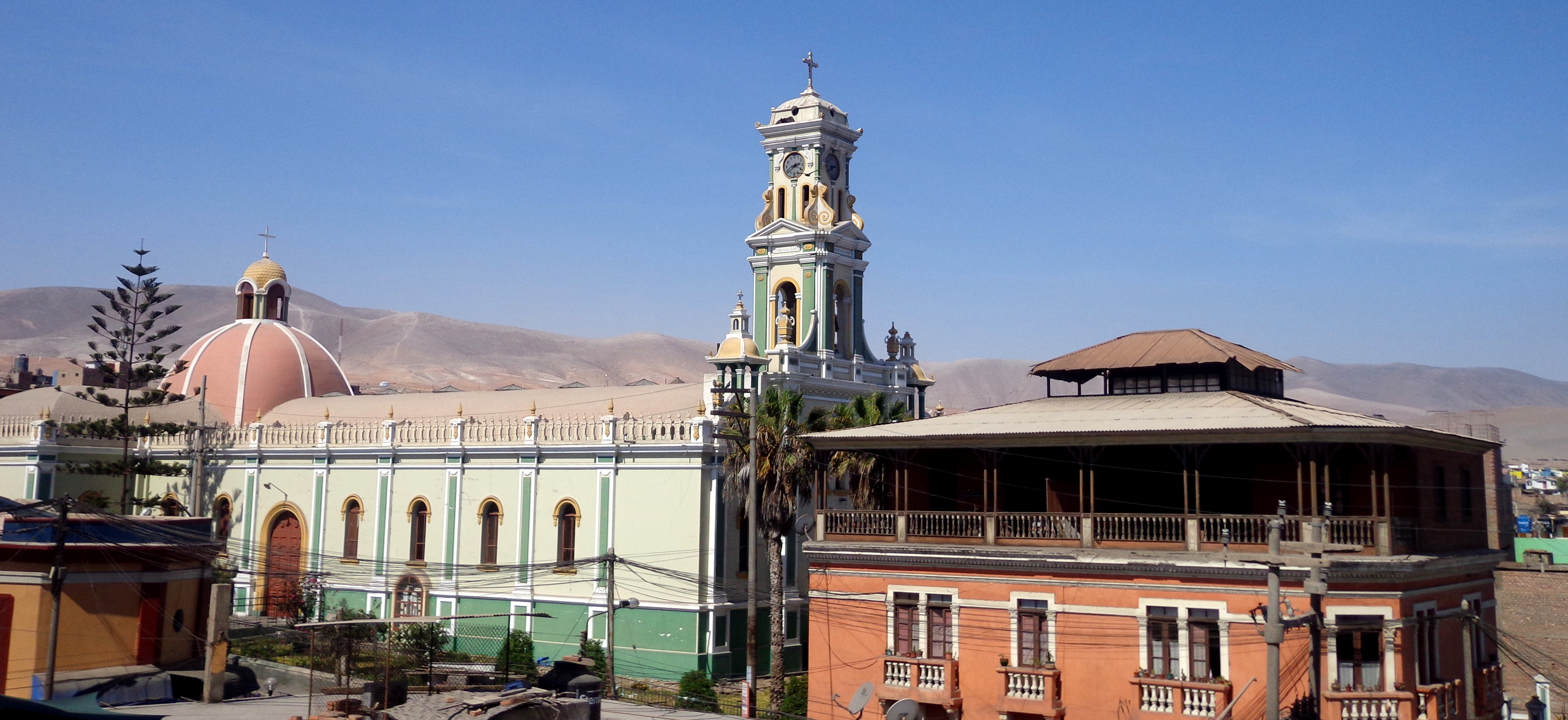

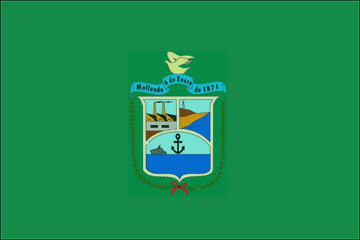
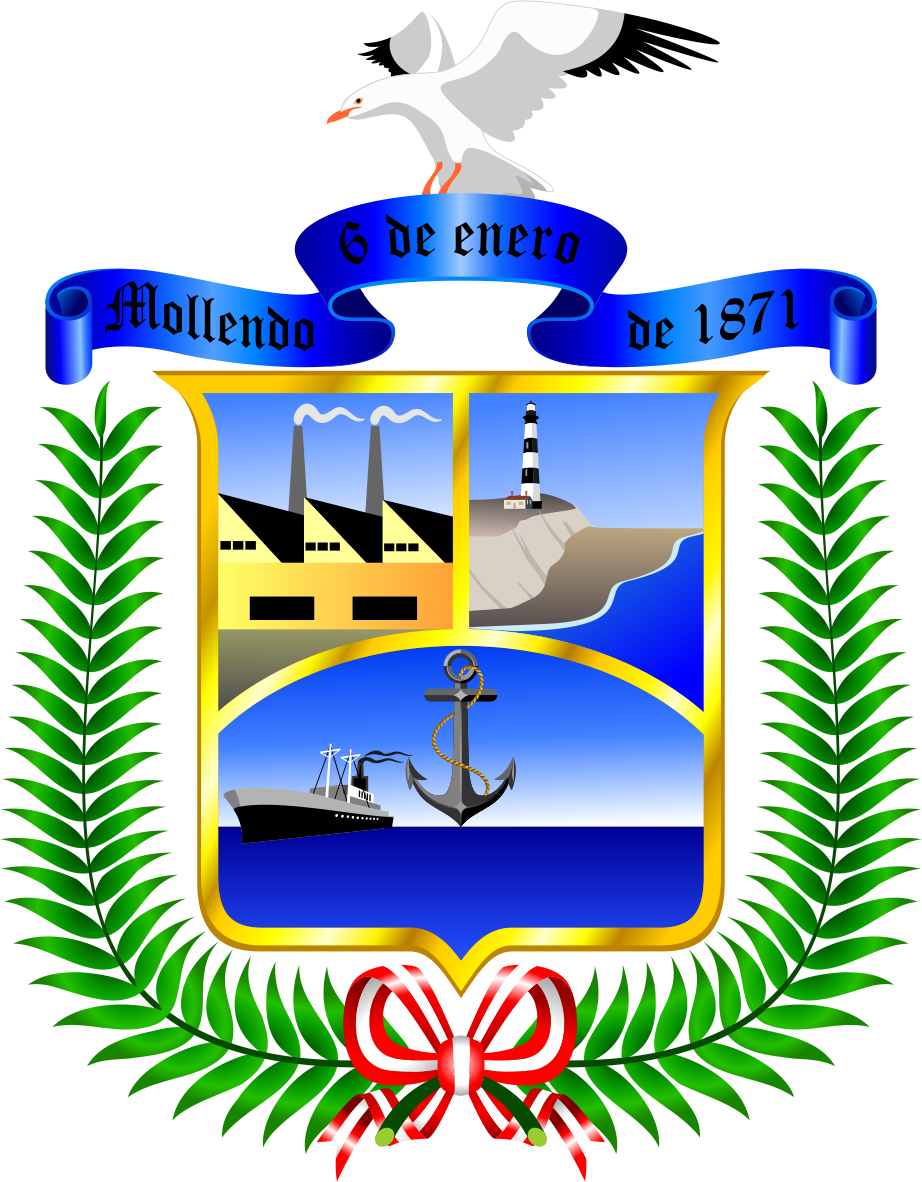
- Flag Seal
- Nickname: Puerto Bravo
- Location within Peru
- Coordinates: 17°1′23″S 72°0′53″W
- Country: Peru
- Region: Arequipa Region
- Province: Islay
- District: Mollendo District
- Established: 6 January 1871
- Founder: Henry Meiggs

Government
  - Mayor: Edgar Augusto Rivera Cervera
- Elevation: 27 m (89 ft)

Population (2017)
  - Total: 17,614
- Time zone: UTC-5 (PET)
  - Summer (DST): UTC-5 (PET)
- Area code: 054
- Website: www.munimollendo.gob.pe

Mollendo is a town on the Pacific Ocean in southern Peru. It is located in the Arequipa Region and is the capital of both the Islay Province and the Mollendo District. Mollendo was the main port on the Peruvian southern coast until Matarani was developed around the mid-20th century; the port of Mollendo serves fishermen for the local economy and all the commercial shipping is done through Matarani, 12 km to the north, as the old port is in ruins. From about 1830 to 1880 it was a key port in the guano trade.

A railroad used to run passenger trains daily, but a developed highway connects Mollendo to the Panamerican Highway, with the train now only running as a summer express from Arequipa, on Saturday, returning Sunday. The local beaches are the main attraction in the area, even though it is visited by the Humboldt Current that brings cold water from Antarctica. In the summer months, from December to April, the population more than doubles as people from the largest city in the region (Arequipa) use Mollendo and its beaches as a vacation spot, especially on weekends. Mollendo exports wool and has industries producing cement, textiles, canned fish, and cheese. The ships BAP Mollendo of the Peruvian Navy are named after the town.

== History ==
=== The Inca era ===
About 1300, the legendary Inca Mayta Cápac, puts the regions of Arequipa and Moquegua under the control of the Inca empire. Sixty three years later, and according to Garcilaso de la Vega, the Inca Cápac Yupanqui, following traditional customs of the Inca Empire, selected four generals from his major staff and entrusted them the command of approximately twenty thousand soldiers (or Tuqui Titos) for the coast region conquest project.

Cápac Yupanqui's son, Sinchi Rocca, conquered all of Arequipa and Moquegua coast area. From this event and ahead, Tambo is a main protagonist into the region history, due their geographical position and serving as weapons and food supply depot. Inca Yawar Waqaq, successor of Inca Cápac Yupanqui, established his supply depots and headquarters in this valley, to march into Atacama (north Chilean region) direction to expand the territory of the Inca Empire.

=== First inhabitants ===
After Tiahuanaco's culture decadency and during the Inca era, the Peruvian south coast was occupied by several tribes:

- The "Tampus" stationed into today Tambo region.
- The "Chullis" corresponding to Chule zone.
- The "Changos" located between the Aranta and Islay zones.

The river basin formed by the Tambo river, probably conquest and occupied by external forces during several periods, generate a population with local and heterogeneous customs, leaving several vestiges about their civilization, suddenly attached to the remaining mixed etymology name from several languages such as Quechua, Cocachacra, Challascapi, etc. Another external influences were the Kauiqui and Puquina with characteristic suffixes such as ando, endo, indo. Some examples are: Cachendo, Mollendo, Huarindo, Catarindo, etc.

A large population was located along the valley and nearing hills, serving it from subterranean waters. Influence of the sea was decisive on the valley and coast inhabitants were the mama coccha (the sea creator) provide them with fish and sea fruits.

=== War of the Pacific ===
During the War of the Pacific Mollendo was invaded by Chilean forces under the command of Colonel Orozimbo Barbosa. The main aim of this force (transported by the Chilean Navy) was to wreak havoc on Southern Peru, so as to force the process of negotiations for peace between Peru and Chile. The invasion forces consisted of the 3rd Chilean Line Infantry Regiment, The Chilean Marines, One brigade of Chilean Sappers, and 30 Horse Cavalry. The defenses of Mollendo consisted of two small forts with no cannon ( which were days earlier transported to Arequipa) defended by 100 soldiers. The first to disembark were the Chilean Marines, who took the town without a struggle. The rest (Main Body) of the expedition landed on or near Islay, without opposition. On March 9, 1880, the Main Body of the expedition entered Mollendo. Colonel Barbosa with 500 soldiers left Mollendo towards Mejia in search of the defenders, leaving the 3rd Chilean Line Infantry in charge of the town, looting of homes quickly began. Colonel Barbosa arrived in Mejia, destroying the locomotives and railtracks to prevent reinforcements arriving from Arequipa via rail. Colonel Barbosa surprised the defenders at Ensenada, taking 20 prisoners. Upon his return to Mollendo, he learned of the sacking of the town, punishing some members of his command. This resulted in some desertions.

== Airport ==
The town of Mollendo is serviced by the small civilian Mollendo Airport ICAO Code (SPDO)

== Railway ==
The town is served by the standard gauge Southern Railway of Peru, which connects with Cuzco and Puno.

== Notable residents ==
- Abimael Guzmán, Maoist leader

== See also ==
- Railway stations in Peru
