= Cocachacra District =

Coordinates: 17.0915°S 71.7701°W

Cocachacra Kukachakra
- District
- Interactive map of Cocachacra
- Country: Peru
- Region: Arequipa
- Province: Islay
- Founded: January 3, 1879
- Capital: Cocachacra

Government
  - Mayor: Hilario Julio Cornejo (2019-2022)

Area
  - Total: 1,536.96 km^{2} (593.42 sq mi)
- Elevation: 73 m (240 ft)

Population (2017)
  - Total: 8,347
  - Density: 5.431/km^{2} (14.07/sq mi)
- Time zone: UTC-5 (PET)
- UBIGEO: 040702

Cocachacra District is one of the six districts of the province of Islay in Peru. It is spread over an area of 1,549 km².
