= Deán Valdivia District =

Coordinates: 17.1405°S 71.8221°W

Deán Valdivia
- District
- Interactive map of Deán Valdivia
- Country: Peru
- Region: Arequipa
- Province: Islay
- Founded: October 23, 1952
- Capital: La Curva

Government
  - Mayor: Richard Hitler Ale Cruz

Area
  - Total: 134.08 km^{2} (51.77 sq mi)
- Elevation: 13 m (43 ft)

Population (2005 census)
  - Total: 6,420
  - Density: 47.9/km^{2} (124/sq mi)
- Time zone: UTC-5 (PET)
- UBIGEO: 040703

Deán Valdivia District is one of six districts of the province Islay in Peru.
