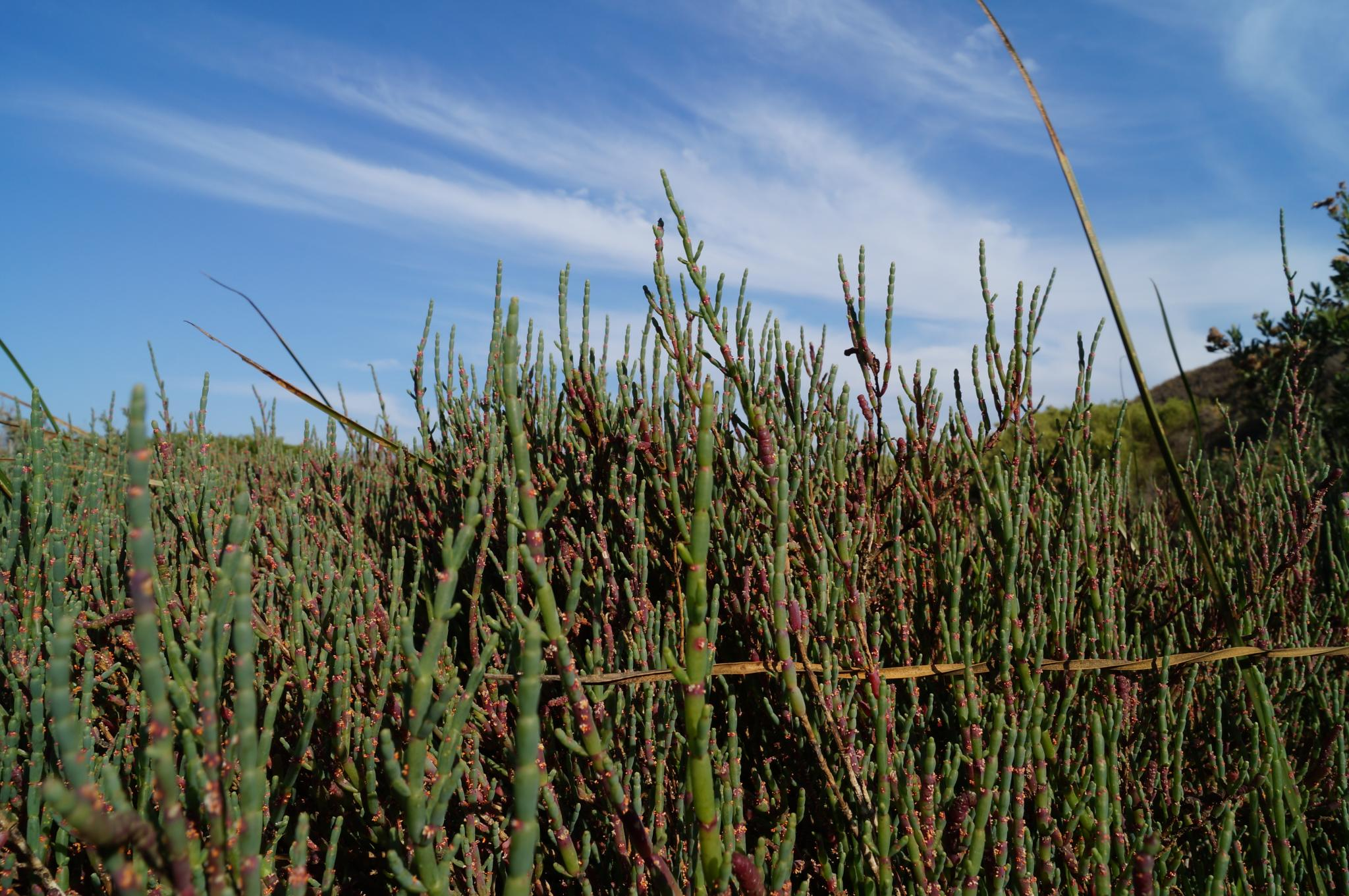

Scientific classification
- Kingdom: Plantae
- Clade: Tracheophytes
- Clade: Angiosperms
- Clade: Eudicots
- Order: Caryophyllales
- Family: Amaranthaceae
- Genus: Salicornia
- Species: S. neei

Binomial name
- Salicornia neei Lag.

Synonyms
- Salicornia bergii Lorentz & Niederl.; Salicornia copiapina Phil.; Salicornia corticosa (Meyen) Walp. ex Ung.-Sternb.; Salicornia doeringii Lorentz & Niederl.; Salicornia fruticosa var. corticosa (Walp. ex Ung.-Sternb.) Gunckel; Salicornia fruticosa var. doeringii (Lorentz & Niederl.) Speg.; Salicornia fruticosa var. macrostachya Speg.; Salicornia gaudichaudiana Moq.; Salicornia peruviana Kunth; Salsola coquimbana Molina; Salsola corticosa Meyen; Sarcocornia neei (Lag.) M.A.Alonso & M.B.Crespo

= Salicornia neei =

Species of flowering plant

Salicornia neei is a species of flowering plant in the family Amaranthaceae, native to Venezuela, the Galápagos, mainland Ecuador to South Brazil and Southern South America. It was first described in 1817.
