= Islay province =

Coordinates: 17.019836°S 72.016052°W

Islay
- Province
- Coat of arms

- Location of Islay in the Arequipa Region
- Country: Peru
- Region: Arequipa
- Capital: Mollendo

Government
  - Mayor: Edgar Augusto Rivera Cervera (2019-2022)

Area
  - Total: 3,886.49 km^{2} (1,500.58 sq mi)

Population
  - Total: 52,034
  - Density: 13.388/km^{2} (34.676/sq mi)
- UBIGEO: 0407
- Website: Official Website

Islay is the smallest of eight provinces in the Arequipa Region of Peru.

== Political division ==
The province is divided into six districts which are:

- Cocachacra (Cocachacra)
- Dean Valdivia (La Curva)
- Islay (Islay)
- Mejía (Mejía)
- Mollendo (Mollendo)
- Punta de Bombon (Punta de Bombon)

== Ethnic groups ==
The province is inhabited by indigenous citizens of Aymara and Quechua descent. Spanish, however, is the language which the majority of the population (85.11%) learnt to speak in childhood, 10.59% of the residents started speaking using the Quechua language and 3.24% using Aymara (2007 Peru Census).
