= List of reptiles of Morocco =

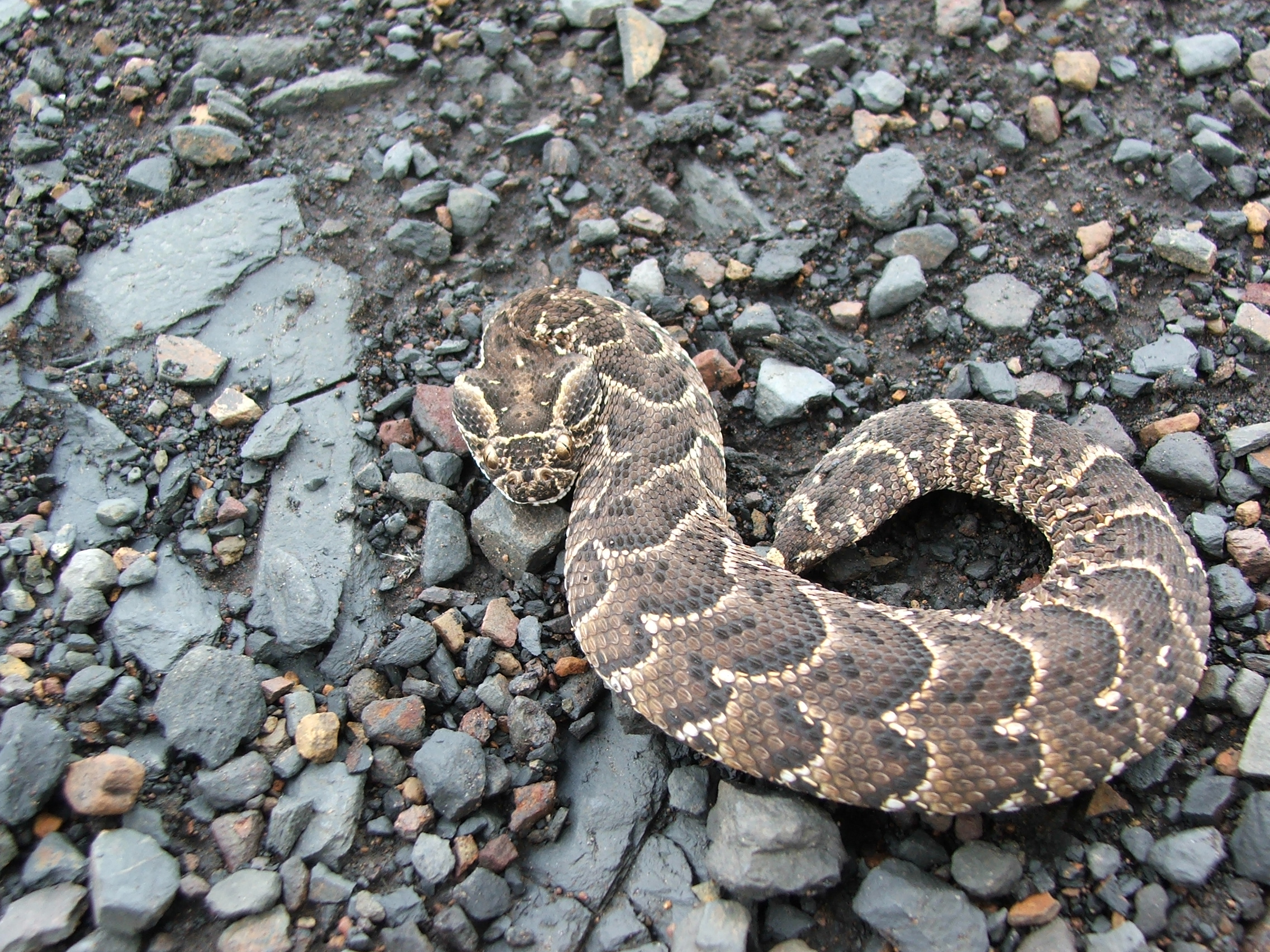
The puff adder, is found in the south of Morocco

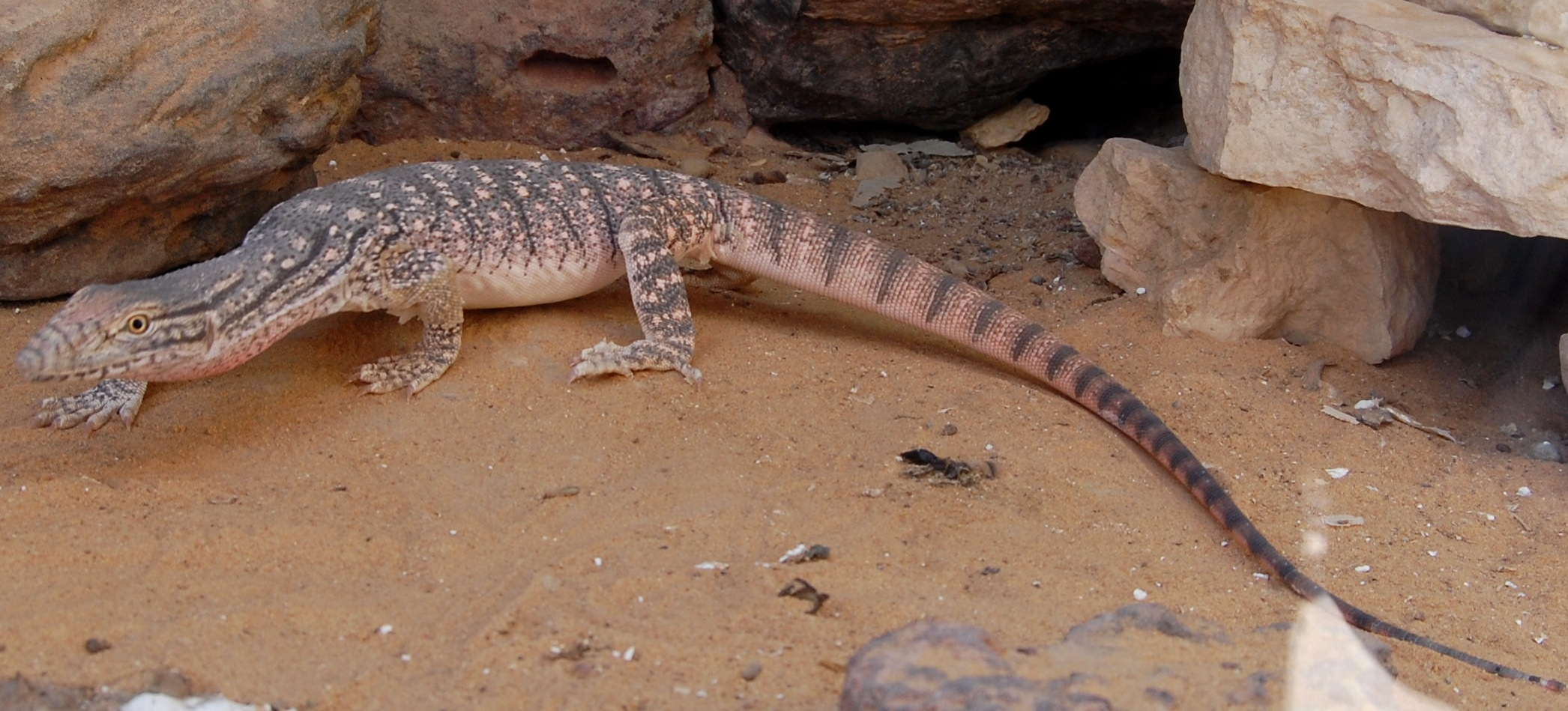
The desert monitor, is a threatened species in Morocco

This list of reptiles of Morocco is an incomplete collection of reptiles found in Morocco.

- ^{[e]} Endemic species
- ^{[i]} Introduced species

== Crocodilians ==
=== Family Crocodylidae ===
Species	Common name	Photo
Crocodylus suchus extirpated	West African crocodile	
Crocodylus niloticus extirpated	Nile crocodile	

== Lizards ==
=== Family Trogonophidae ===
Species	Common name	Photo
Trogonophis wiegmanni	Checkerboard worm lizard	

=== Family Agamidae ===
Species	Common name	Photo
Agama bibronii	Bibron's agama	
Trapelus mutabilis	Changeable agama	
Uromastyx acanthinura	Bell's dab lizard / mastigure / spiny tailed agama	
Uromastyx flavifasciata	Banded dob / mastigure	
Uromastyx dispar	Malian dob	
Uromastyx occidentalis	Western giant dob	

=== Family Anguidae ===
Species	Common name	Photo
Ophisaurus koellikeri ^{[e]}	Moroccan glass lizard	

=== Family Chamaeleonidae ===
Species	Common name	Photo
Chamaeleo chamaeleon	Common chameleon	

=== Family Gekkonidae ===
Species	Common name	Photo
Tarentola mauritanica	Moorish wall gecko	
Tarentola boehmei	Böhme's gecko	
Tarentola deserti	Desert wall gecko	
Tarentola annularis	Ringed wall gecko	
Tarentola ephippiata hoggarensis	Hoggar gecko	
Tarentola chazaliae	Helmeted gecko	
Hemidactylus turcicus	Turkish gecko	
Hemidactylus brooki	Brook's gecko	
Saurodactylus brosseti	Morocco lizard-fingered gecko	
Stenodactylus petrii	Anderson's short-fingered gecko	
Stenodactylus sthenodactylus	Lichtenstein's short-fingered gecko	

=== Family Lacertidae ===
Species	Common name	Photo
Timon tangitanus	North African eyed lizard	
Lacerta andreanskyi	Atlas dwarf lizard	
Acanthodactylus boskianus	Bosc's fringe-toed lizard	
Acanthodactylus erythrurus	Spiny-footed lizard	
Acanthodactylus longipes	Long fringe-fingered lizard	
Scelarcis perspicillata	Moroccan rock lizard	
Podarcis hispanica vaucheri	Iberian wall lizard	
Psammodromus algirus	Large psammodromus	
Psammodromus blanci	Blanc's sand racer	
Psammodromus microdactylus	Green psammodromus	
Psammodromus hispanicus	Spanish psammodromus	
Ophisops occidentalis	Mograbin snake-eyed lizard	
Mesalina guttulata	Small spotted lizard	
Mesalina olivieri	Olivier's small lizard	
Mesalina pasteuri	Pasteur's small lizard	
Quedenfeldtia trachyblepharus	Atlas day gecko	

=== Family Scincidae ===
Species	Common name	Photo
Chalcides mauritanicus	Two-fingered skink	
Chalcides ocellatus	Ocellated skink	
Eumeces algeriensis	Algerian skink	

=== Family Varanidae ===
Species	Common name	Photo
Varanus griseus	Desert monitor	

== Snakes ==
=== Family Boidae ===
Species	Common name	Photo
Eryx jaculus	Javelin sand boa	

=== Family Colubridae ===
Species	Common name	Photo
Coluber hippocrepis	Horseshoe snake	
Coronella girondica	Southern smooth snake	
Dasypeltis sahelensis	Egg-eating snake	
Hemorrhois algirus intermedius	Algerian whip snake	
Lamprophis fuliginosus	Common African house snake	
Lytorhynchus diadema	Diadem sand-snake / common leaf-nosed snake / awl headed snake	
Macroprotodon cucullatus	Western false smooth snake	
Macroprotodon brevis	Hooded snake	
Malpolon insignitus	Eastern Montpellier snake	
Malpolon monspessulanus	Montpellier snake	
Natrix maura	Viperine snake	
Natrix natrix astreptophora	Ringed snake	
Psammophis schokari	Schokar sand-snake	
Scutophis moilensis	Moïla snake	
Spalerosophis diadema cliffordi	Clifford's diadem snake	
Spalerosophis dolichospilus	Mograbin diadem snake/long marked snake	
Telescopus tripolitanus	North African catsnake	

=== Family Elapidae ===
Species	Common name	Photo
Naja haje legionis	Egyptian cobra	

=== Family Leptotyphlopidae ===
Species	Common name	Photo
Leptotyphlops algeriensis	Beaked thread-snake	

=== Family Viperidae ===
Species	Common name	Photo
Bitis arietans	Puff adder	
Cerastes cerastes	Horned viper	
Cerastes vipera	Lesser cerastes	
Echis leucogaster	White-bellied carpet viper	
Daboia mauritanica	Moorish viper	
Vipera latastei gaditana	Lataste's viper	
Vipera monticola ^{[e]}	Mountain viper	

== Turtles ==
=== Family Cheloniidae ===
Species	Common name	Photo
Caretta caretta	Loggerhead sea turtle	
Chelonia mydas	Green sea turtle	
Eretmochelys imbricata	Hawksbill turtle	
Lepidochelys kempii	Kemps ridley sea turtle	
Lepidochelys olivacea	Olive ridley sea turtle	

=== Family Dermochelyidae ===
Species	Common name	Photo
Dermochelys coriacea	Leatherback/leathery turtle	

=== Family Emydidae ===
Species	Common name	Photo
Emys orbicularis occidentalis	European pond terrapin	
Mauremys leprosa leprosa	Spanish terrapin	
Mauremys leprosa saharica	Saharan pond turtle	

=== Family Testudinidae ===
Species	Common name	Photo
Testudo graeca graeca	Mediterranean spur-thighed tortoise	
Testudo graeca marokkensis	Morocco tortoise	
Testudo graeca soussensis	Souss valley tortoise	

== Worm lizards ==
=== Family Amphisbaenidae ===
Species	Common name	Photo
Blanus mettetali ^{[e]}	Moroccan worm lizard	
Blanus tingitanus ^{[e]}	Tangier worm lizard	

=== Family Trogonophidae ===
Species	Common name	Photo
Trogonophis wiegmanni wiegmanni	Sharp-tailed worm lizard	
Trogonophis wiegmanni elegans^{[e]}	Sharp-tailed worm lizard	
