= Morocco lizard-fingered gecko =

Animal set index article

There are two species of gecko named Morocco lizard-fingered gecko:

- Saurodactylus mauritanicus
- Saurodactylus brosseti
