= African wall gecko =

There are two species of lizard named African wall gecko:

- Tarentola ephippiata
- Tarentola hoggarensis
