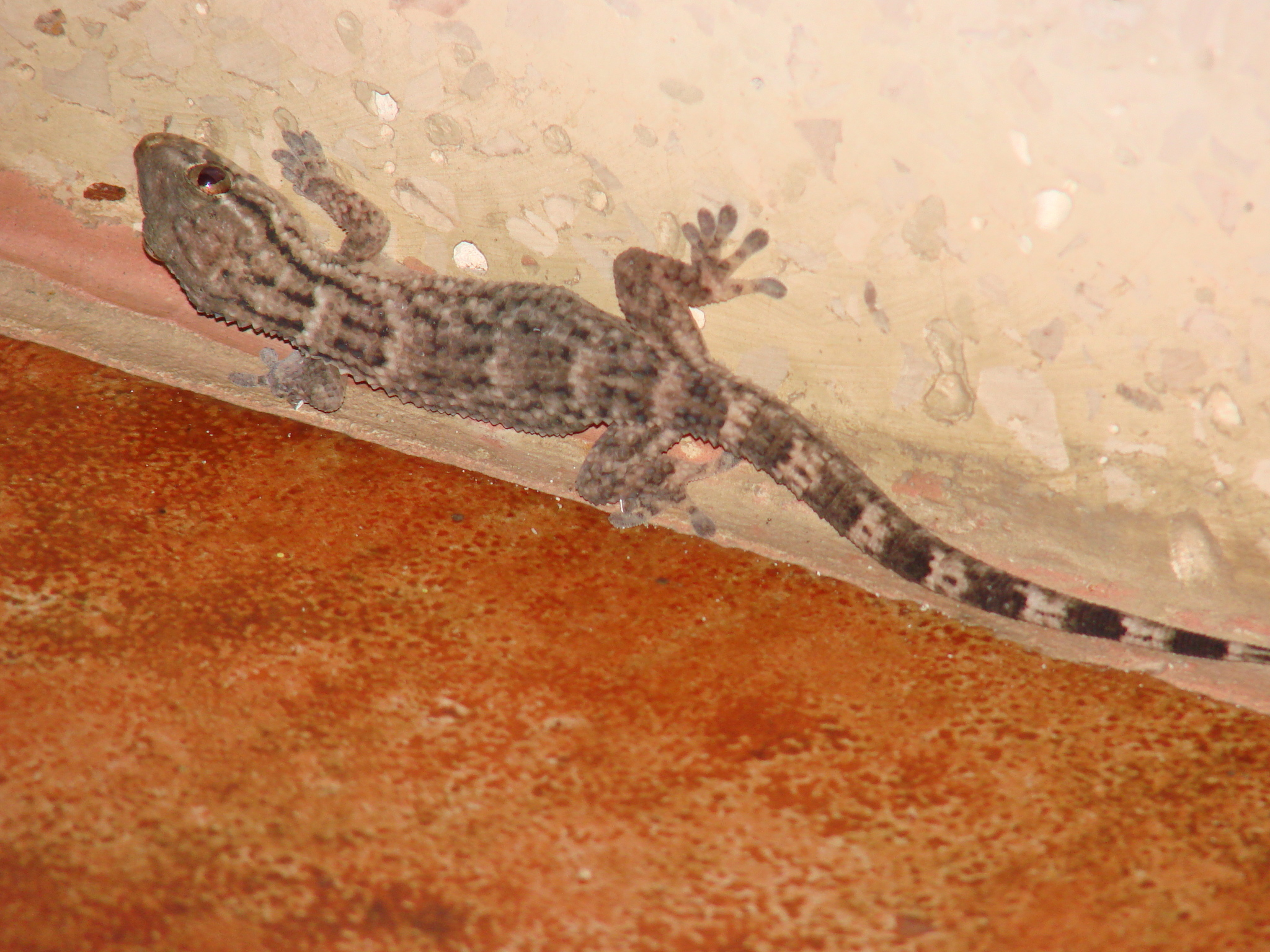

Conservation status
- Least Concern (IUCN 3.1)

Scientific classification
- Kingdom: Animalia
- Phylum: Chordata
- Class: Reptilia
- Order: Squamata
- Suborder: Gekkota
- Family: Phyllodactylidae
- Genus: Tarentola
- Species: T. americana

Binomial name
- Tarentola americana (Gray, 1831)

Synonyms
- Platydactylus americanus Gray, 1831; Platydactylus (Tarentola) americanus var. cubanus Gundlach & W. Peters, 1864; Tarentola americana — Boulenger, 1885; Tarentola cubana — Boulenger, 1885; Tarentola (Neotarentola) americana — Joger, 1984

= American wall gecko =

Species of lizard

The American wall gecko (Tarentola americana) is a species of lizard in the family Phyllodactylidae, endemic to Cuba and the Bahamas. There are two recognized subspecies.

== Subspecies ==
Including the nominotypical subspecies, two subspecies are recognized as valid.

- Tarentola americana americana (Gray, 1831)
- Tarentola american warreni Schwartz, 1968

Gray's trinomial authority in parentheses indicates he originally described T. a. americana in a different genus.

== Etymology ==
The subspecific name, warreni, is in honor of C. Rhea Warren, who collected the holotype.

== Geographic range ==
T. a. americana lives on the island of Cuba and associated islets. T. a. warreni lives on some of the northern islands of the Bahamas.

== Reproduction ==
T. americana is oviparous.
