= Anolis sheplani =

Conservation status
- Endangered (IUCN 3.1)

Scientific classification
- Kingdom: Animalia
- Phylum: Chordata
- Class: Reptilia
- Order: Squamata
- Suborder: Iguania
- Family: Dactyloidae
- Genus: Anolis
- Species: A. sheplani

Binomial name
- Anolis sheplani Schwartz, 1974

Species of lizard

Anolis sheplani, the Baoruco gray twig anole or Cabral anole, is a species of lizard in the family Dactyloidae. The species is endemic to the Dominican Republic. The specific name sheplani honors the collector Bruce R. Sheplan.
