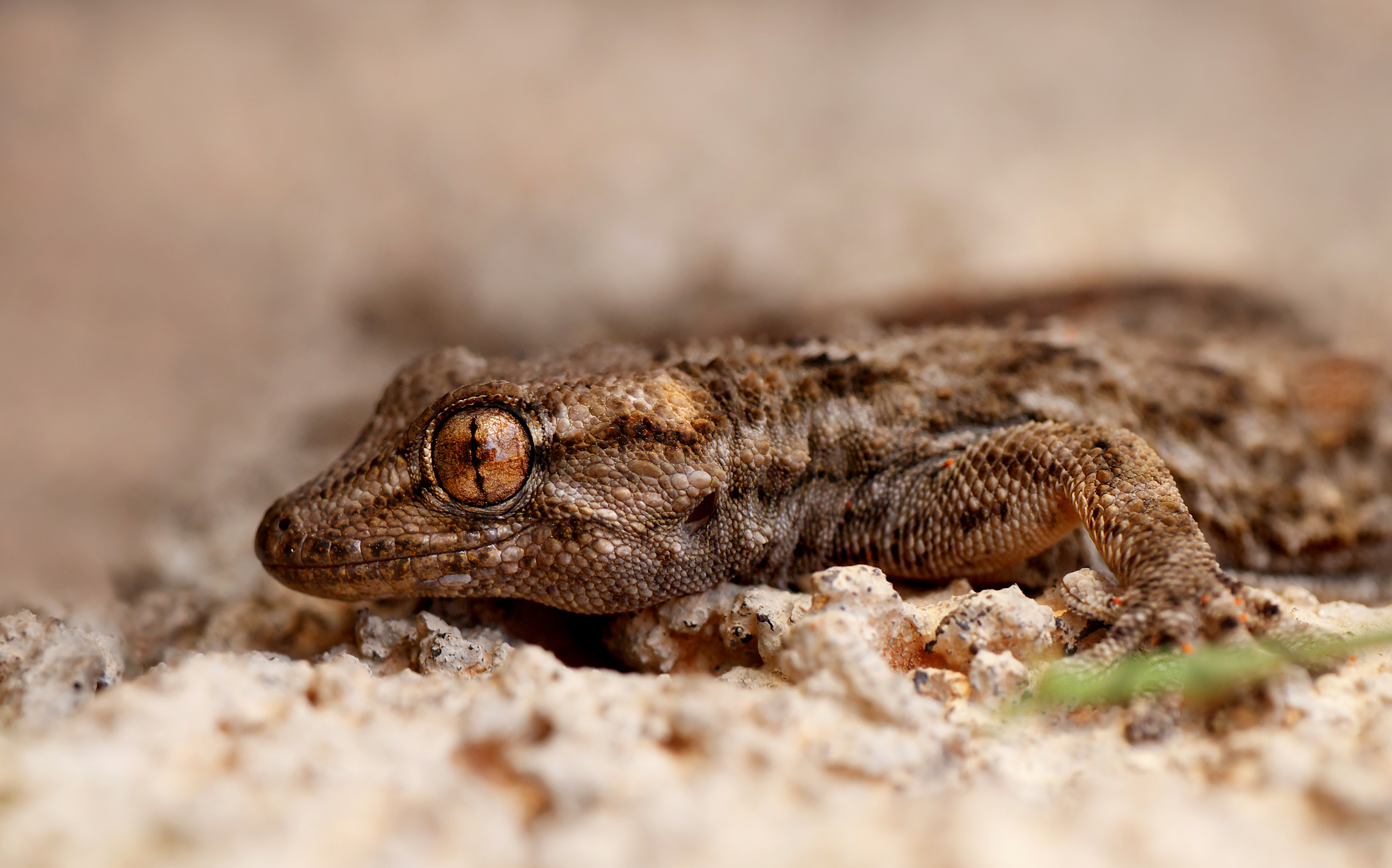

Conservation status
- Least Concern (IUCN 3.1)

Scientific classification
- Kingdom: Animalia
- Phylum: Chordata
- Class: Reptilia
- Order: Squamata
- Suborder: Gekkota
- Family: Phyllodactylidae
- Genus: Tarentola
- Species: T. angustimentalis

Binomial name
- Tarentola angustimentalis Steindachner, 1891

= East Canary gecko =

Species of lizard

The East Canary gecko or Canary wall gecko (Tarentola angustimentalis) is a species of lizard in the family Phyllodactylidae. It is endemic to the eastern Canary Islands. Its natural habitats are temperate shrubland, Mediterranean-type shrubby vegetation, rocky areas, rocky shores, sandy shores, intertidal marshes, arable land, pastureland, plantations, rural gardens, and urban areas.

== Description ==
The East Canary gecko can grow to about 8 cm (3 in) from the tip of its snout to its vent and has a tail of a similar length. It is a sturdy, plump gecko with a dorsally flattened head and body and short sideways projecting legs and resembles the Moorish gecko in general shape. The feet have adhesive pads all along the toes and these are widest at the tips. There are strong claws on the third and fourth digit of each foot. The skin is fairly smooth with small tubercles which are often multi-keeled. The eyes have vertical pupils in bright light and are brown or golden. The body colour is quite variable, being generally greyish-brown with a paler, sometimes intermittent, stripe along the spine and darker transverse bars. The underside is paler and sometimes tinged yellow, especially near the vent.

The East Canary gecko or Canary wall gecko is a species of lizard endemic to the eastern Canary Islands and often seen in Fuerteventura at night on outdoor walls and ceilings.

== Geographic range ==
The East Canary gecko is found on the Canary Islands of Fuerteventura, Lanzarote, Lobos and several small islands north of Lanzarote.

== Habitat ==
It is very common in a range of habitats up to an altitude of about 800 metres (2,600 ft). These include cliffs, screes, gullies, salt flats with scrubby vegetation, dunes, cultivated land and even inside houses.

== Biology ==
The diet of the East Canary gecko consists of insects, spiders and other small invertebrates.

== Reproduction ==
The male East Canary gecko is larger than the female and is territorial during the breeding season. It is quite vocal and has a range of calls. The female lays one or more clutches of two oval eggs about 1.2 centimetres (0.47 in) long, in cracks, under stones or buried in sand. They probably hatch in 2 to 3 months and the baby geckos that emerge are 2 to 3 centimetres (0.79 to 1.18 in) long from snout to vent. Their colouring is rather more vivid than that of the adults. Females mature at about 6 centimetres (2.4 in) long, and they have been known to live for 17 years in captivity. Research has shown that the sex of the embryo is determined by the temperature at which the egg is incubated. If this is 27 °C (81 °F) or above the resulting offspring will be female but at lower temperatures it will be male.

== Conservation status ==
The East Canary gecko is listed as being of "least concern" in the IUCN Red List of Threatened Species. This is because, although the range is very limited, it is common in many parts of that range, its habitats are not threatened and the population does not seem to be declining.
