= Geckobia estherae =

Scientific classification
- Kingdom: Animalia
- Phylum: Arthropoda
- Subphylum: Chelicerata
- Class: Arachnida
- Order: Trombidiformes
- Family: Pterygosomatidae
- Genus: Geckobia
- Species: G. estherae

Binomial name
- Geckobia estherae Bertrand, Pfliegler & Sciberras, 2012

Species of mite

Geckobia estherae, or Esther's gecko mite, is a species of external parasite from the genus Gekobia and is endemic to the Maltese Islands. Very little is known about it except that its preferred (if not only) host is the local indigenous Moorish gecko Tarentola mauritanica and its preferred part of the body of its host seems to be the forehead. The species was named in honour of Esther Sciberras for her continuous assistance to the finder (Arnold Sciberras) in the study of the natural history.
