= Tarentola rudis =

Conservation status
- Data Deficient (IUCN 3.1)

Scientific classification
- Kingdom: Animalia
- Phylum: Chordata
- Class: Reptilia
- Order: Squamata
- Suborder: Gekkota
- Family: Phyllodactylidae
- Genus: Tarentola
- Species: T. rudis

Binomial name
- Tarentola rudis Boulenger, 1906

Synonyms
- Tarentola delalandii var. rudis Boulenger, 1906

Species of lizard

Tarentola rudis is a species of geckos in the family Phyllodactylidae. The species is endemic to Cape Verde, where it occurs in the southern part of the island of Santiago and on the Ilhéu de Santa Maria. The species was described as a variety of Tarentola delalandii by George Albert Boulenger in 1906 based on several specimens collected by Leonardo Fea.

== Taxonomy ==
The following former subspecies were elevated to species status in 2012:

- Tarentola rudis boavistensis: Tarentola boavistensis
- Tarentola rudis maioensis: Tarentola maioensis
- Tarentola rudis protogigas: Tarentola protogigas

The subspecies Tarentola rudis hartogi became a subspecies of Tarentola protogigas as Tarentolas protogigas hartogi.
