= Anolis aurifer =

Scientific classification
- Kingdom: Animalia
- Phylum: Chordata
- Class: Reptilia
- Order: Squamata
- Suborder: Iguania
- Family: Dactyloidae
- Genus: Anolis
- Species: A. aurifer

Binomial name
- Anolis aurifer Schwartz, 1968

Species of lizard

Anolis aurifer is a species of lizard in the family Dactyloidae. The species is found in Hispaniola.
