= Cape Verde wall gecko =

Tarentola caboverdiana

Conservation status
- Least Concern (IUCN 3.1)

Scientific classification
- Kingdom: Animalia
- Phylum: Chordata
- Class: Reptilia
- Order: Squamata
- Suborder: Gekkota
- Family: Phyllodactylidae
- Genus: Tarentola
- Species: T. caboverdiana

Binomial name
- Tarentola caboverdiana Schleich, 1984

Species of lizard

Cape Verde wall gecko, also Santo Antão wall gecko, (Tarentola caboverdiana) is a species of geckos in the family Phyllodactylidae. The species is endemic to Cape Verde, where it occurs in the island of Santo Antão. The species was named by Hans Hermann Schleich in 1984. The specific name caboverdiana refers to Cape Verde, the type locality. This species activity pattern is strictly nocturnal in their habitat.

== Taxonomy ==
The former subspecies Tarentola caboverdiana substituta, Tarentola caboverdiana nicolauensis and Tarentola caboverdiana raziana have been elevated to separate species status by Vasconcelos, Perera, Geniez, Harris & Carranza in 2012.
