= Saurodactylus harrisii =

Scientific classification
- Kingdom: Animalia
- Phylum: Chordata
- Class: Reptilia
- Order: Squamata
- Suborder: Gekkota
- Family: Sphaerodactylidae
- Genus: Saurodactylus
- Species: S. harrisii

Binomial name
- Saurodactylus harrisii Javanmardi, Vogler & Joger, 2019

Species of lizard

Saurodactylus harrisii is a species of gecko in the family Sphaerodactylidae. It is found in Morocco between the Sous River and Boujdour (Western Sahara, administered by Morocco). Common name Harris's lizard-fingered gecko has been coined for it.

Saurodactylus harrisii in the type series measure 17–29 mm (0.7–1.1 in) in snout–vent length.
