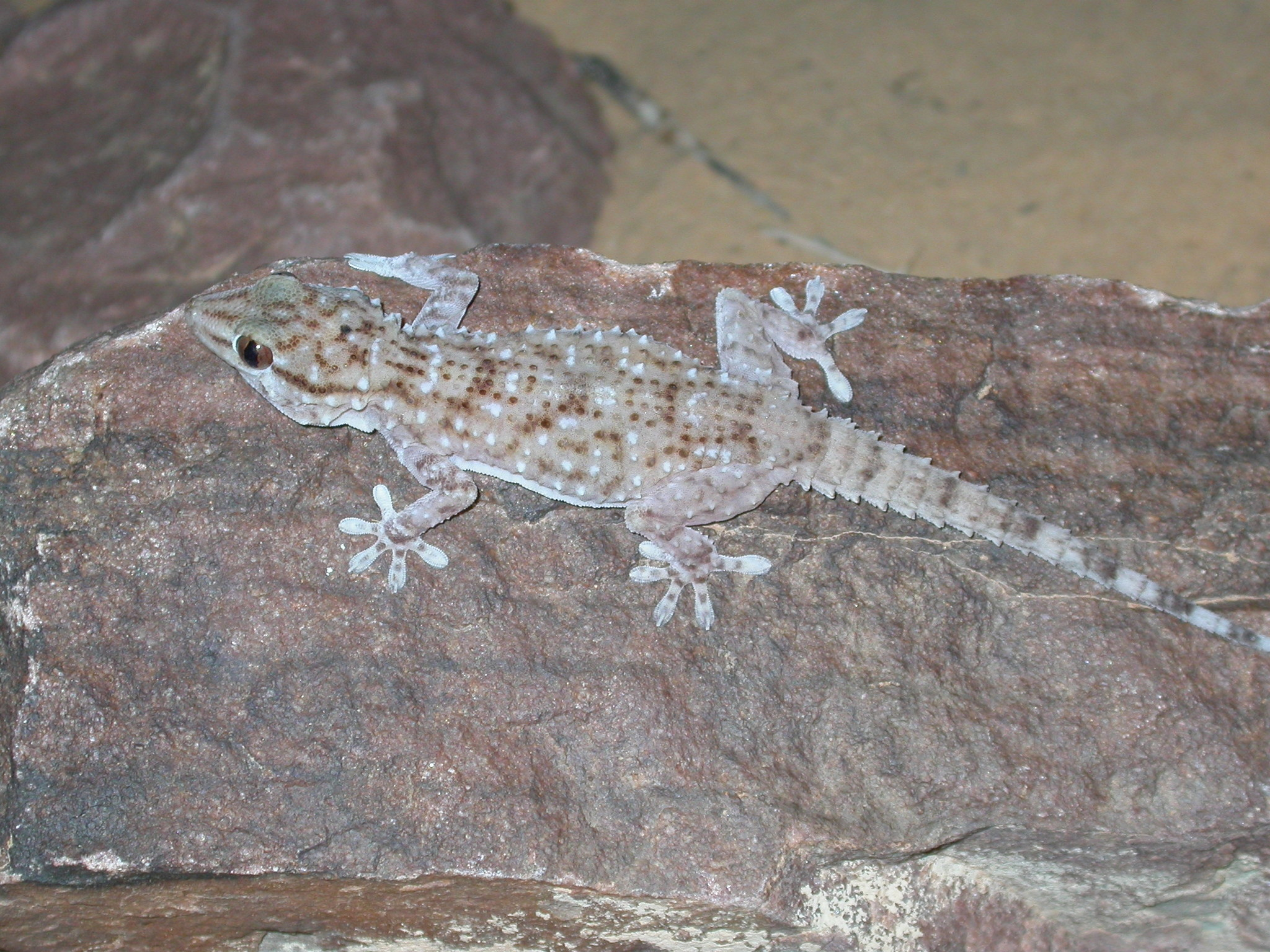

Conservation status
- Least Concern (IUCN 3.1)

Scientific classification
- Kingdom: Animalia
- Phylum: Chordata
- Class: Reptilia
- Order: Squamata
- Suborder: Gekkota
- Family: Phyllodactylidae
- Genus: Tarentola
- Species: T. parvicarinata

Binomial name
- Tarentola parvicarinata Joger, 1980

= Tarentola parvicarinata =

Species of lizard

Tarentola parvicarinata, also known as the Sierra Leone wall gecko or white-spotted wall gecko, is a species of gecko. It is native to parts of West Africa (Burkina Faso, Gambia, Guinea, Mali, Mauritania, and Senegal) and Western Sahara.
