= Tarentola panousei =

Scientific classification
- Kingdom: Animalia
- Phylum: Chordata
- Class: Reptilia
- Order: Squamata
- Suborder: Gekkota
- Family: Phyllodactylidae
- Genus: Tarentola
- Species: T. panousei

Binomial name
- Tarentola panousei Pasteur, 1959

Species of lizard

Tarentola panousei is a species of gecko. It is native to Morocco, Mauritania, and Western Sahara.
