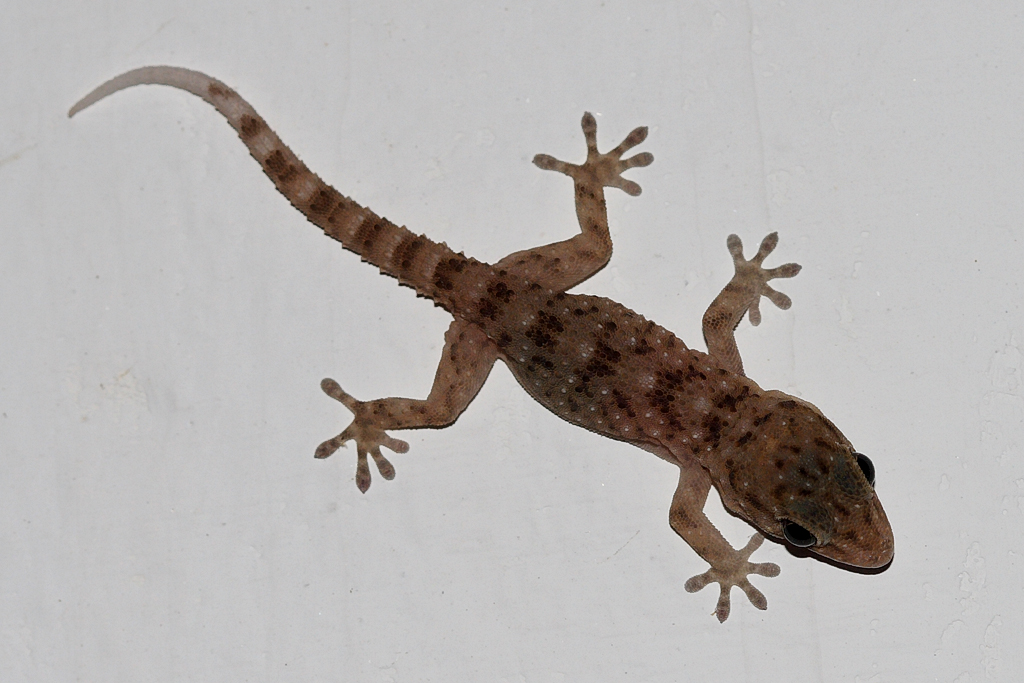

Conservation status
- Least Concern (IUCN 3.1)

Scientific classification
- Kingdom: Animalia
- Phylum: Chordata
- Class: Reptilia
- Order: Squamata
- Suborder: Gekkota
- Family: Phyllodactylidae
- Genus: Tarentola
- Species: T. gomerensis

Binomial name
- Tarentola gomerensis Joger & Bischoff, 1983

= Gomero wall gecko =

Species of lizard

The Gomero wall gecko or La Gomera gecko (Tarentola gomerensis), also known as perenquén in the Canary Islands, is a species of lizard in the family Phyllodactylidae. It is endemic to La Gomera.

Its natural habitats are temperate shrubland, Mediterranean-type shrubby vegetation, rocky areas, rocky shores, pastureland, plantations, rural gardens, and urban areas.
