= Geckobia =

Scientific classification
- Kingdom: Animalia
- Phylum: Arthropoda
- Subphylum: Chelicerata
- Class: Arachnida
- Order: Trombidiformes
- Family: Pterygosomatidae
- Genus: Geckobia; Mégnin, 1878

Species
- See text

Genus of parasitic mite

Geckobia is a genus of parasitic mites in the family Pterygosomatidae.

== Species ==
Selected species include:

- Geckobia bataviensis
- Geckobia estherae
- Geckobia glebosum
- Geckobia nitidus
- Geckobia zapallarensis
