= Tarentola protogigas =

Conservation status
- Least Concern (IUCN 3.1)

Scientific classification
- Kingdom: Animalia
- Phylum: Chordata
- Class: Reptilia
- Order: Squamata
- Suborder: Gekkota
- Family: Phyllodactylidae
- Genus: Tarentola
- Species: T. protogigas

Binomial name
- Tarentola protogigas Joger, 1984

Subspecies
- Tarentola protogigas hartogi Joger, 1993; Tarentola protogigas protogigas Joger, 1984

Species of lizard

Tarentola protogigas is a species of geckos in the family Phyllodactylidae. The species is endemic to Cape Verde, where it is found on the islands Fogo, Brava and the smaller Ilhéus Secos The species was named by Ulrich Joger in 1984.

== Taxonomy ==
Previously a subspecies Tarentola rudis protogigas, it was elevated to species status in 2012. Also, Tarentola rudis hartogi was placed under this species as Tarentola protogigas hartogi.

=== Subspecies ===
The following subspecies are recognised:

- Tarentola protogigas hartogi Joger, 1993 - Brava and Ilhéus Secos
- Tarentola protogigas protogigas Joger, 1984 - Fogo
