= Raso wall gecko =

Conservation status
- Near Threatened (IUCN 3.1)

Scientific classification
- Kingdom: Animalia
- Phylum: Chordata
- Class: Reptilia
- Order: Squamata
- Suborder: Gekkota
- Family: Phyllodactylidae
- Genus: Tarentola
- Species: T. raziana

Binomial name
- Tarentola raziana Schleich (1984)

Species of lizard

The Raso wall gecko (Tarentola raziana) is a species of geckos in the family Phyllodactylidae. The species is endemic to Cape Verde, where it occurs on the island of Santa Luzia and the islets of Branco and Raso. The species was named by Hans Hermann Schleich in 1984. The specific name raziana refers to the islet Raso where it is found.

== Taxonomy ==
Previously a subspecies Tarentola caboverdiana raziana, it was elevated to species status in 2012.
