= Tarentola fascicularis =

- in Faiyum, Egypt

Scientific classification
- Kingdom: Animalia
- Phylum: Chordata
- Class: Reptilia
- Order: Squamata
- Suborder: Gekkota
- Family: Phyllodactylidae
- Genus: Tarentola
- Species: T. fascicularis

Binomial name
- Tarentola fascicularis (Daudin, 1802)

Synonyms
- Gecko fascicularis

Species of lizard

Tarentola fascicularis, also known as Wolfgang's wall gecko or Moorish gecko, is a species of gecko. It is native to northern Africa (Tunisia, Libya, and Egypt).
