= Algerian wall gecko =

Algerian Wall Gecko

Conservation status
- Least Concern (IUCN 3.1)

Scientific classification
- Kingdom: Animalia
- Phylum: Chordata
- Class: Reptilia
- Order: Squamata
- Suborder: Gekkota
- Family: Phyllodactylidae
- Genus: Tarentola
- Species: T. neglecta

Binomial name
- Tarentola neglecta Strauch, 1887

Species of lizard

The Algerian wall gecko (Tarentola neglecta) is a species of lizard in the family Phyllodactylidae. It is found in Algeria, Tunisia, and Libya. This gecko lives in vegetation in dry areas such as deserts. It has also been found in abandoned buildings. It is locally common with no major threats.
