= Tarentola senegambiae =

Conservation status
- Least Concern (IUCN 3.1)

Scientific classification
- Kingdom: Animalia
- Phylum: Chordata
- Class: Reptilia
- Order: Squamata
- Suborder: Gekkota
- Family: Phyllodactylidae
- Genus: Tarentola
- Species: T. senegambiae

Binomial name
- Tarentola senegambiae Joger, 1984

Species of lizard

Tarentola senegambiae is a species of gecko found in northern Africa.
