= São Nicolau wall gecko =

Conservation status
- Least Concern (IUCN 3.1)

Scientific classification
- Kingdom: Animalia
- Phylum: Chordata
- Class: Reptilia
- Order: Squamata
- Suborder: Gekkota
- Family: Phyllodactylidae
- Genus: Tarentola
- Species: T. substituta

Binomial name
- Tarentola substituta Schleich (1984)

Species of lizard

The São Nicolau wall gecko (Tarentola nicolauensis) is a species of geckos in the family Phyllodactylidae. The species is endemic to Cape Verde, where it occurs on the islands of São Vicente and São Nicolau. The species was named by Hans Hermann Schleich in 1984.

== Taxonomy ==
Previously a subspecies Tarentola caboverdiana nicolauensis, it was elevated to species status in 2012.
