= Darwin's wall gecko =

Tarentola darwini

Conservation status
- Least Concern (IUCN 3.1)

Scientific classification
- Kingdom: Animalia
- Phylum: Chordata
- Class: Reptilia
- Order: Squamata
- Suborder: Gekkota
- Family: Phyllodactylidae
- Genus: Tarentola
- Species: T. darwini

Binomial name
- Tarentola darwini Joger, 1984

Species of lizard

Darwin's wall gecko (Tarentola darwini) is a species of lizard in the family Phyllodactylidae. The species is endemic to Cape Verde, where it occurs on the islands of São Nicolau, Sal, Santiago, and Fogo.

== Taxonomy and etymology ==
T. darwini was described and named by German herpetologist Ulrich Joger in 1984. The specific name darwini refers to English naturalist Charles Darwin, who visited the island of Santiago in 1832.

== Habitat ==
The preferred natural habitat of T. darwini is arid, rocky areas at low altitudes.

== Description ==
Adults of T. darwini usually have a snout-to-vent length (SVL) of about 5.5 cm (2.2 in). The maximum recorded SVL is 6.4 cm (2.5 in).

== Reproduction ==
T. darwini is oviparous.
