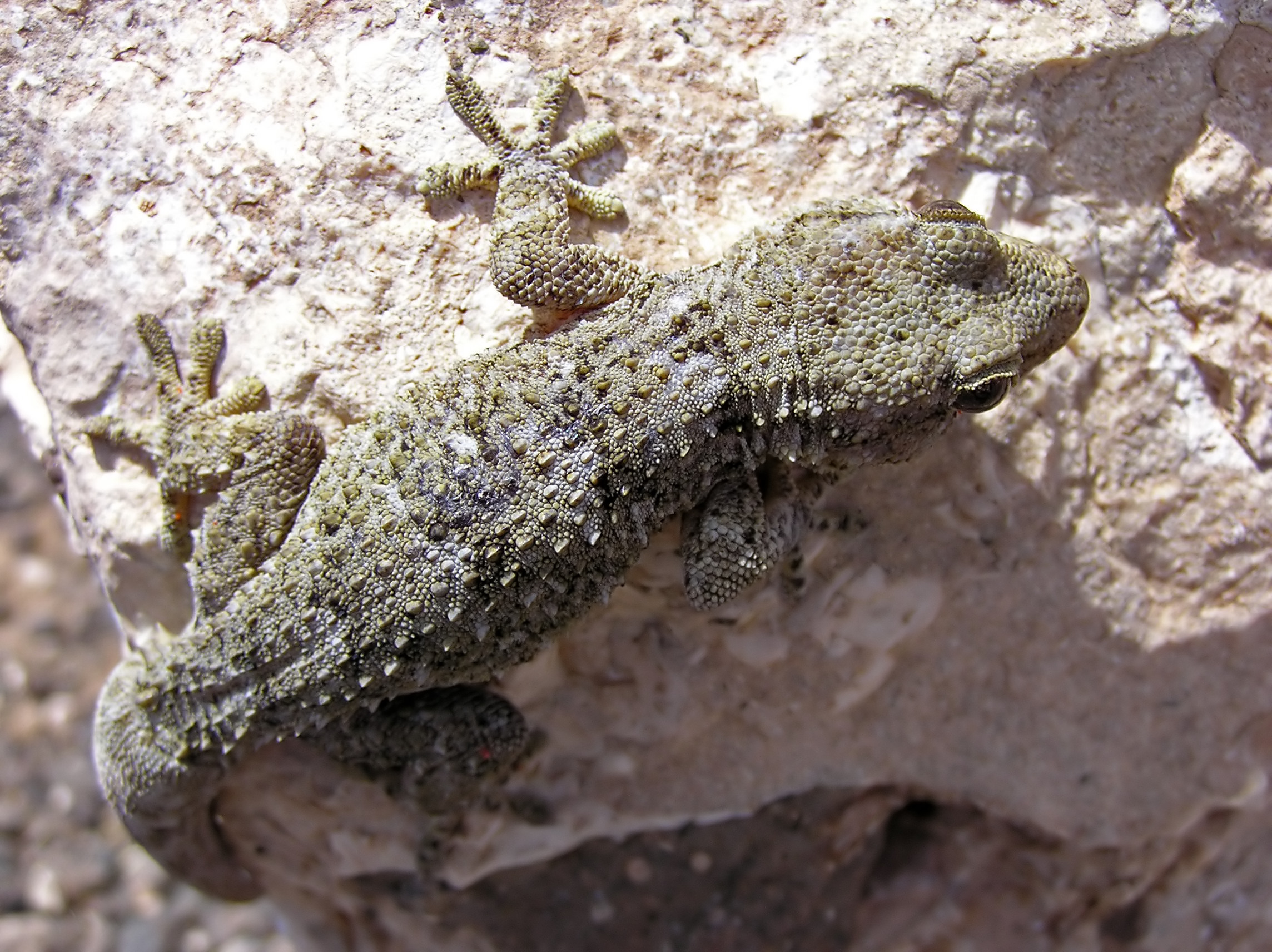

Conservation status
- Least Concern (IUCN 3.1)

Scientific classification
- Kingdom: Animalia
- Phylum: Chordata
- Class: Reptilia
- Order: Squamata
- Suborder: Gekkota
- Family: Phyllodactylidae
- Genus: Tarentola
- Species: T. boettgeri

Binomial name
- Tarentola boettgeri Steindachner, 1891

= Boettger's wall gecko =

Species of lizard

Boettger's wall gecko (Tarentola boettgeri), also commonly known as the Gran Canaria gecko, is a species of lizard in the family Phyllodactylidae. The species is native to the Canary Islands and the Savage Islands. There are three recognized subspecies.

== Etymology ==
The specific name, boettgeri, is in honor of German herpetologist Oskar Boettger. The subspecific name, bischoffi, is in honor of German herpetologist Wolfgang Bischoff.

== Geographic range ==
T. boettgeri is native to the islands of Gran Canaria (T. b. boettgeri) and El Hierro (T. b. hierrensis) in the Canary Islands. An introduced population exists in Galicia, Spain. The subspecies T. b. bischoffi is indigenous to the Savage Islands.

== Habitat ==
The preferred habitats of T. boettgeri are shrubby vegetation, rocky areas, rocky shores, and rural gardens.

== Reproduction ==
T. boettgeri is oviparous.

== Subspecies ==
The following three subspecies are recognized as being valid, including the nominotypical subspecies.. However, these subspecies do not correctly reflect the pattern of genomic variation within the species (see Brown et al., 2025).

- Tarentola boettgeri bischoffi Joger, 1984
- Tarentola boettgeri boettgeri Steindachner, 1891
- Tarentola boettgeri hierrensis Joger & Bischoff, 1983
