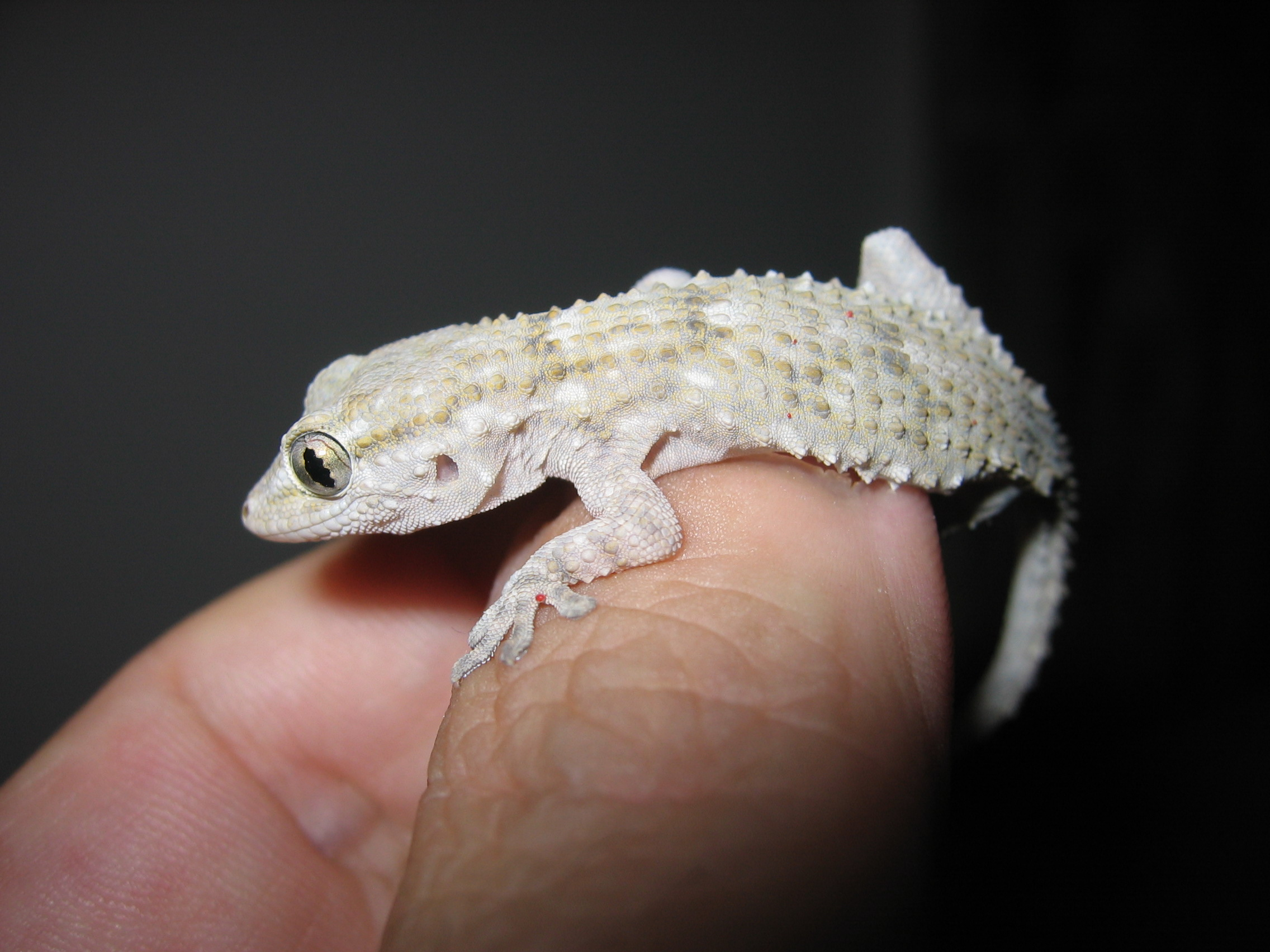
- Tarentola mauritanica

Scientific classification
- Kingdom: Animalia
- Phylum: Chordata
- Class: Reptilia
- Order: Squamata
- Suborder: Gekkota
- Family: Phyllodactylidae
- Genus: Tarentola; Gray, 1825

= Tarentola =

Genus of lizards

Tarentola is a genus of geckos, commonly known as wall geckos.

They are native to lands on both sides of the Atlantic Ocean; on the western side they can be found in the West Indies, while on the eastern side they can be found in mainland Africa, Macaronesia, and the Mediterranean region. However, some species such as T. mauritanica have been introduced worldwide.

== Classification of genus Tarentola ==
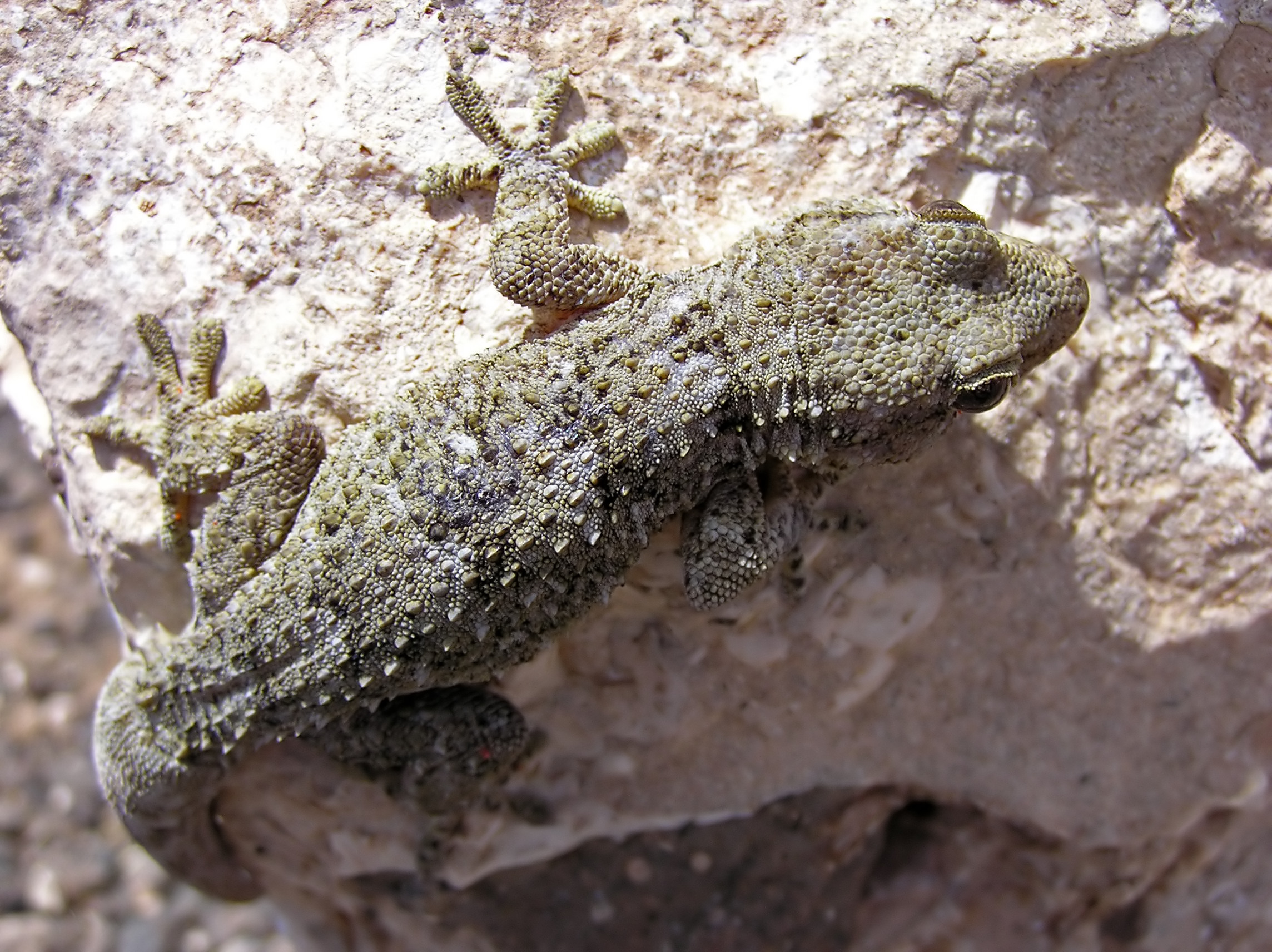
Tarentola sp., probably T. boettgeri.

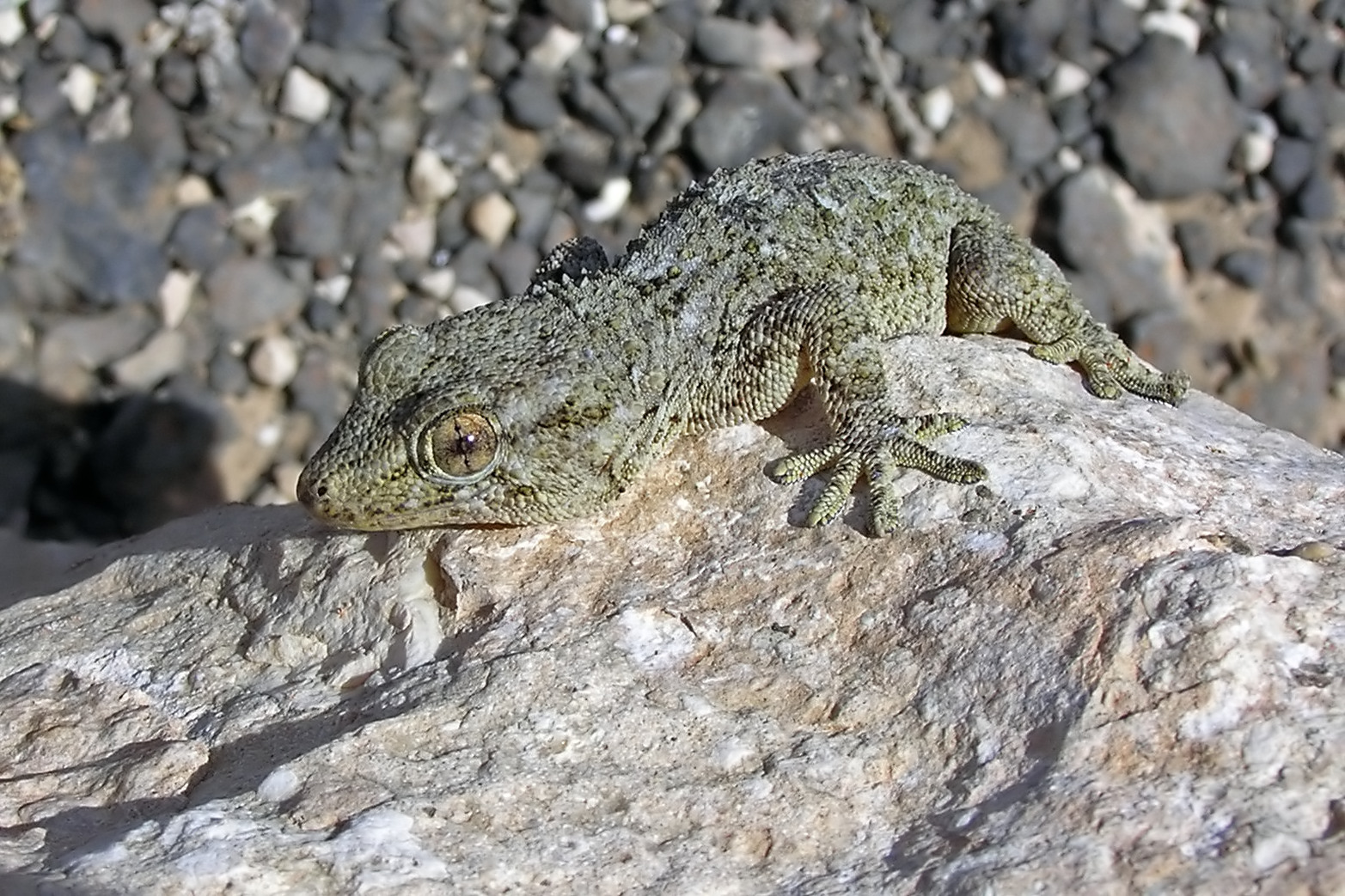
Tarentola sp., probably T. boettgeri.

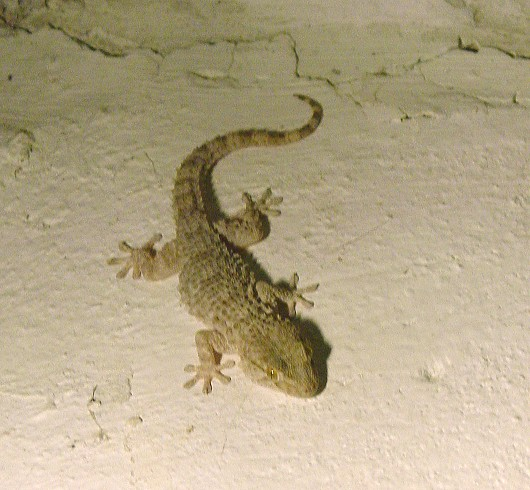
Tarentola mauritanica.

The following species and subspecies are recognized as being valid.

- Tarentola albertschwartzi Sprackland & Swinney, 1998 – Jamaican giant gecko (possibly extinct)
- Tarentola americana (Gray, 1831) – American wall gecko
  - Tarentola americana americana (Gray, 1831)
  - Tarentola americana warreni Schwartz, 1968 – Warren's American wall gecko
- Tarentola angustimentalis Steindachner, 1891 – Canary wall gecko
- Tarentola annularis (É. Geoffroy Saint-Hilaire, 1827) – ringed wall gecko
  - Tarentola annularis annularis (É. Geoffroy Saint-Hilaire, 1827)
  - Tarentola annularis relicta Joger, 1984
- Tarentola boavistensis Joger, 1993 – Boavista wall gecko
- Tarentola bocagei Vasconcelos, Perera, Geniez, Harris & Carranza, 2012 – Bocage's wall gecko
- Tarentola boehmei Joger, 1984 – Morocco wall gecko
- Tarentola boettgeri Steindachner, 1891 – Boettger's wall gecko
  - Tarentola boettgeri boettgeri Steindachner, 1891
  - Tarentola boettgeri bischoffi Joger, 1984
  - Tarentola boettgeri hierrensis Joger & Bischoff, 1983
- Tarentola caboverdiana Schleich, 1984 – Cape Verde wall gecko
- Tarentola chazaliae (Mocquard, 1895) – helmethead gecko
- Tarentola crombiei Díaz & Hedges, 2008 – Crombie's wall gecko
- Tarentola darwini Joger, 1984 – Darwin's wall gecko
- Tarentola delalandii (A.M.C. Duméril & Bibron, 1836) – Tenerife wall gecko
- Tarentola deserti Boulenger, 1891 – desert wall gecko
- Tarentola ephippiata O'Shaughnessy, 1875 – African wall gecko
  - Tarentola ephippiata ephippiata O'Shaughnessy, 1875
  - Tarentola ephippiata nikolausi Joger, 1984
- Tarentola fascicularis (Daudin, 1802) – Wolfgang's wall gecko, moorish gecko
- Tarentola fogoensis Vasconcelos, Perera, Geniez, Harris & Carranza, 2012 – Fogo wall gecko
- Tarentola gigas (Bocage, 1875) – giant wall gecko
  - Tarentola gigas brancoensis Schleich, 1984
  - Tarentola gigas gigas (Bocage, 1875)
- Tarentola gomerensis Joger & Bischoff, 1983 – Gomera wall gecko
- Tarentola hoggarensis F. Werner, 1937 – African wall gecko
- Tarentola maioensis Schleich, 1984 – Maio wall gecko
- Tarentola mauritanica (Linnaeus, 1758) – moorish gecko
  - Tarentola mauritanica juliae Joger, 1984
  - Tarentola mauritanica mauritanica (Linnaeus, 1758)
  - Tarentola mauritanica pallida Geniez et al., 1999
- Tarentola mindiae S. Baha El Din, 1997 – Qattara gecko
- Tarentola neglecta Strauch, 1887 – Algerian wall gecko
  - Tarentola neglecta geyri Joger, 1984
  - Tarentola neglecta lanzai Bshaena & Joger, 2013
  - Tarentola neglecta neglecta Strauch, 1887
- Tarentola nicolauensis Schleich, 1984 – São Nicolau wall gecko
- Tarentola panousei Pasteur, 1959
- Tarentola parvicarinata Joger, 1980 – Sierra Leone wall gecko
- Tarentola pastoria J.-F. Trape, S. Trape & Chirio, 2012
- Tarentola protogigas Joger, 1984
  - Tarentola protogigas hartogi Joger, 1993
  - Tarentola protogigas protogigas Joger, 1984
- Tarentola raziana Schleich, 1984 – Raso wall gecko
- Tarentola rudis Boulenger, 1906
- Tarentola senegambiae Joger, 1984
- Tarentola substituta Joger, 1984 – São Vicente wall gecko

Nota bene: A binomial authority or a trinomial authority in parentheses indicates that the species or subspecies was originally described in a genus other than Tarentola.
