= São Vicente wall gecko =

Conservation status
- Least Concern (IUCN 3.1)

Scientific classification
- Kingdom: Animalia
- Phylum: Chordata
- Class: Reptilia
- Order: Squamata
- Suborder: Gekkota
- Family: Phyllodactylidae
- Genus: Tarentola
- Species: T. substituta

Binomial name
- Tarentola substituta Joger (1984)

Species of lizard

The São Vicente wall gecko (Tarentola substituta) is a species of geckos in the family Phyllodactylidae. The species is endemic to Cape Verde, where it occurs on the islands of São Vicente and Santo Antão, where it may have been introduced.

== Taxonomy ==
Previously a subspecies Tarentola caboverdiana substituta, it was elevated to species status in 2012.
