= Bocage's wall gecko =

Conservation status
- Least Concern (IUCN 3.1)

Scientific classification
- Kingdom: Animalia
- Phylum: Chordata
- Class: Reptilia
- Order: Squamata
- Suborder: Gekkota
- Family: Phyllodactylidae
- Genus: Tarentola
- Species: T. bocagei

Binomial name
- Tarentola bocagei Vasconcelos, Perera, Geniez, Harris, Carranza, 2012

Species of lizard

Bocage's wall gecko (Tarentola bocagei) is a species of geckos in the family Phyllodactylidae. The species is endemic to Cape Verde, where it occurs in the island of São Nicolau. The species was first described and named in 2012. The type locality is Carriçal, in the eastern part of São Nicolau. The species is listed as least-concern species by the IUCN.

== Etymology ==
The specific name bocagei refers to naturalist José Vicente Barbosa du Bocage.
