= Crombie's wall gecko =

Conservation status
- Least Concern (IUCN 3.1)

Scientific classification
- Kingdom: Animalia
- Phylum: Chordata
- Class: Reptilia
- Order: Squamata
- Suborder: Gekkota
- Family: Phyllodactylidae
- Genus: Tarentola
- Species: T. crombiei

Binomial name
- Tarentola crombiei Díaz & Hedges, 2008

Species of lizard

Crombie's wall gecko (Tarentola crombiei), also known commonly as the Oriente tuberculate gecko, is a species of lizard in the family Phyllodactylidae. The species is endemic to Cuba.

== Etymology ==
The specific name, crombiei, is in honor of American herpetologist Ronald Ian Crombie.

== Geographic range ==
T. crombiei is found along the southeastern coast of Cuba in Granma Province, Guantánamo Province, and Santiago de Cuba Province.

== Habitat ==
The preferred natural habitat of T. crombiei is dry forest.

== Description ==
T. crombiei is small for its genus, with a maximum recorded snout-to-vent length (SVL) of 57.8 mm (2.28 in).

== Diet ==
T. crombiei preys upon insects.

== Reproduction ==
T. crombiei is oviparous. Clutch size is only one egg, which is fusiform and nonadhesive.
