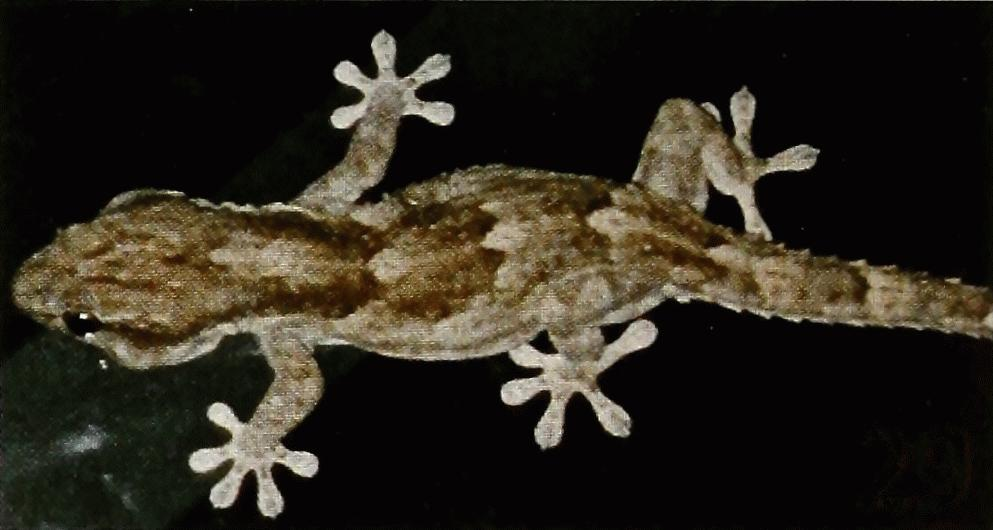

Scientific classification
- Domain: Eukaryota
- Kingdom: Animalia
- Phylum: Chordata
- Class: Reptilia
- Order: Squamata
- Infraorder: Gekkota
- Family: Phyllodactylidae
- Genus: Tarentola
- Species: T. ephippiata

Binomial name
- Tarentola ephippiata O’Shaughnessy, 1875

= Tarentola ephippiata =

African wall gecko

Species of lizard

The African wall gecko, or fig tree gecko (Tarentola ephippiata) is a species of gecko. It is found in northern Africa and parts of North America.

== Description ==
The African Wall Gecko lives primarily in Afrotropic regions, though it has been found in parts of North America. It is nocturnal.

== Discovery ==
It was first believed that Tarentola ephippiata and Tarentola annularis (white-spotted wall gecko or ringed wall gecko), were geographic variants of the same species. A morphological analysis in 1961 showed that they were two distinct species, with differences in number of teeth and dorsal patterns. In 2019, the gecko was spotted in North America for the first time.
