= Fogo wall gecko =

Conservation status
- Least Concern (IUCN 3.1)

Scientific classification
- Kingdom: Animalia
- Phylum: Chordata
- Class: Reptilia
- Order: Squamata
- Suborder: Gekkota
- Family: Phyllodactylidae
- Genus: Tarentola
- Species: T. fogoensis

Binomial name
- Tarentola fogoensis Vasconcelos, Perera, Geniez, Harris, Carranza, 2012

Species of lizard

The Fogo wall gecko (Tarentola fogoensis) is a species of geckos in the family Phyllodactylidae. The species is endemic to Cape Verde, where it is found on the island of Fogo. The species was first described and named in 2012.

== Etymology ==
The specific name fogoensis refers to the island where it occurs, Fogo.
