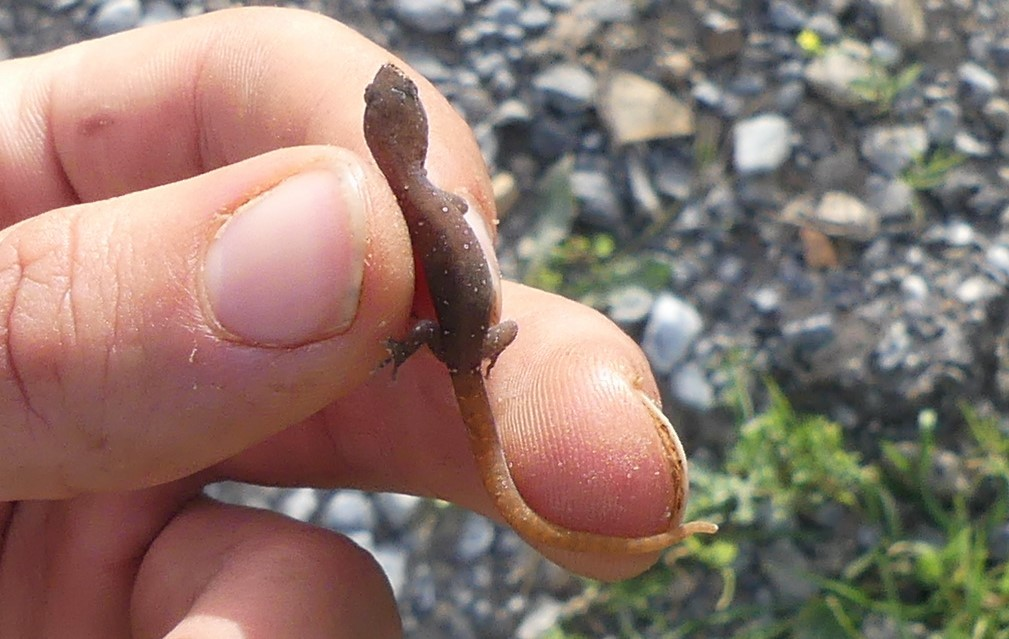

Conservation status
- Vulnerable (IUCN 3.1)

Scientific classification
- Kingdom: Animalia
- Phylum: Chordata
- Class: Reptilia
- Order: Squamata
- Suborder: Gekkota
- Family: Sphaerodactylidae
- Genus: Saurodactylus
- Species: S. fasciatus

Binomial name
- Saurodactylus fasciatus Werner, 1931

= Saurodactylus fasciatus =

Species of lizard

Saurodactylus fasciatus, also known as the banded-toed gecko or banded lizard-fingered gecko, is a species of lizards in the family Gekkonidae endemic to Morocco.

Its natural habitats are temperate forests, Mediterranean-type shrubby vegetation, rocky areas, arable land, and pastureland. It is threatened by habitat loss.
