= Tarentola pastoria =

Conservation status
- Least Concern (IUCN 3.1)

Scientific classification
- Kingdom: Animalia
- Phylum: Chordata
- Class: Reptilia
- Order: Squamata
- Suborder: Gekkota
- Family: Phyllodactylidae
- Genus: Tarentola
- Species: T. pastoria

Binomial name
- Tarentola pastoria J.-F. Trape, S. Trape & Chirio, 2012

Species of lizard

Tarentola pastoria is a species of gecko, a lizard in the family Phyllodactylidae. It is native to Guinea and adjacent northern Sierra Leone.
