= Jamaican giant gecko =

Conservation status
- Data Deficient (IUCN 3.1)

Scientific classification
- Kingdom: Animalia
- Phylum: Chordata
- Class: Reptilia
- Order: Squamata
- Suborder: Gekkota
- Family: Phyllodactylidae
- Genus: Tarentola
- Species: T. albertschwartzi

Binomial name
- Tarentola albertschwartzi Sprackland & Swinney, 1998

Synonyms
- Tarentola albertschwartzi Sprackland & Swinney, 1998; Tarentola (Neotarentola) albertschwartzi — Rösler, 2000; Tarentola albertschwartzi — B. Wilson, 2011

Species of lizard

The Jamaican giant gecko (Tarentola albertschwartzi), also known commonly as Schwartz's wall gecko, is a species of lizard in the family Phyllodactylidae. The species is endemic to Jamaica.

== Etymology ==
The specific name, albertschwartzi, is in honor of American herpetologist Albert Schwartz.

== Taxonomy ==
T. albertschwartzi is only known from a single specimen uncovered in the late 1990s in a museum in Scotland; this specimen was entered into the collection in 1884 and labelled as from Jamaica. The species is possibly extinct.
