= Maio wall gecko =

Conservation status
- Least Concern (IUCN 3.1)

Scientific classification
- Kingdom: Animalia
- Phylum: Chordata
- Class: Reptilia
- Order: Squamata
- Suborder: Gekkota
- Family: Phyllodactylidae
- Genus: Tarentola
- Species: T. maioensis

Binomial name
- Tarentola maioensis Schleich (1984)

Species of lizard

The Maio wall gecko (Tarentola maioensis) is a species of geckos in the family Phyllodactylidae. The species is endemic to Cape Verde, where it occurs on the island of Maio. The species was named by Hans Hermann Schleich in 1984. The specific name maioensis refers to the island of Maio, the type locality.

== Taxonomy ==
Previously a subspecies Tarentola rudis maioensis, it was elevated to species status in 2012.
