= Saurodactylus elmoudenii =

Scientific classification
- Kingdom: Animalia
- Phylum: Chordata
- Class: Reptilia
- Order: Squamata
- Suborder: Gekkota
- Family: Sphaerodactylidae
- Genus: Saurodactylus
- Species: S. elmoudenii

Binomial name
- Saurodactylus elmoudenii Javanmardi, Vogler & Joger, 2019

Species of lizard

Saurodactylus elmoudenii is a species of gecko in the Sphaerodactylidae family found in Morocco.
