= Saurodactylus =

Scientific classification
- Kingdom: Animalia
- Phylum: Chordata
- Class: Reptilia
- Order: Squamata
- Suborder: Gekkota
- Family: Sphaerodactylidae
- Genus: Saurodactylus; Fitzinger, 1843

Genus of lizards

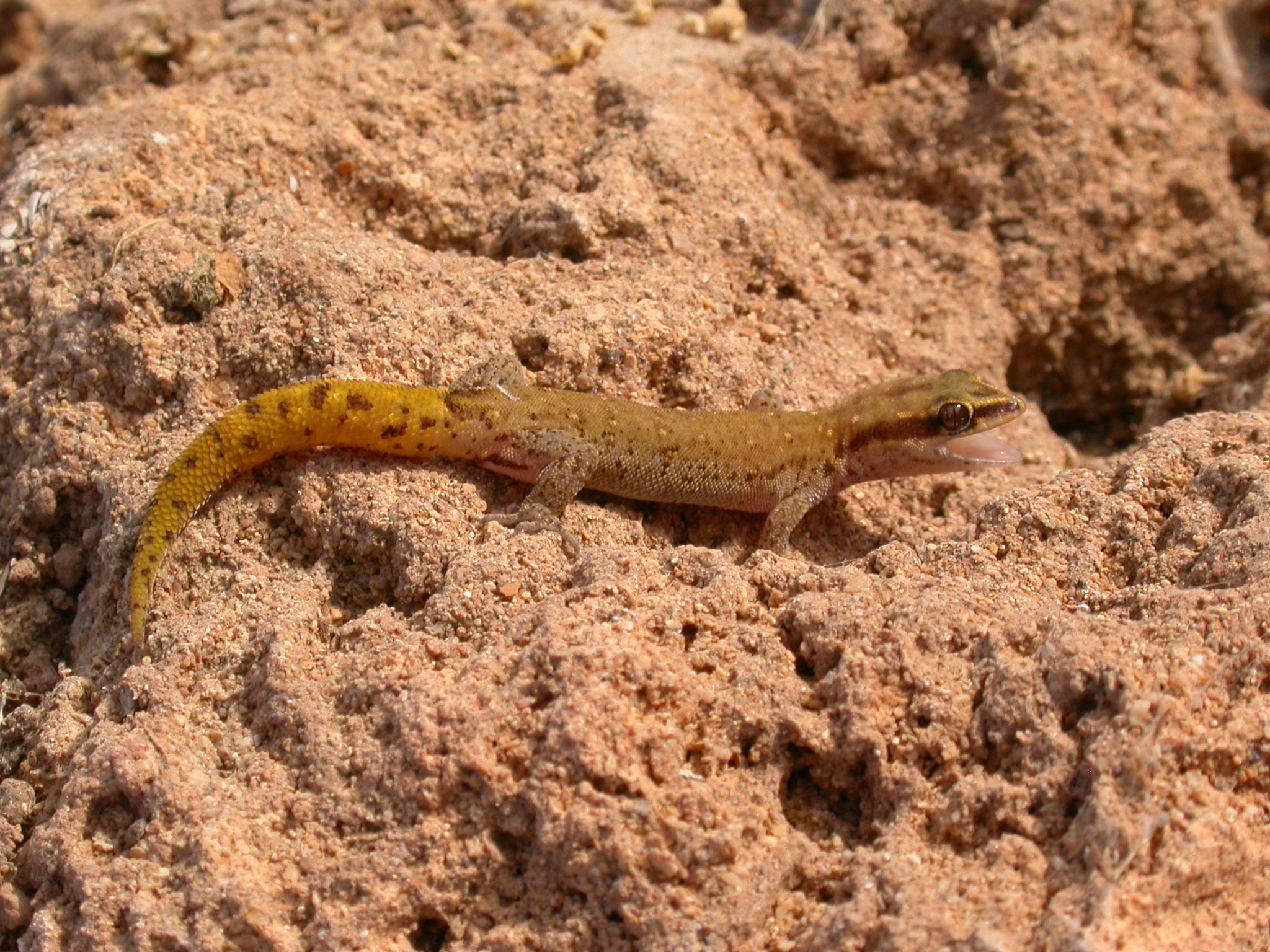
Brosset's Lizard-fingered Gecko (Saurodactylus brosseti)

Saurodactylus is genus of geckos endemic to Northern Africa, better known as lizard-fingered geckos.

== Species ==
The genus is listed as containing 7 species:

- Saurodactylus brosseti (Bons & Pasteur, 1957) - Morocco lizard-fingered gecko
- Saurodactylus elmoudenii Javanmardi, Vogler, & Joger, 2019
- Saurodactylus fasciatus Werner, 1931 - banded-toed gecko or banded lizard-fingered gecko
- Saurodactylus harrisii Javanmardi, Vogler, & Joger, 2019
- Saurodactylus mauritanicus (Duméril & Bibron, 1836) - Morocco lizard-fingered gecko
- Saurodactylus slimanii Javanmardi, Vogler, & Joger, 2019
- Saurodactylus splendidus Javanmardi, Vogler, & Joger, 2019
