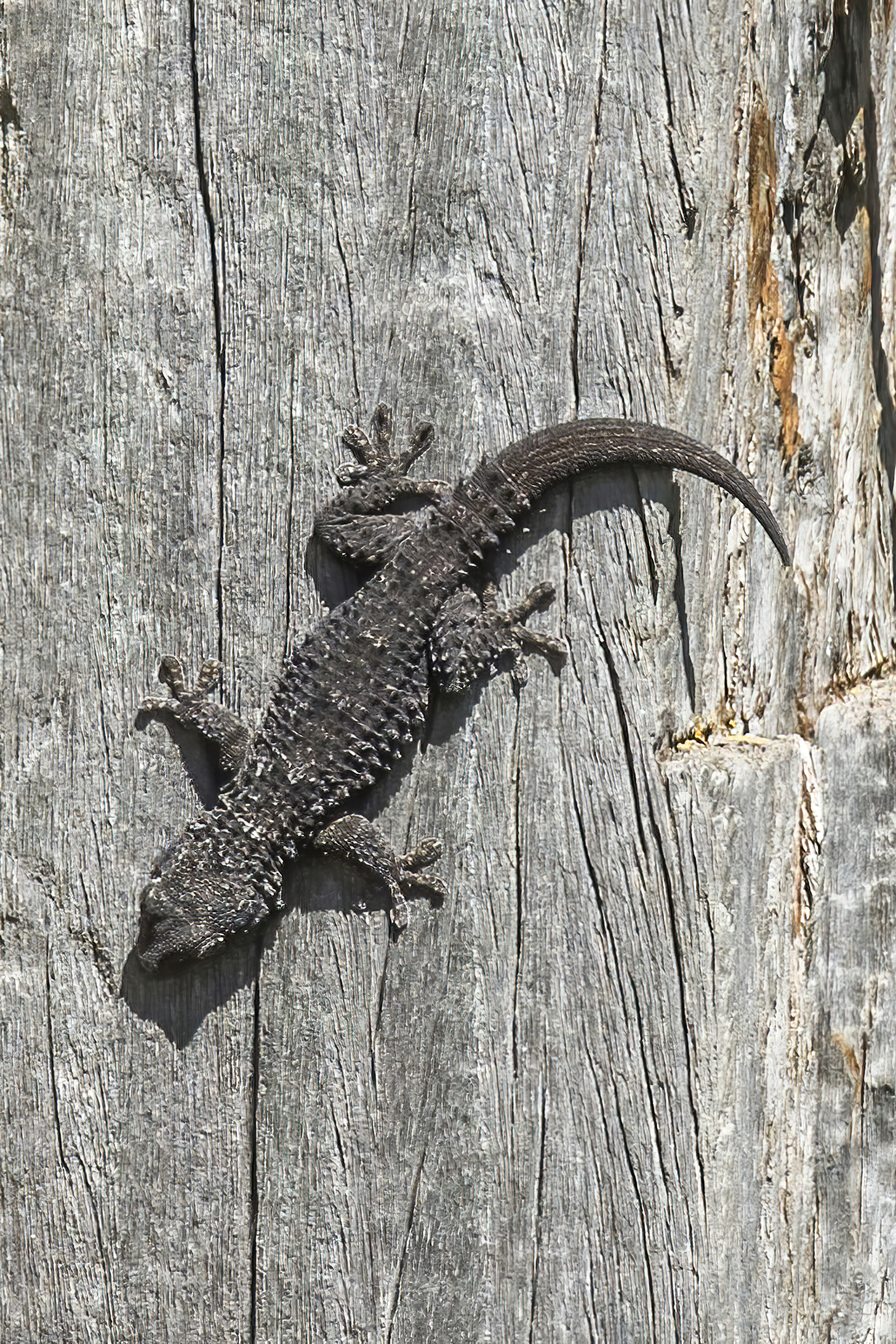

Conservation status
- Least Concern (IUCN 3.1)

Scientific classification
- Kingdom: Animalia
- Phylum: Chordata
- Class: Reptilia
- Order: Squamata
- Suborder: Gekkota
- Family: Phyllodactylidae
- Genus: Tarentola
- Species: T. mauritanica

Binomial name
- Tarentola mauritanica (Linnaeus, 1758)
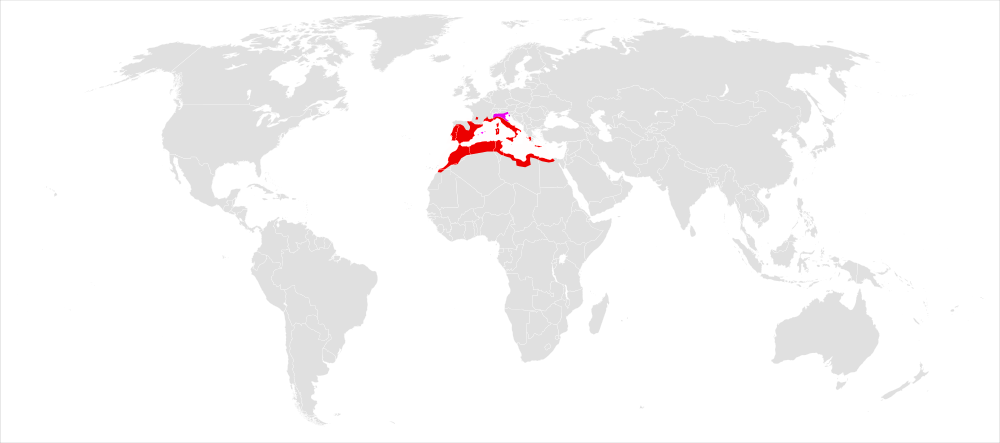
- Native range Introduced range

= Tarentola mauritanica =

Species of reptile

Tarentola mauritanica, known as the common wall gecko, is a species of gecko (Gekkota) native to the western Mediterranean area of North Africa and Europe. It has been introduced to Madeira and Balearic Islands, and the Americas (in Montevideo, Buenos Aires and California). A nocturnal animal with a predominantly insectivorous diet, it is commonly observed on walls in urban environments in warm coastal areas; it can be found further inland, especially in Spain where it has a tradition of cohabitation with humans as an insect hunter. A robust species, up to 15 cm (6 inches) long, its tubercules are enlarged and give the species a spiny armoured appearance.

The species was first described by Carl Linnaeus in 1758. It is also known as Moorish gecko, crocodile gecko, European common gecko, and, regionally, as tarantola, osga, salamanquesa, and dragó.

== Description ==
Adults can measure up to 15 cm (6 inches), tail included. Robust body and flat head. Back, legs and tail with prominent conic tubercles. Its regenerated tail is smoother and doesn't have tubercles. Obtuse mouth, big eyes with no eyelids and vertical pupil. Fingers with big lateral growths and adherent division less laminae in the bottom face. Only the third and fourth fingers end in union. Brownish grey or brown coloration with darker or lighter spots. These colours change in intensity according to the light. When they are active by day their colour is darker than during the night. It can be found on many construction sites, ruins, rock fields, tree trunks, etc.

== Distribution ==
In Europe it can be found through most of the Iberian Peninsula (except northwestern Portugal and most of northern Spain), southern France, coastal Italy, southern Slovenia, northern coastal Croatia and southwestern parts of Greece. In North Africa it ranges from northern Egypt, through northern Libya, northern and central Tunisia, and northern Algeria to most of Morocco. There is an isolated introduced population in southern Western Sahara. It can live up to 2,300 metres (7,500 ft) in altitude.

== Biology ==
It is mainly nocturnal or crepuscular, but may also be active during the day especially near the end of winter on sunny days. It likes to receive sunlight near its refuge. The gecko hunts insects and in the warmer months it can be found hunting nocturnal insects near light sources, street lamps, and the like. It lays two almost-spherical eggs twice a year around April and June. After four months, young of less than 5 cm (2 inches) in length are born. The moorish gecko is slow to mature, taking 4 to 5 years in captivity.

The introduction of the species may impact on native fauna, by preying on frogs and smaller lizards. The adoption of this species as a pet has led to populations becoming established in Florida and elsewhere.

It is the host of Haemoproteus tarentolae, a protozoan species in the genus Haemoproteus, and Esther's gecko mite (Geckobia estherae), endemic to Malta.

== Image gallery ==
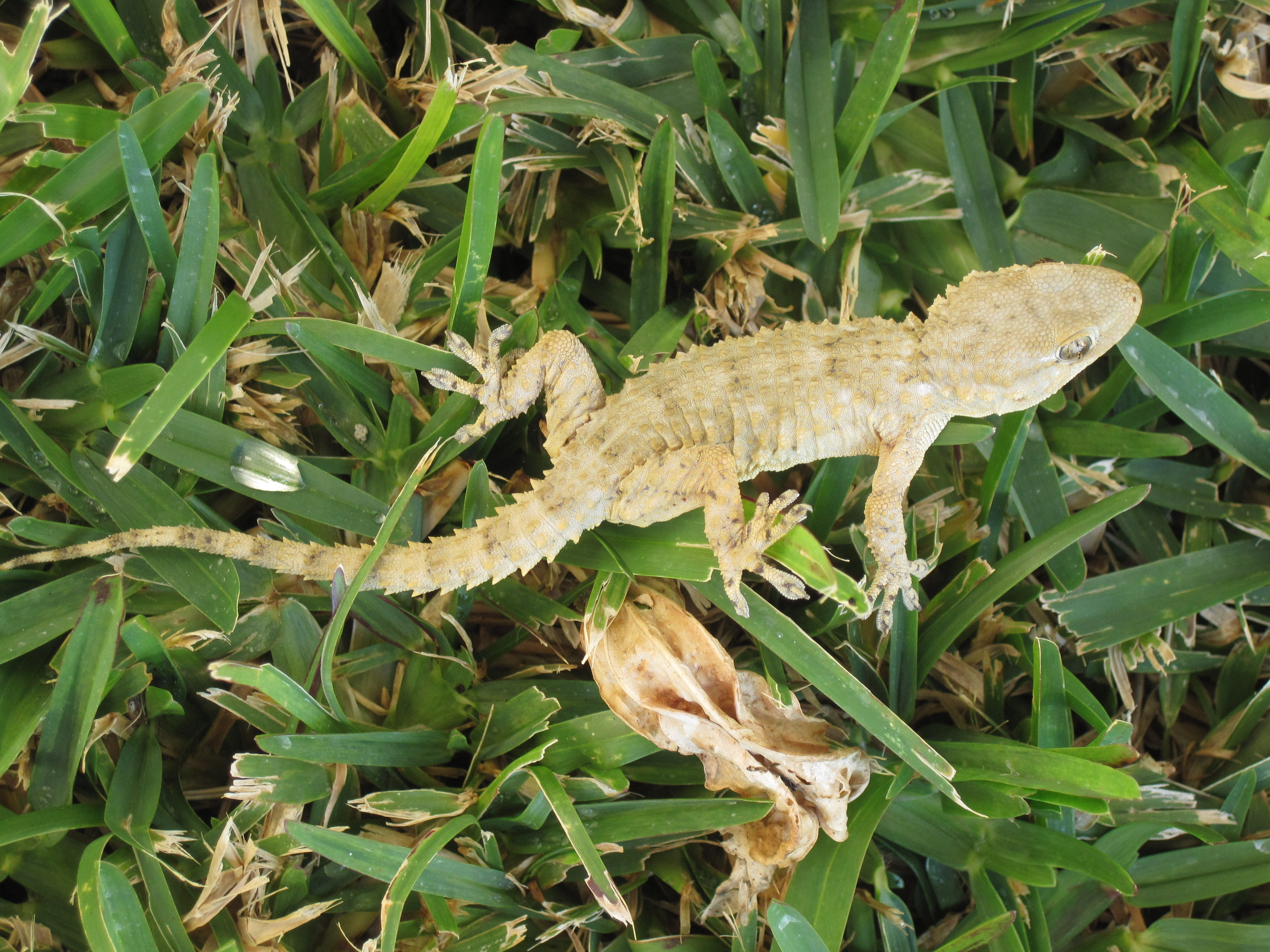
Tarentola mauritanica, Spain

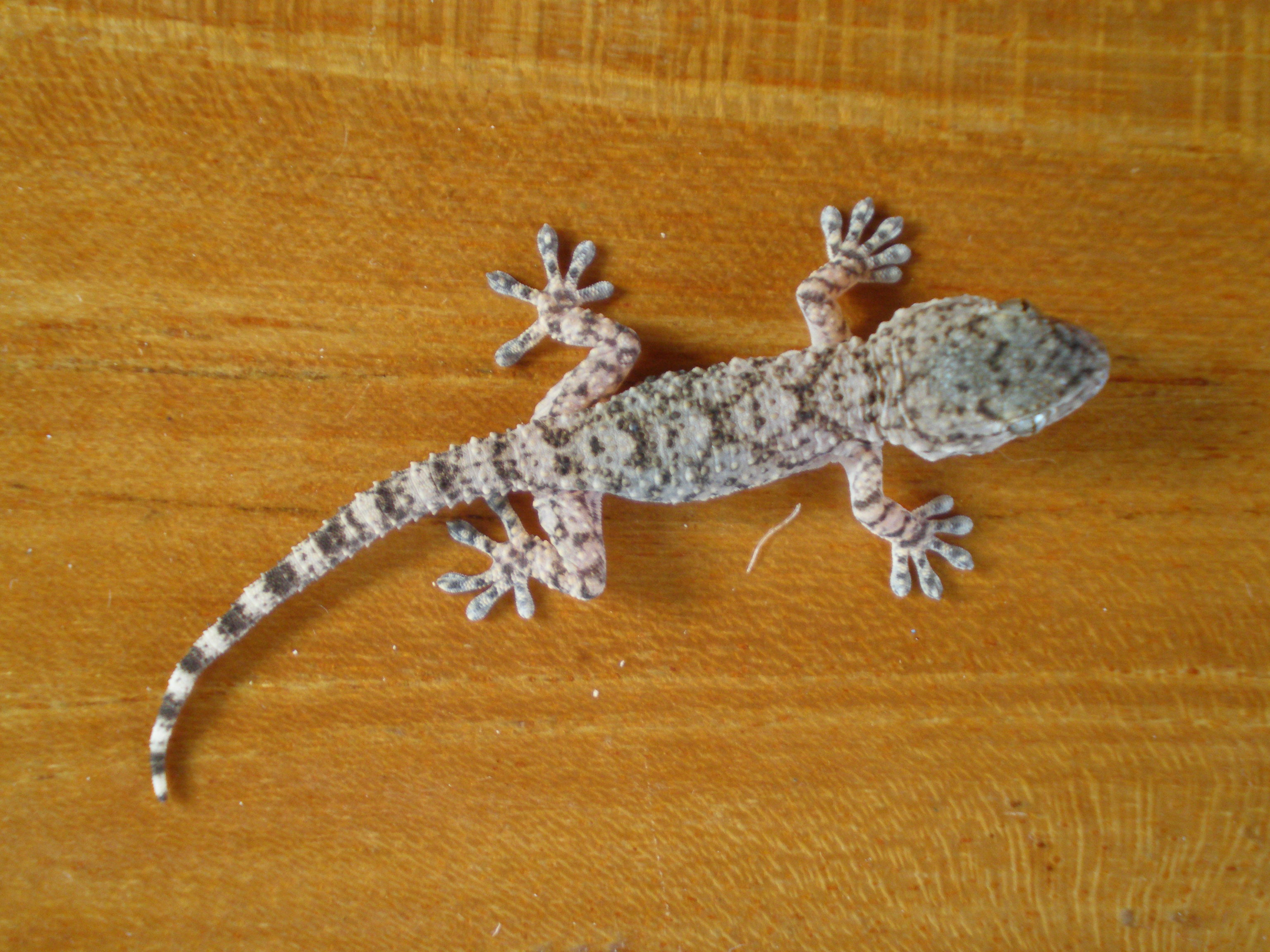
Tarentola mauritanica from the region of Montpellier

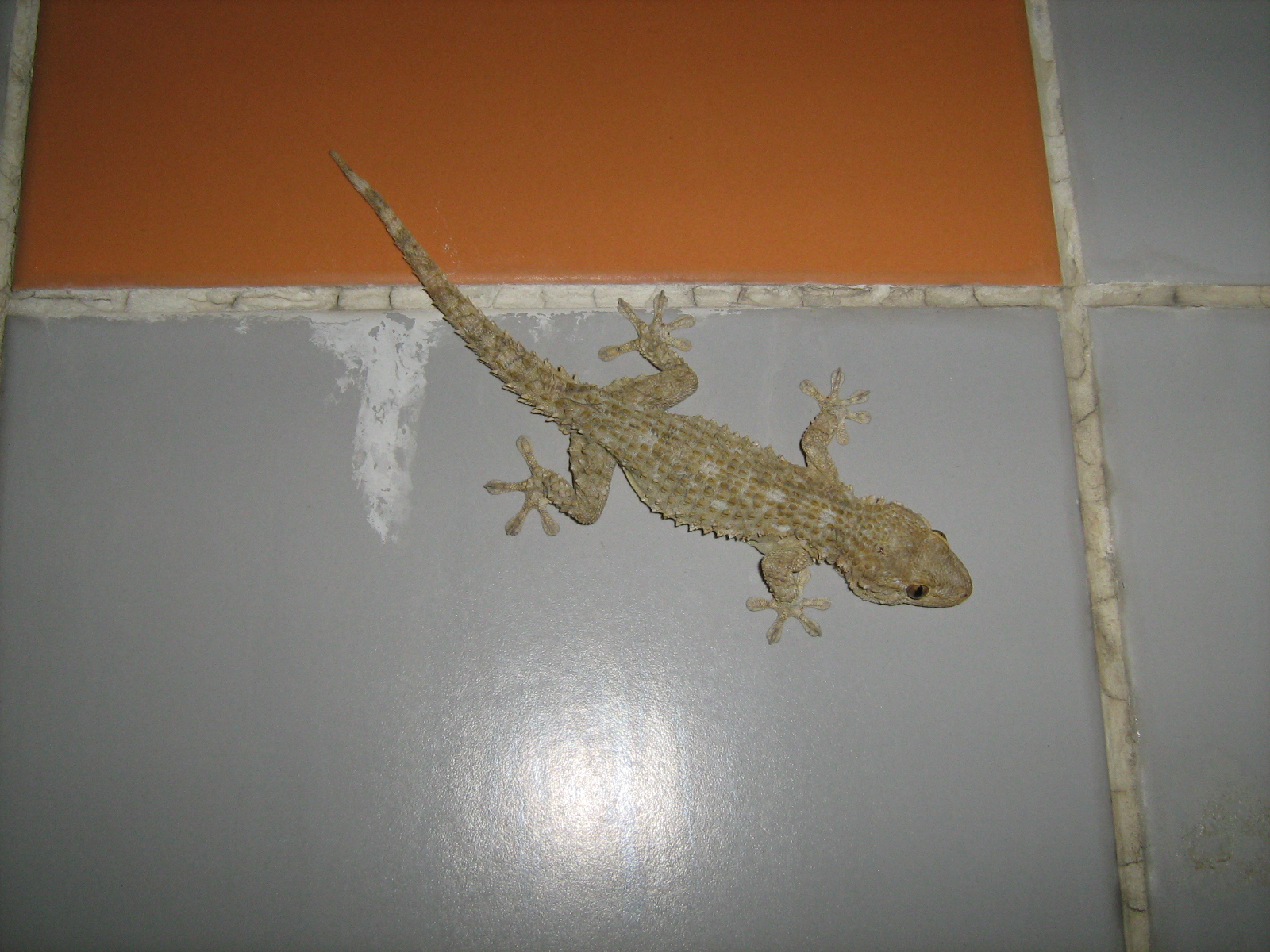
Tarentola mauritanica, Portugal

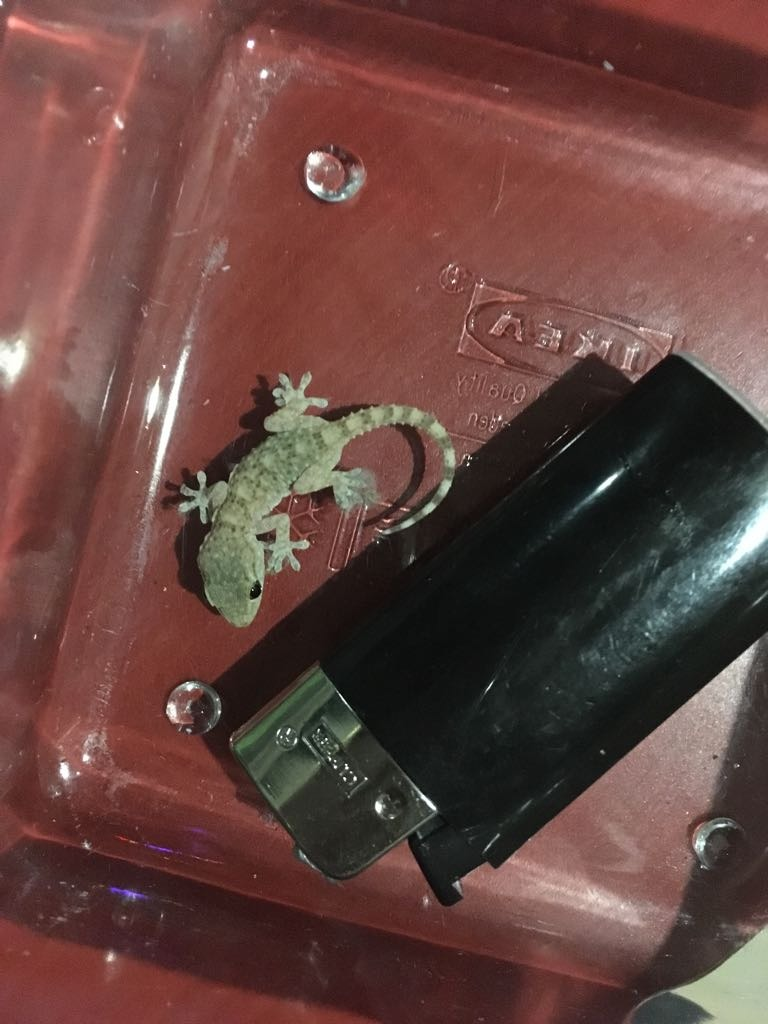
Individual recently hatched

== See also ==
Lists

- List of reptiles of Europe
  - List of reptiles of Metropolitan France
  - List of amphibians and reptiles of Gibraltar
  - List of reptiles of Italy
  - List of reptiles of Spain
- List of reptiles of Morocco
- List of reptiles of North America
  - List of reptiles of California

other

- Fauna of Europe
- Wildlife of Algeria
- Amphibia in the 10th edition of Systema Naturae
