= Pterygosomatidae =

Pterygosomatidae Temporal range: Cretaceous–present

Scientific classification
- Kingdom: Animalia
- Phylum: Arthropoda
- Subphylum: Chelicerata
- Class: Arachnida
- Order: Trombidiformes
- Superfamily: Pterygosomatoidea
- Family: Pterygosomatidae; Oudemans, 1910

Family of mites

Pterygosomatidae is a family of prostigs in the order Trombidiformes. There are at least two genera and two described species in Pterygosomatidae.

== Genera ==
- Geckobia
- Pimeliaphilus
