= Boa Vista wall gecko =

Conservation status
- Vulnerable (IUCN 3.1)

Scientific classification
- Kingdom: Animalia
- Phylum: Chordata
- Class: Reptilia
- Order: Squamata
- Suborder: Gekkota
- Family: Phyllodactylidae
- Genus: Tarentola
- Species: T. boavistensis

Binomial name
- Tarentola boavistensis Joger, 1993

Synonyms
- Tarentola rudis boavistensis (Joger, 1993)

Species of lizard

The Boa Vista wall gecko (Tarentola boavistensis) is a species of geckos in the family Phyllodactylidae. The species is endemic to Cape Verde, where it occurs on the island of Boa Vista. The specific name boavistensis refers to the type locality.

== Synonyms ==
- Tarentola rudis boavistensis Vasconcelos, Perera, Geniez, Harris & Carranza, 2012.
