= Saurodactylus mauritanicus =

Conservation status
- Least Concern (IUCN 3.1)

Scientific classification
- Kingdom: Animalia
- Phylum: Chordata
- Class: Reptilia
- Order: Squamata
- Suborder: Gekkota
- Family: Sphaerodactylidae
- Genus: Saurodactylus
- Species: S. mauritanicus

Binomial name
- Saurodactylus mauritanicus (Duméril and Bibron, 1836)

Synonyms
- Gymnodactylus mauritanicus; Saurodactylus desertorum

Species of lizard

Saurodactylus mauritanicus is a species of gecko in the Sphaerodactylidae family found in Morocco, Western Sahara, and possibly Algeria. Both this species and Saurodactylus brosseti were both commonly known as the Morocco lizard-fingered gecko, and were both considered conspecific. Its natural habitats are temperate forests, rocky areas, arable land, and pastureland. It is threatened by habitat loss.
