= Desert wall gecko =

Conservation status
- Least Concern (IUCN 3.1)

Scientific classification
- Kingdom: Animalia
- Phylum: Chordata
- Class: Reptilia
- Order: Squamata
- Suborder: Gekkota
- Family: Phyllodactylidae
- Genus: Tarentola
- Species: T. deserti

Binomial name
- Tarentola deserti Boulenger, 1891

Species of lizard

The desert wall gecko (Tarentola deserti) is a species of lizard in the family Phyllodactylidae. It is found in Algeria, Morocco, Tunisia, and possibly Libya. Its natural habitats are subtropical or tropical dry shrubland, Mediterranean-type shrubby vegetation, freshwater spring, rocky areas, hot deserts, rural gardens, and urban areas.

== Status & Threats ==
The desert wall gecko's population is not changing at the moment, and has a small population. They don't have any current threats at the moment.

== Conservation ==
The species may exist in some national parks, such as Dghoumes National park in Tunisia.
