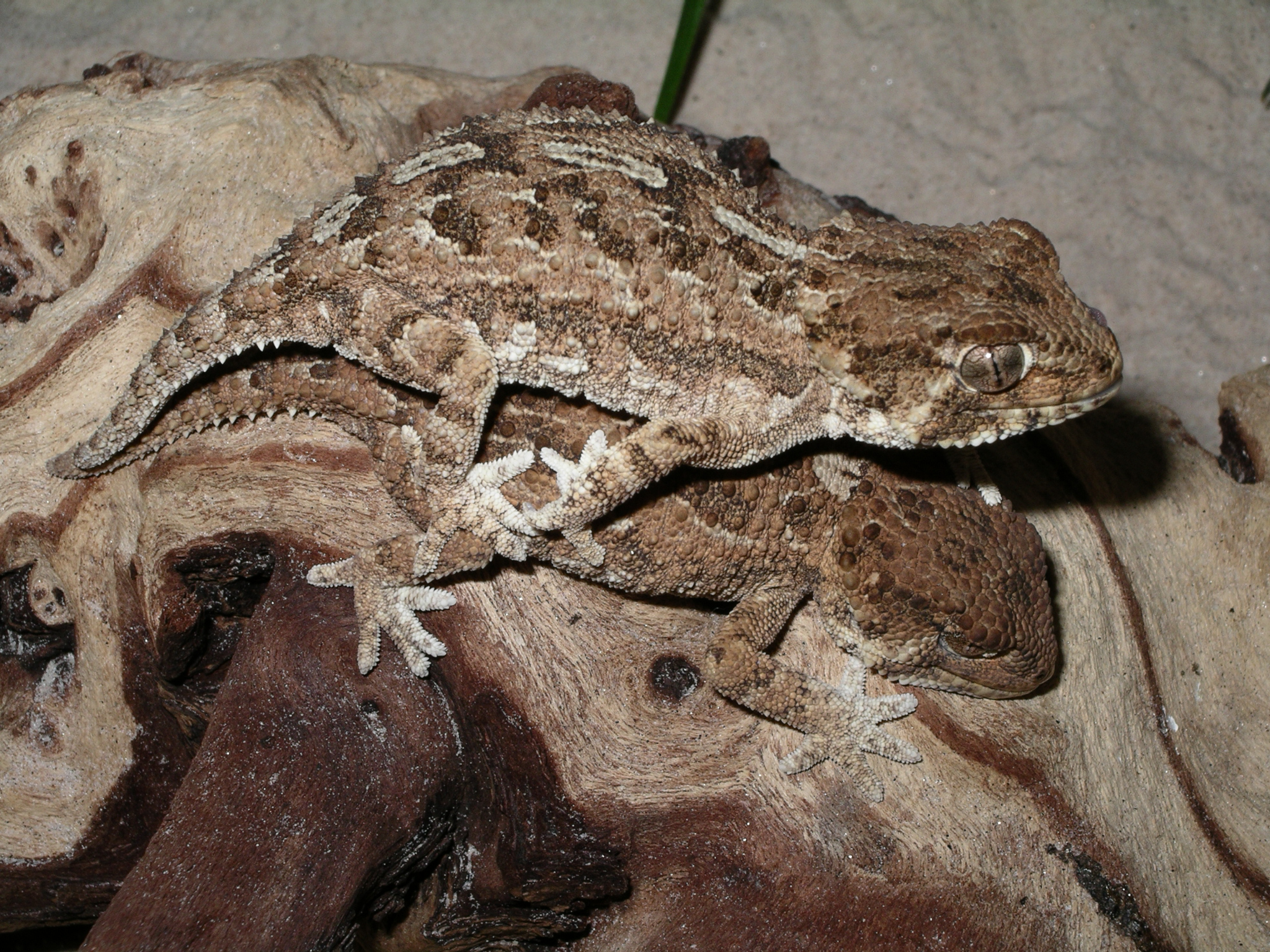

Conservation status
- Vulnerable (IUCN 3.1)
- CITES Appendix II

Scientific classification
- Kingdom: Animalia
- Phylum: Chordata
- Class: Reptilia
- Order: Squamata
- Suborder: Gekkota
- Family: Phyllodactylidae
- Genus: Tarentola
- Species: T. chazaliae

Binomial name
- Tarentola chazaliae (Mocquard, 1895)

Synonyms
- Geckonia chazaliae Mocquard, 1895; Tarentola chazaliae — Carranza, Arnold, Mateo & Geniez, 2002

= Helmethead gecko =

Species of lizard

The helmethead gecko (Tarentola chazaliae), also known commonly as the helmeted gecko, is a species of lizard in the family Phyllodactylidae. The species is native to the northwestern coast of Africa, where it is present in Mauritania, Morocco, and Western Sahara. The environment in which this gecko lives is sandy and rocky desert with sparse vegetation, in a zone near the coast where the humidity is high.

== Description ==
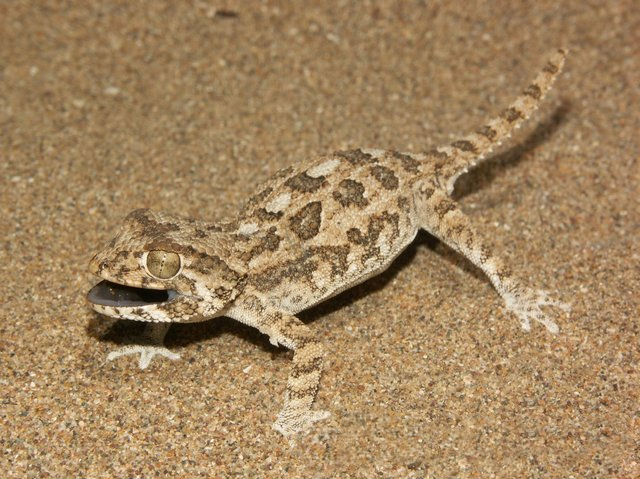

The adult helmethead gecko has a snout-to-vent length (SVL) of 7.5 cm (3.0 in) and a total length of about 11 cm (4.3 in). The head is covered with small granulations and the tubercles at the back of the head are enlarged and form a casque. The digits are flattened and spatulate. Dorsally, the helmethead gecko can be from light grey to dark brown, either uniform in color or with pale or dark blotches. The underside is light-colored.

== Ecology ==
T. chazaliae is mainly nocturnal, and whereas most lizards are diurnal and have lost the rod structures in the retina that is typical of vertebrates, retaining only cones, this gecko has further adapted its eyes so that it has some degree of color vision at night. The gecko has developed a multifocal optical system which enables it to distinguish between light at different wavelengths. The pupils of this gecko are circular during the night but take the form of a pair of pinhole size pupils in each eye during the day. The precise function of this change is unclear, but it has been suggested that the pinhole pupils may be less visible to potential predators while the lizard is basking in the sun. Helmethead geckos are the first known vertebrates which are able to see color at very low levels of light, and their acute color vision at night is 350 times better than that of humans.

== Etymology ==
The specific name, chazaliae, is in honor of the yacht Chazalie, which belonged to French naturalist Raymond Comte de Dalmas (1862–1930), who collected the holotype. The common name, helmethead gecko, derives from the shape of the head caused by some of the scales at the back of it.

== Conservation status ==
The helmethead gecko has a relatively restricted range and is collected for the pet trade. The population trend is downwards as its habitat is degraded by coastal development, especially in Morocco, and the International Union for Conservation of Nature has assessed its conservation status as being "vulnerable".
