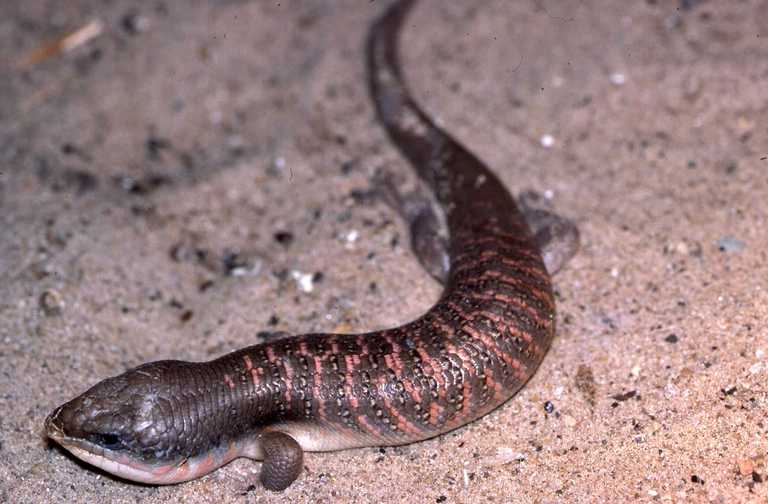
- Eumeces algeriensis

Conservation status
- Least Concern (IUCN 3.1)

Scientific classification
- Kingdom: Animalia
- Phylum: Chordata
- Class: Reptilia
- Order: Squamata
- Family: Scincidae
- Genus: Eumeces
- Species: E. algeriensis

Binomial name
- Eumeces algeriensis W. Peters, 1864
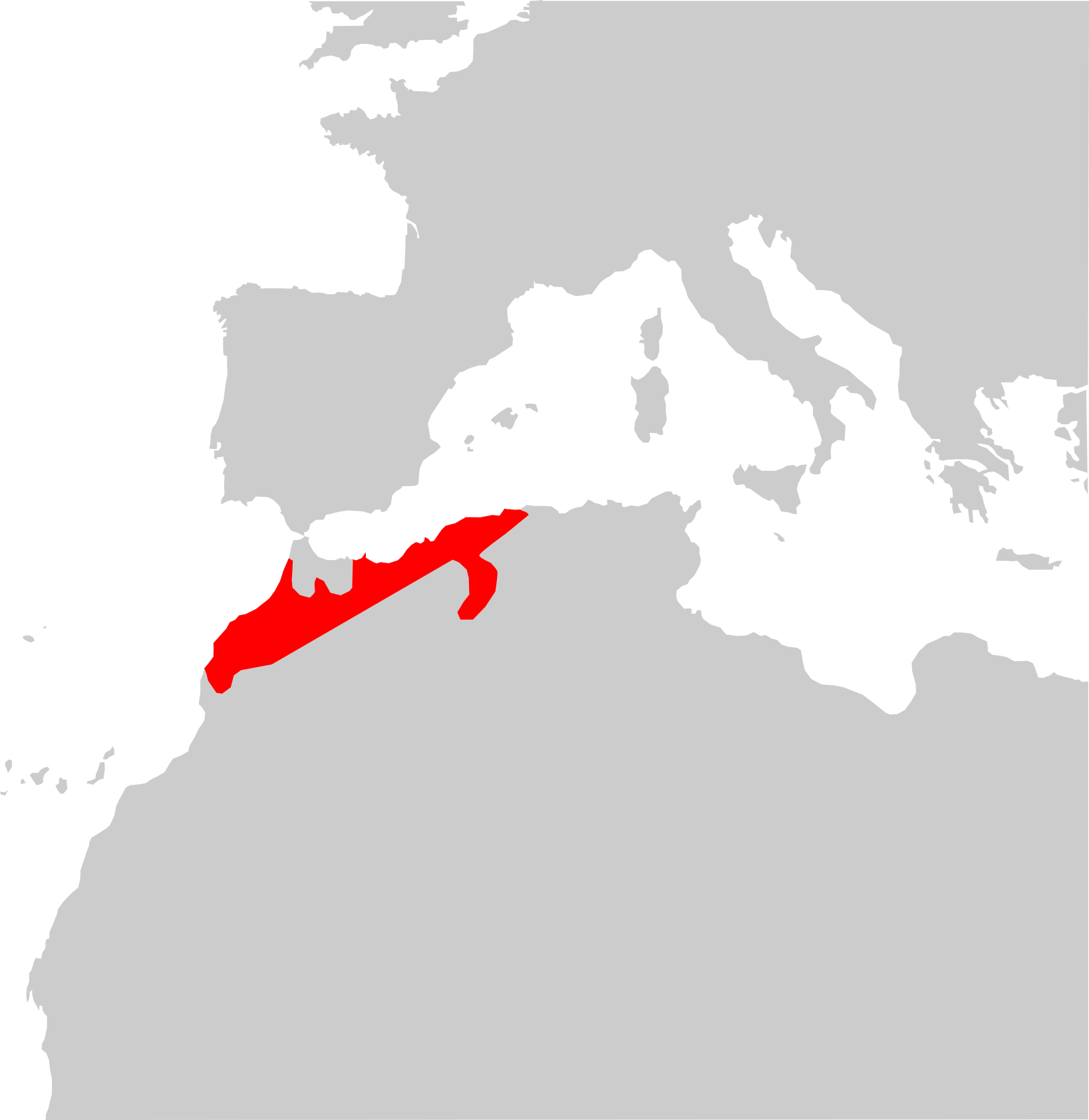

Synonyms
- Eumeces pavimentatus var. algeriensis W. Peters, 1864; Eumeces algeriensis — Boulenger, 1887; Eumeces schneideri algeriensis — Eiselt, 1940; Eumeces algeriensis — Caputo et al., 1993; Novoeumeces algeriensis — Griffith et al., 2000; Eumeces algeriensis — Schmitz et al., 2004

= Eumeces algeriensis =

Algerian skink

Species of lizard

Eumeces algeriensis, commonly called the Algerian skink, Algerian orange-tailed skink, Berber's skink, in French eumece d'Algérie, or in Spanish bulán, is a species of skink in the family Scincidae. The species is endemic to the Maghreb region of North Africa.

== Geographic range ==
E. algeriensis is found in Algeria and Morocco (including the Spanish exclave Melilla).

== Habitat ==
The natural habitats of E. algeriensis are temperate forests, Mediterranean-type shrubby vegetation, temperate grassland, sandy shores, arable land, pastureland, plantations, and rural gardens.

== Reproduction ==
E. algeriensis is oviparous.
