= Tarentola hoggarensis =

Conservation status
- Least Concern (IUCN 3.1)

Scientific classification
- Kingdom: Animalia
- Phylum: Chordata
- Class: Reptilia
- Order: Squamata
- Suborder: Gekkota
- Family: Phyllodactylidae
- Genus: Tarentola
- Species: T. hoggarensis

Binomial name
- Tarentola hoggarensis Werner, 1937

Species of lizard

The African wall gecko (Tarentola hoggarensis) is found in northern Africa.
