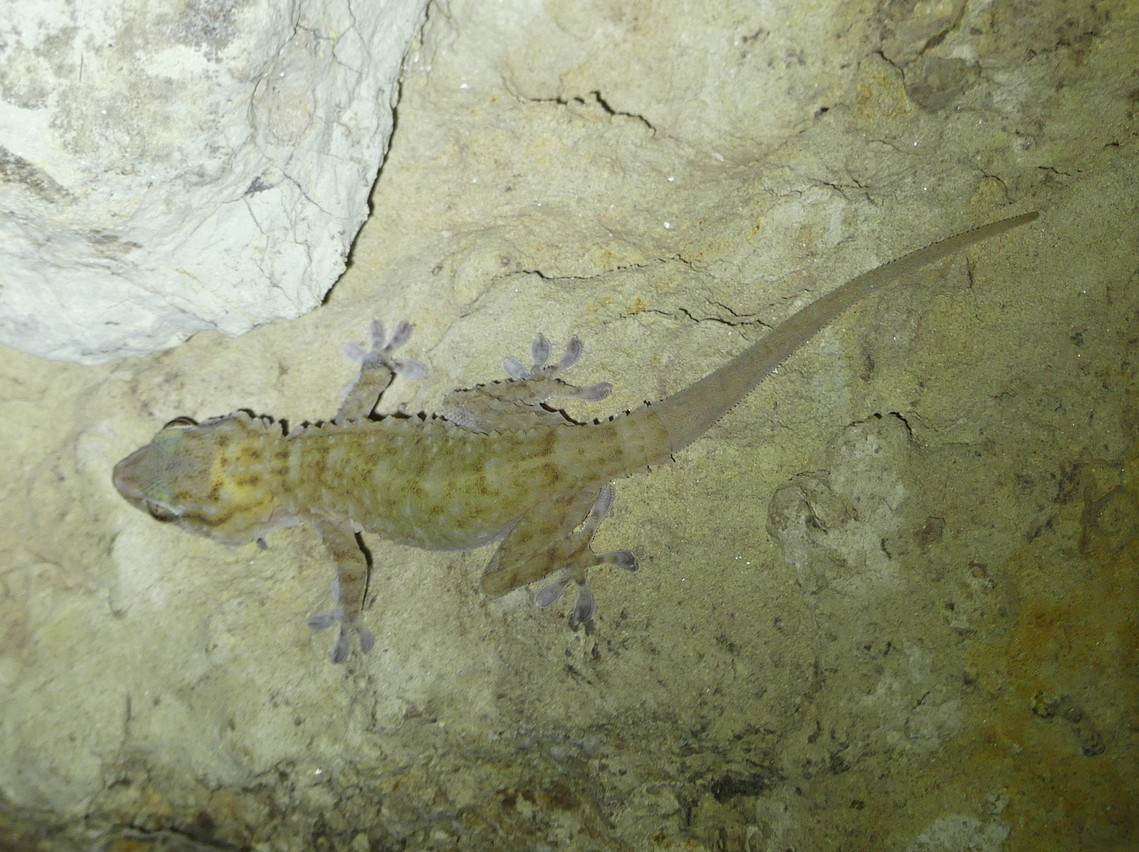

Conservation status
- Least Concern (IUCN 3.1)

Scientific classification
- Kingdom: Animalia
- Phylum: Chordata
- Class: Reptilia
- Order: Squamata
- Suborder: Gekkota
- Family: Phyllodactylidae
- Genus: Tarentola
- Species: T. boehmei

Binomial name
- Tarentola boehmei Joger, 1984

= Böhme's gecko =

Species of lizard

Böhme's gecko (Tarentola boehmei), also commonly known as the Morocco wall gecko, is a species of lizard in the family Phyllodactylidae. The species is native to western North Africa, where it is found in rocky areas such as cliffs and walls as well as ruins of buildings and urban areas.

== Etymology ==
Both the specific name, boehmei, and the common name, Böhme's gecko, are in honor of German herpetologist Wolfgang Böhme.

== Description ==
Böhme's gecko is a medium-sized species with a snout-to-vent length (SVL) of 7.5 cm (3.0 in) and a total length (including tail) of about 11 cm (4.3 in). The pupil is a vertical slit, and the eyelids are unable to close over the eye, being replaced by a transparent membrane. The tips of the digits are enlarged, and the whole of the digits are flattened. There is a distinctive rosette of secondary tubercles around the primary tubercles on the flanks, and the nostrils are united on the snout.

== Geographic range ==
Böhme's gecko is found in southern Morocco, northern Western Sahara, and possibly in Algeria and Mauritania. In Morocco it is present in Tazzarine, the southern part of the Anti-Atlas Mountains, the Draa River Valley and Jebel Bani, a lower range of mountains.

== Habitat ==
The natural habitats of T. boehmei are subtropical or tropical dry shrublands and rocky areas. It is also found in rural gardens, and urban areas.

== Reproduction ==
T. boehmei is oviparous.

== Conservation status ==
Böhme's gecko has a relatively restricted geographic range but is common in many places within this area. It is tolerant of disturbance to its habitat, the population trend seems steady, and no particular threats have been detected. So the International Union for Conservation of Nature has assessed its conservation status as being of "least concern".
