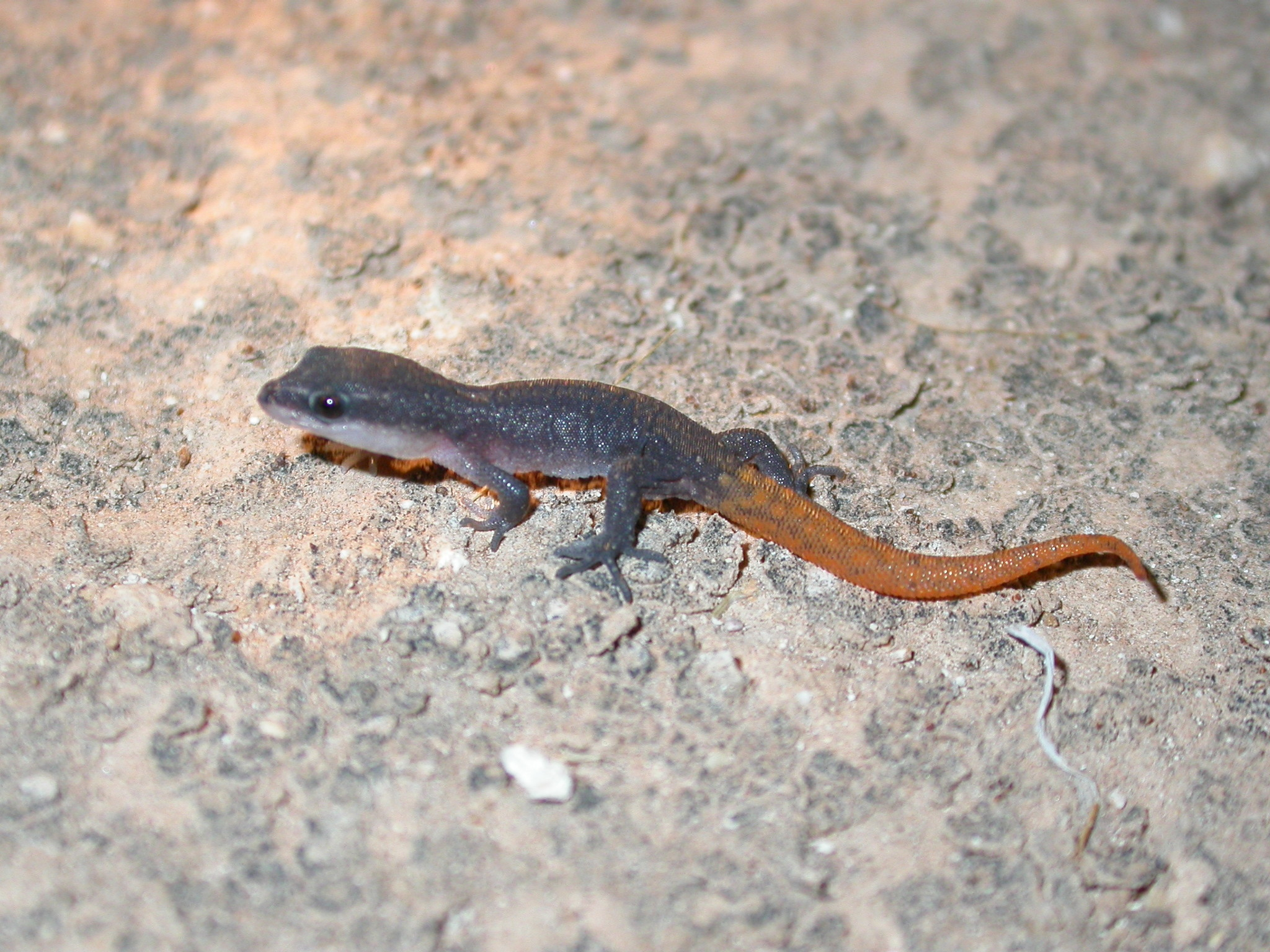

Conservation status
- Least Concern (IUCN 3.1)

Scientific classification
- Kingdom: Animalia
- Phylum: Chordata
- Class: Reptilia
- Order: Squamata
- Suborder: Gekkota
- Family: Sphaerodactylidae
- Genus: Saurodactylus
- Species: S. brosseti

Binomial name
- Saurodactylus brosseti Bons & Pasteur, 1957

Synonyms
- Saurodactylus mauritanicus ssp. brosseti Bons and Pasteur, 1957

= Saurodactylus brosseti =

Species of lizard

Saurodactylus brosseti is a species of gecko in the Sphaerodactylidae family found in western Morocco. Both this species and Saurodactylus mauritanicus were both commonly known as the Morocco lizard-fingered gecko, and were both considered conspecific. Its natural habitats are temperate forests, rocky areas, arable land, and pastureland. It is threatened by habitat loss.

There may be four distinct lineages of Saurodactylus brosseti.
