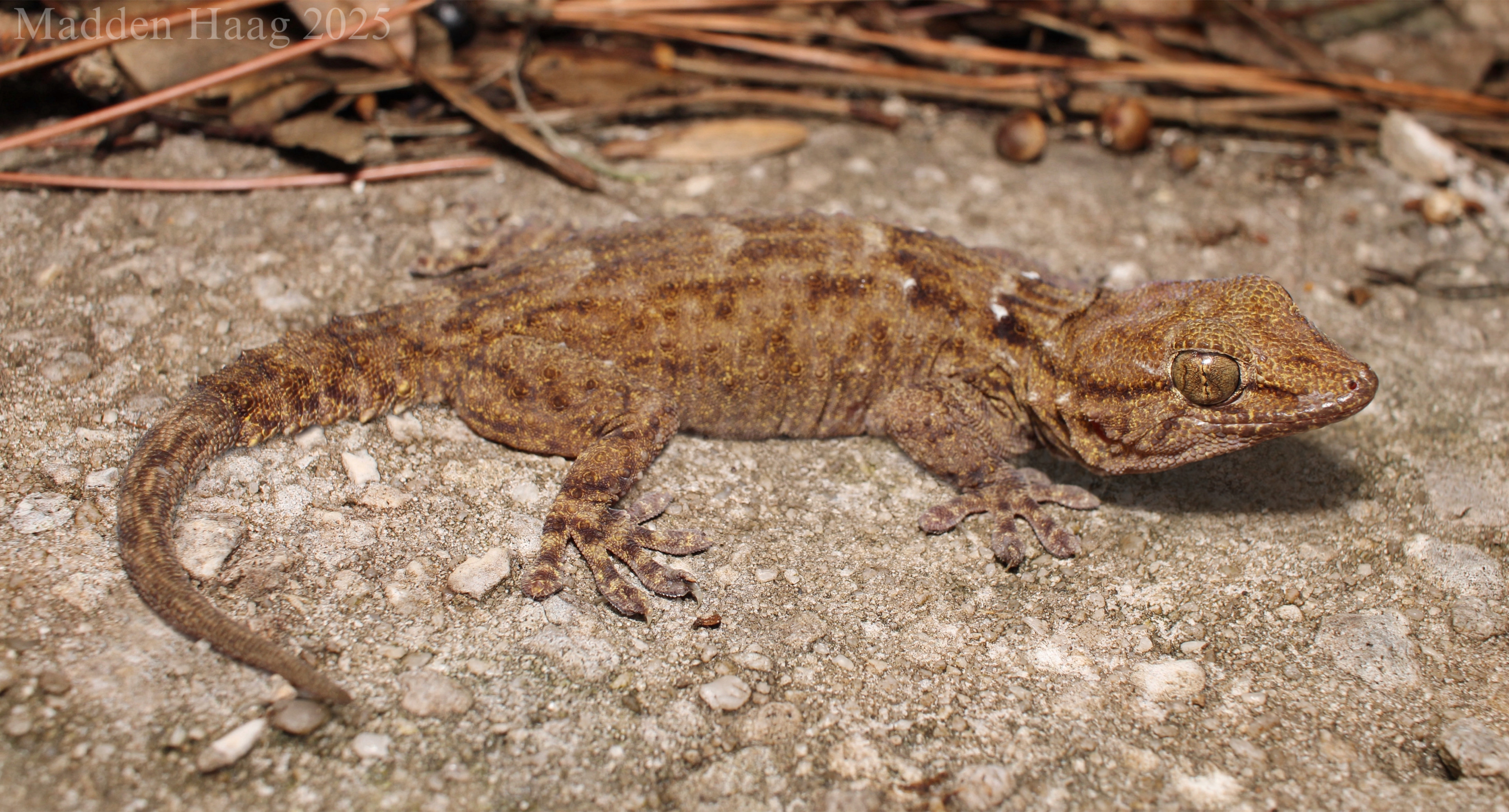
- White spotted wall gecko (Tarentola annularis)

Conservation status
- Least Concern (IUCN 3.1)

Scientific classification
- Kingdom: Animalia
- Phylum: Chordata
- Class: Reptilia
- Order: Squamata
- Suborder: Gekkota
- Family: Phyllodactylidae
- Genus: Tarentola
- Species: T. annularis

Binomial name
- Tarentola annularis (St. Hilaire, 1827)

= Tarentola annularis =

Species of gecko native to northern Africa

Tarentola annularis, also known as the white-spotted wall gecko or ringed wall gecko, is a species of gecko. It is native to northern Africa.

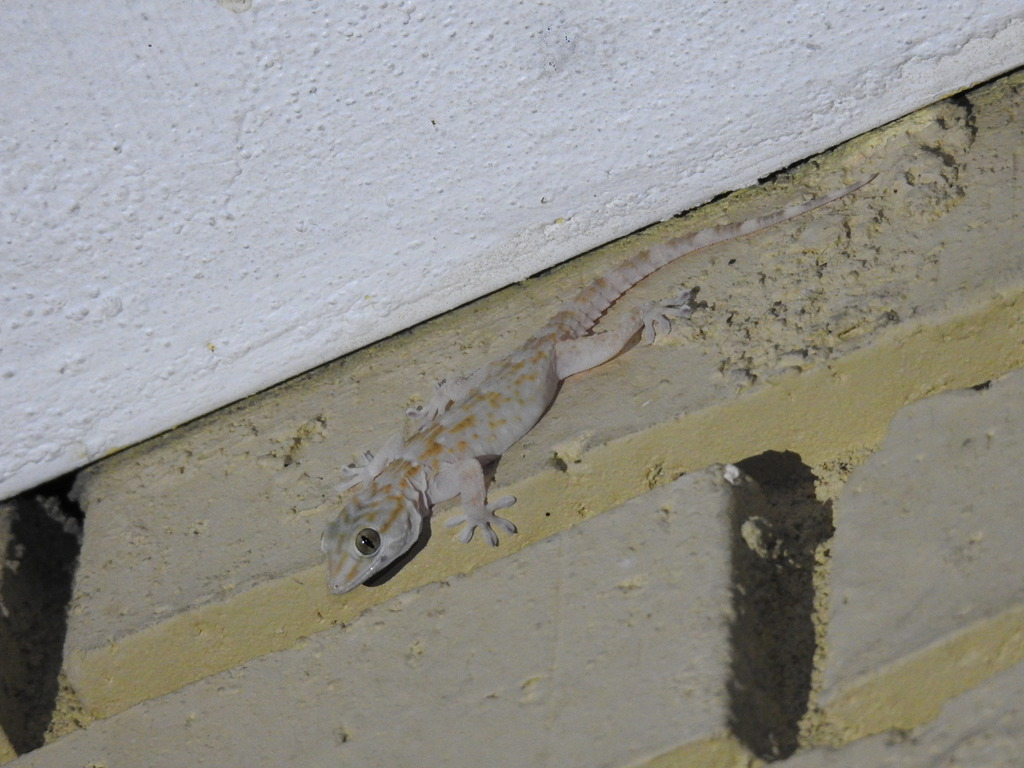
T. annularis in Florida, where it has been introduced
