= Albert Schwartz (zoologist) =

American zoologist

- Born: September 13, 1923; Cincinnati, Ohio, United States
- Died: October 18, 1992 (aged 69); Miami, Florida, U.S.
- Education: University of Cincinnati; University of Michigan; University of Miami
- Scientific career
- Fields: Herpetology

Albert Schwartz (September 13, 1923 – October 18, 1992) was an American zoologist who worked extensively with the herpetofauna of Florida and the West Indies, and later with butterflies. One magazine article once dubbed him as one of the "Kings of West Indian Anole Taxonomy".

== Career ==
Schwartz obtained his PhD from the University of Michigan in mammalogy in 1952. Already at that time, he had a keen interest in amphibians and reptiles, as well as in warmer climates. Schwartz spent most of his professional working life at Miami-Dade Community College; he was also supported by a family trust, which he used to fund his own activities as well as field expeditions by others. He was a Research Associate of the Carnegie Museum of Natural History, and also an associate of the Florida Museum of Natural History, the National Museum of Natural History (Smithsonian Institution), and the Museo Nacional de Historia Natural, Santo Domingo, Dominican Republic. Starting in 1954, he worked extensively in Cuba, and described numerous frogs as well as three anole species from there. After the revolution in Cuba, he shifted his attention to Hispaniola, where he again described numerous frog species and five anoles. In the late 1970s, when Schwartz saw the number of new amphibians and reptiles he could describe from the West Indies diminishing, he shifted his attention to butterflies.

== Legacy ==
Schwartz published 230 papers on West Indian biology. 80 of the amphibian and reptile species he had described were recognized as valid in 1993; he is credited to have described 14% of the entire West Indian herpetofauna. Schwartz is one of the top-10 most productive alpha-taxonomists in herpetology, having described 299 reptiles (species and subspecies) that were still valid in 2018. A number of taxa are named in his honor, including the following:

- Anolis schwartzi – may be a subspecies of Anolis wattsi
- Chilabothrus chrysogaster schwartzi
- Eleutherodactylus schwartzi – Schwartz's robber frog, Virgin Islands coqui
- Schwartzius – a subgenus of Eleutherodactylus
- Sphaerodactylus schwartzi – Guantanamo collared sphaero
- Tarentola albertschwartzi – a gecko
- Tropidophis schwartzi – a dwarf boa
- Typhlops schwartzi – Schwartz's worm snake
- Artibeus schwartzi – Schwartz's fruit-eating bat

=== Works ===
- Schwartz A, Thomas R (1975). A Check-list of West Indian Amphibians and Reptiles. Carnegie Museum of Natural History Special Publication No. 1. Pittsburgh, Pennsylvania: Carnegie Museum of Natural History. 216 pp.
- Schwartz A, Henderson RW (1991). Amphibians and Reptiles of the West Indies: Descriptions, Distributions, and Natural History. Gainesville, Florida: University Press of Florida. ISBN 0-8130-1049-7.
