= Dugès =

Dugès is a surname. Notable people with the surname include:

- Antoine Louis Dugès (1797–1838), French obstetrician and naturalist
- Alfredo Dugès (1826–1910), French-born Mexican physician and naturalist, son of Antoine
- Marie Jonet Dugès (1730–1797), French midwife
