= List of amphibians of the Azores =

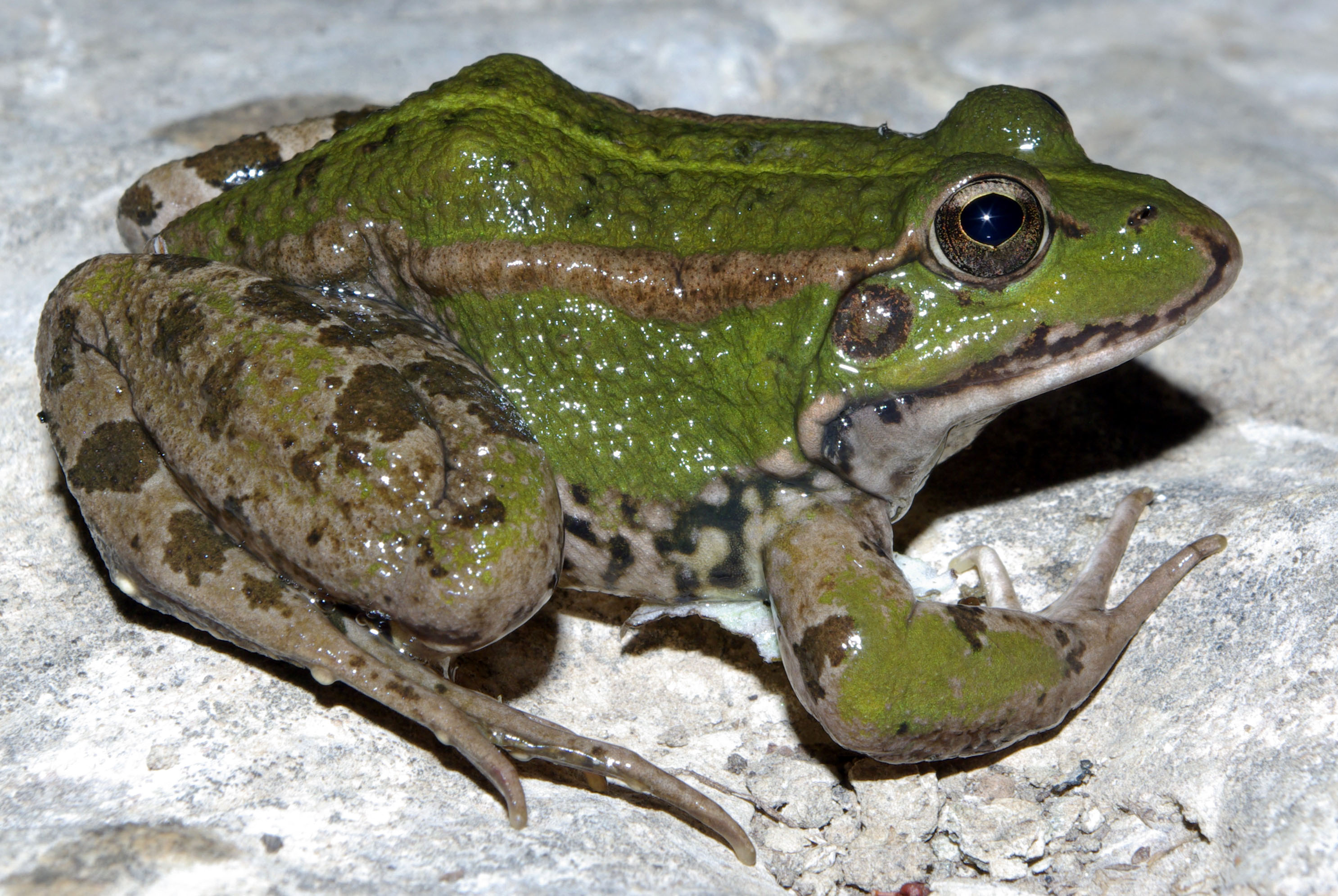
Iberian green frog

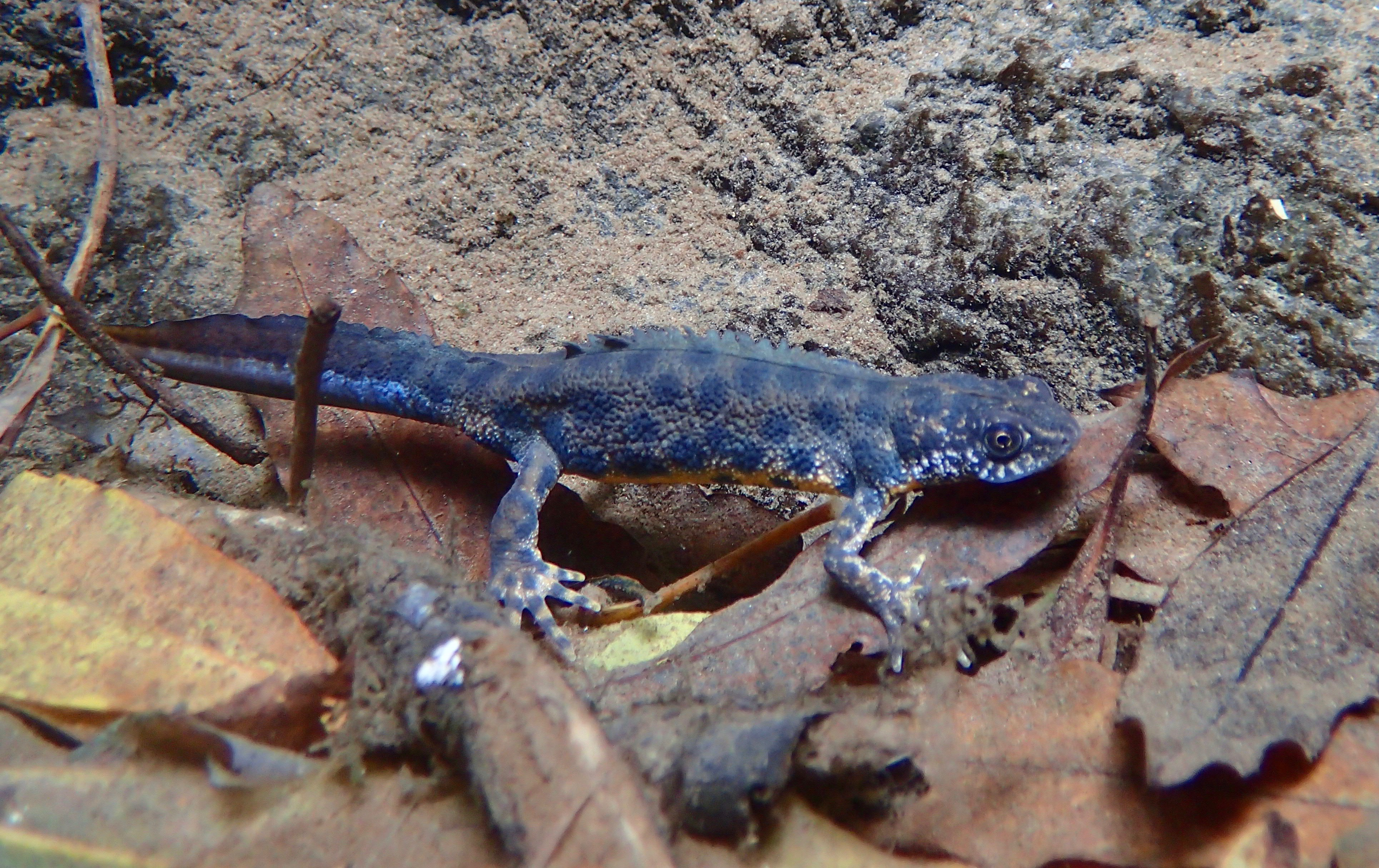
Italian crested newt

There are two amphibian species that live in the Azores archipelago.

The Iberian green frog was introduced by humans at the beginning of the 19th century in order to control mosquito plagues. Meanwhile, the Italian crested newt was introduced on the island of São Miguel at the beginning of the 20th century, possibly by accident.

== Anura ==
=== Ranidae ===
- Iberian green frog (Pelophylax perezi) LC

== Caudata ==
=== Salamandridae ===
- Italian crested newt (Triturus carnifex) VU

== See also ==
- List of mammals of the Azores
- List of birds of the Azores
- List of reptiles of the Azores
- List of amphibians of Madeira
- List of amphibians of the Canary Islands
- List of amphibians of Cape Verde
