= List of reptiles of the Azores =

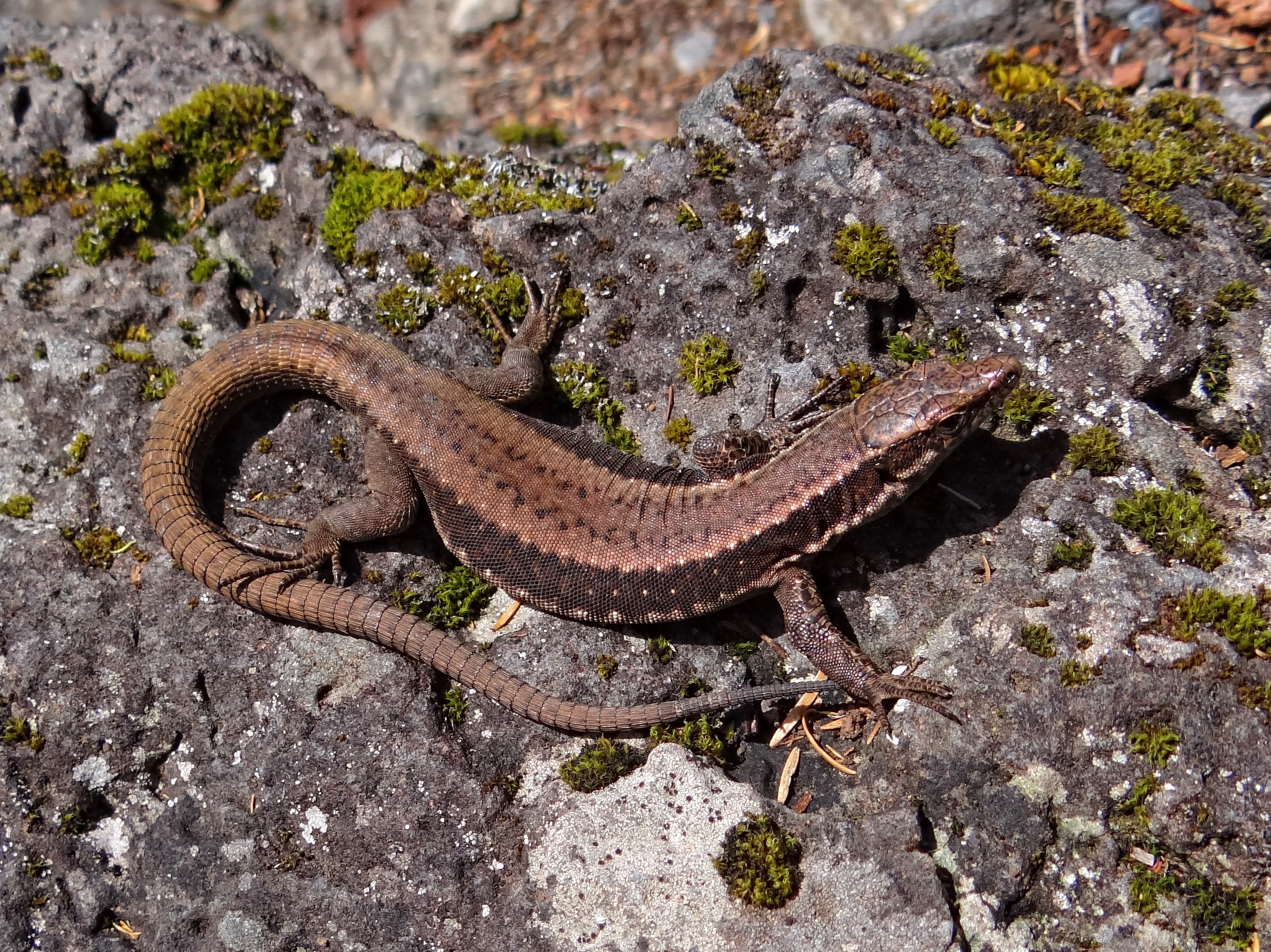
Madeiran wall lizard

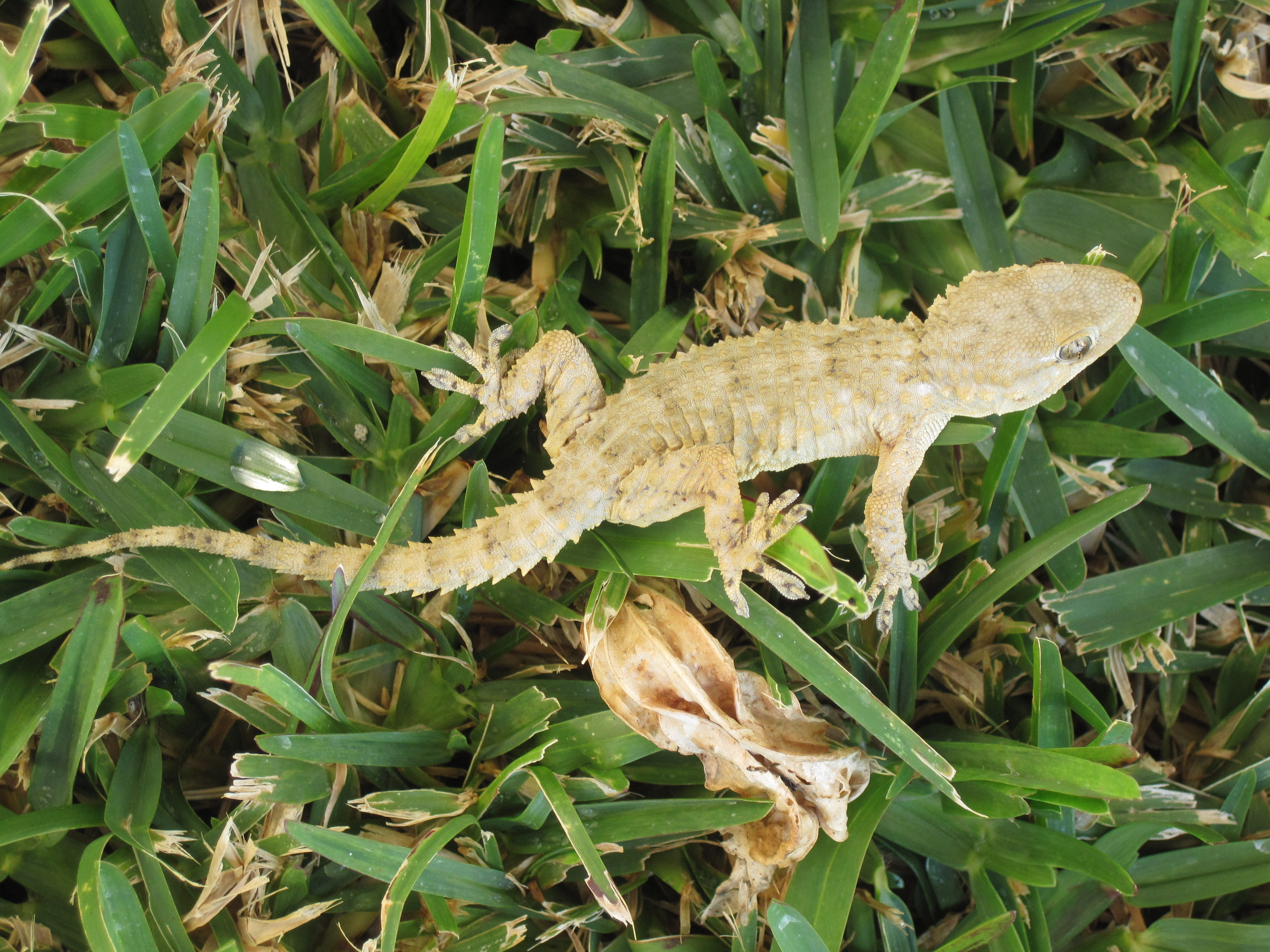
Common wall gecko

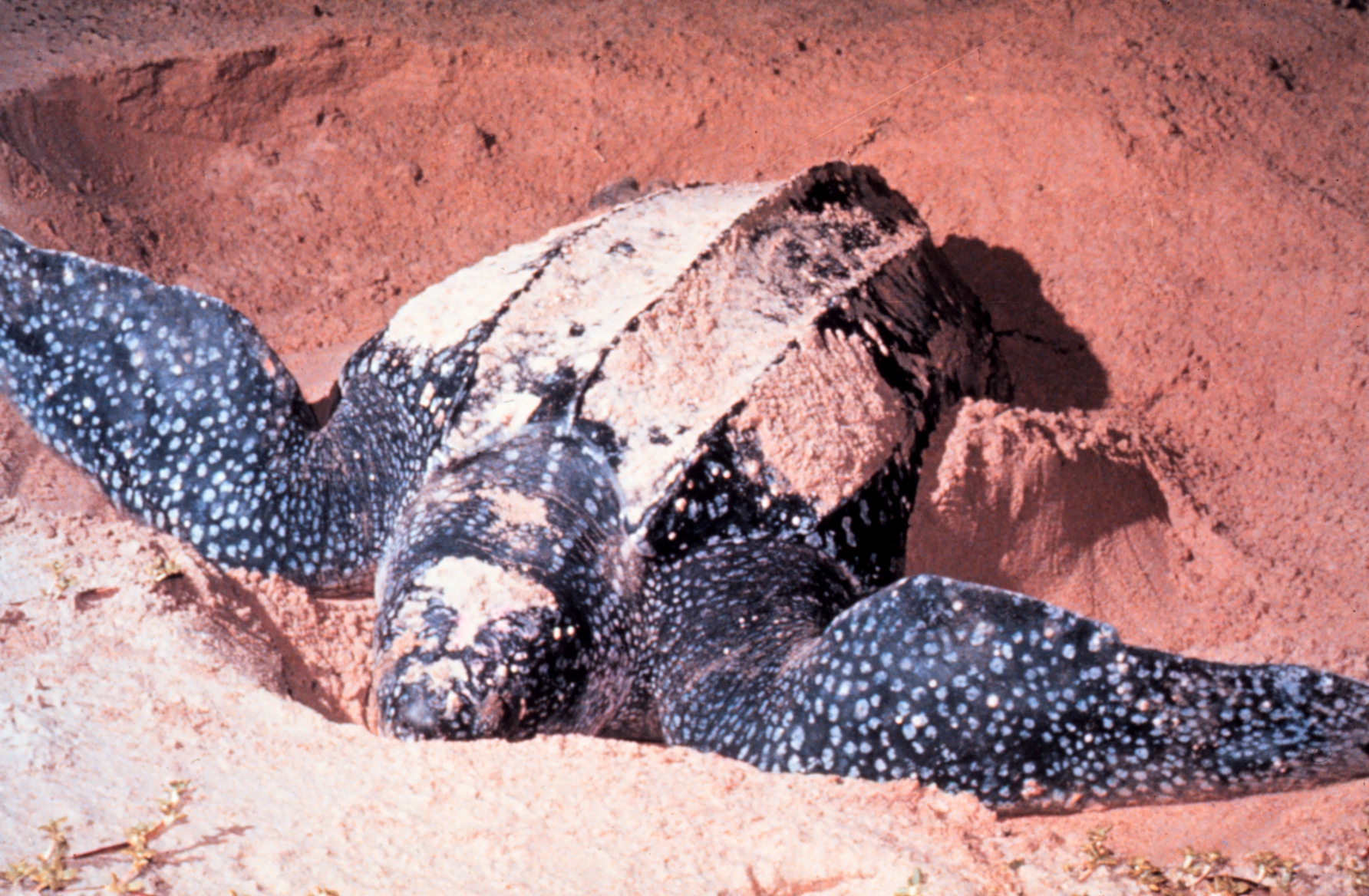
Leatherback sea turtle

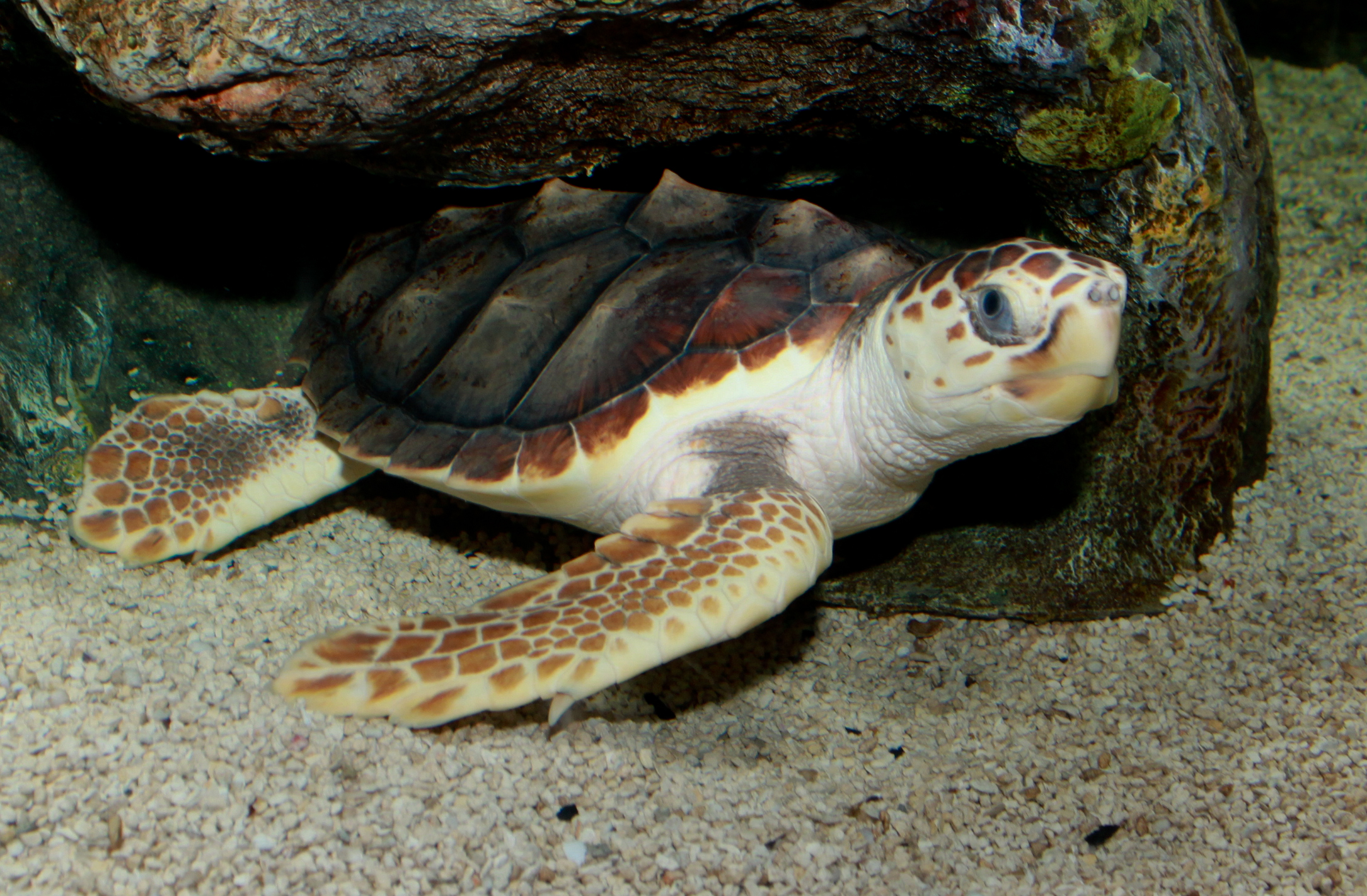
Loggerhead sea turtle

The reptiles that inhabit the Azores archipelago include 2 terrestrial species, as well as 6 species of sea turtles found along the coasts and beaches.

The Madeiran wall lizard was introduced by humans in the mid-19th century. Meanwhile, the common wall gecko was introduced in the late 20th or early 21st century.

== Squamata ==
=== Lacertidae ===
- Madeiran wall lizard (Teira dugesii) LC

=== Phyllodactylidae ===
- Common wall gecko (Tarentola mauritanica) LC

== Testudines ==
=== Dermochelyidae ===
- Leatherback sea turtle (Dermochelys coriacea) VU

=== Cheloniidae ===
- Loggerhead sea turtle (Caretta caretta) VU
- Green sea turtle (Chelonia mydas) LC
- Hawksbill sea turtle (Eretmochelys imbricata) CR
- Kemp's ridley sea turtle (Lepidochelys kempii) CR
- Olive ridley sea turtle (Lepidochelys olivacea) VU

== See also ==
- List of mammals of the Azores
- List of birds of the Azores
- List of amphibians of the Azores
- List of reptiles of the Atlantic Ocean
- List of reptiles of Madeira
- List of reptiles of the Canary Islands
- List of reptiles of Cape Verde
