= Anne Amable Augier du Fot =

French doctor

Anne Amable Augier du Fot (born in Aubusson on 14 March 1733; died in Soissons in 1775) was a French medical doctor. He was known as the author of a book on the "art des accouchements" (which is actually by Jean-Louis Baudelocque). Du Fot was a columnist and wrote on animal epidemiology. He was also an ardent opponent of the Jesuits.

== Bibliography ==
- Review of the Catechism in Dante Lénardon, L'Année littéraire, 1775, IV, p. 136–137
- Nicolas Baudeau (dir.), Ephemerides of the citizen, or Chronicle of the national spirit, Paris, NA Delalain, 1765–1772 — Passim
- Jacques Gélis, The midwife or the doctor: a new conception of life, Fayard, 1988
- Jacques Gélis, The tree ^{and} the fruit: birth in the modern West, 16th – 19th ^{century}, Fayard, 1984
- Joseph Joullietton, History of the Marche and the country of Combrailles, P. Betoulle, 1814, p. 97–98
- Christelle Rabier, “Popularization and diffusion of medicine during the Revolution: the example of surgery”, in Annales historique de la Révolution française, no ^{338} (October–December 2004)
