= List of reptiles of Madeira =

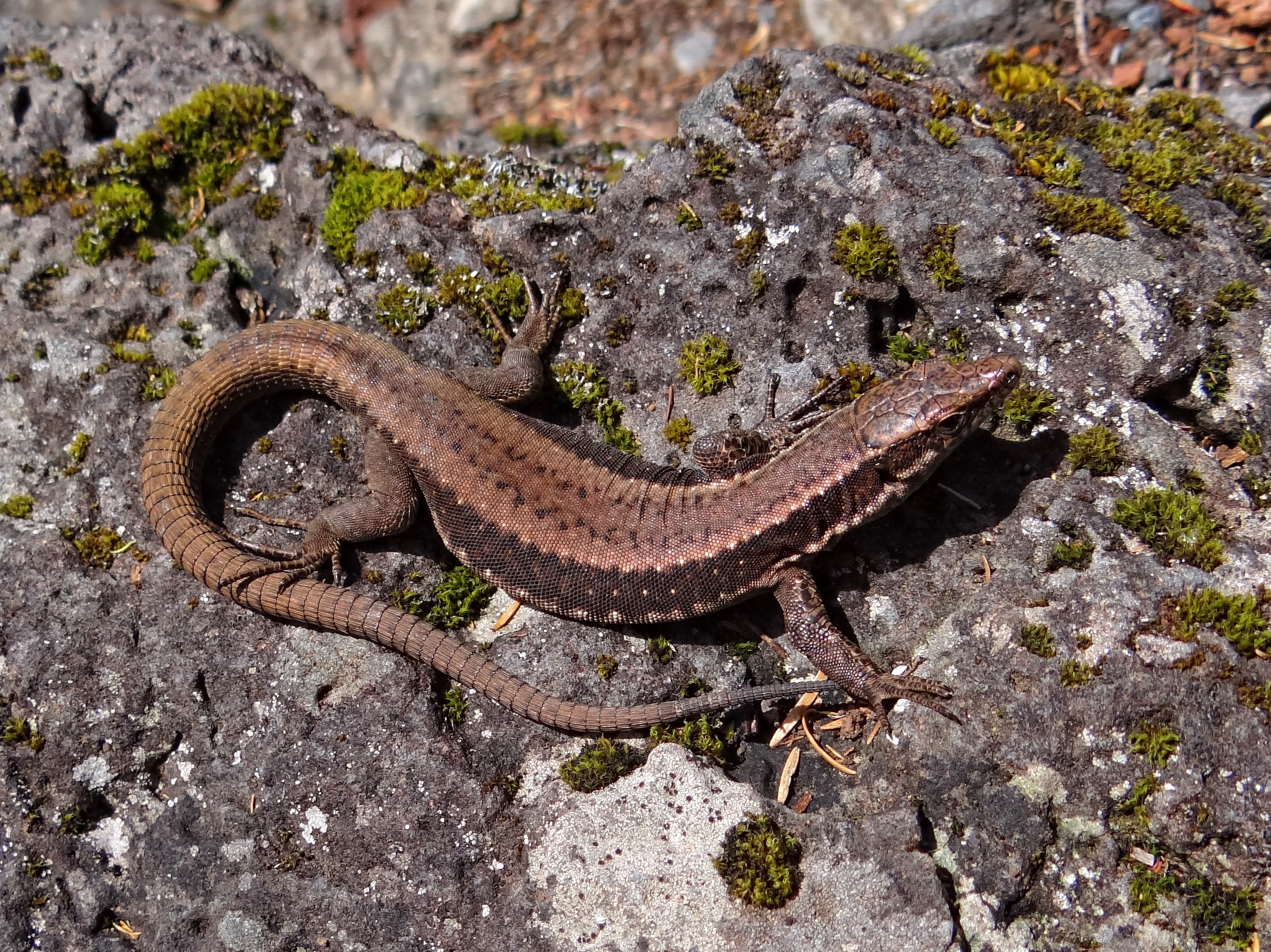
Madeiran wall lizard

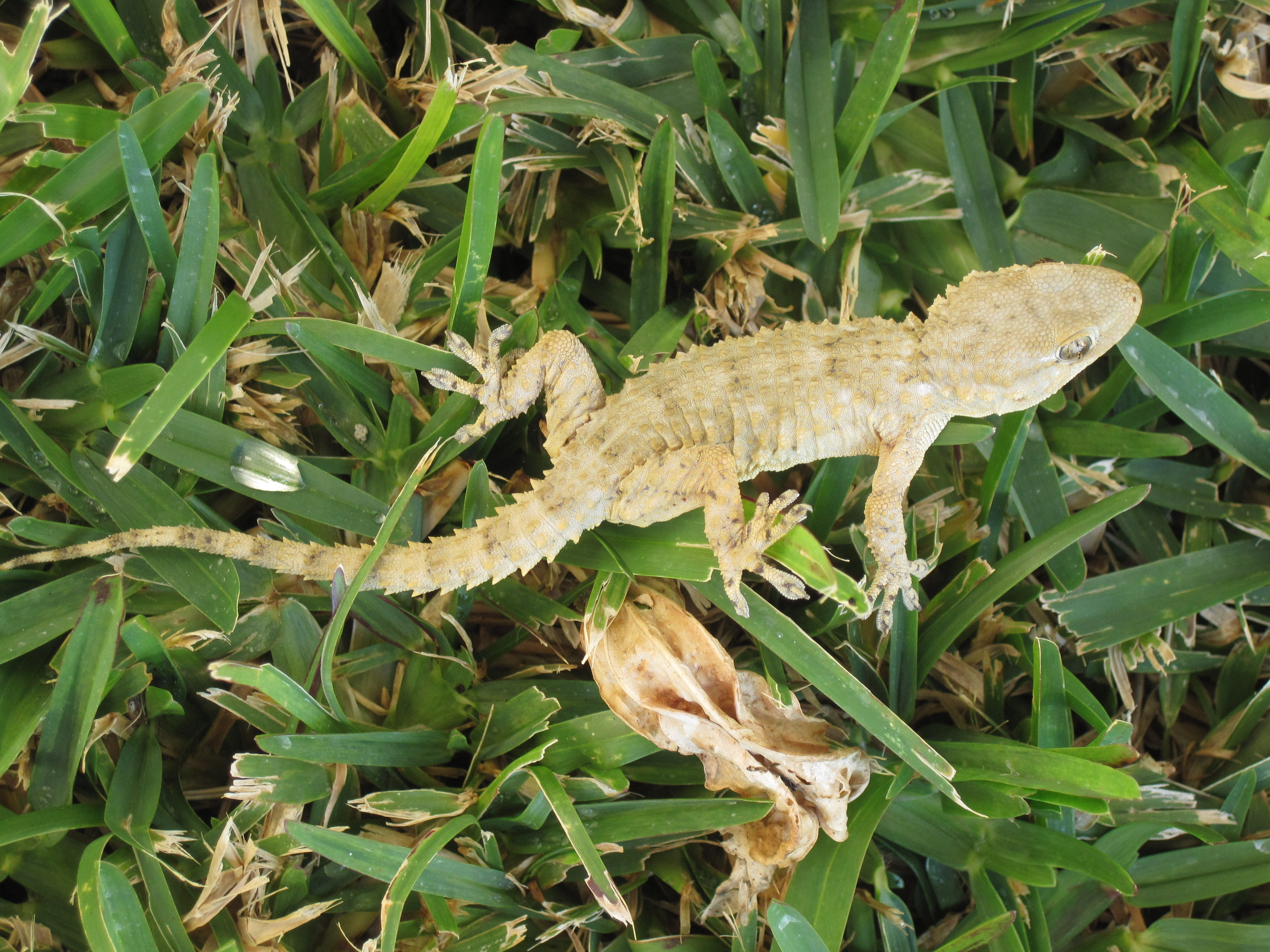
Common wall gecko

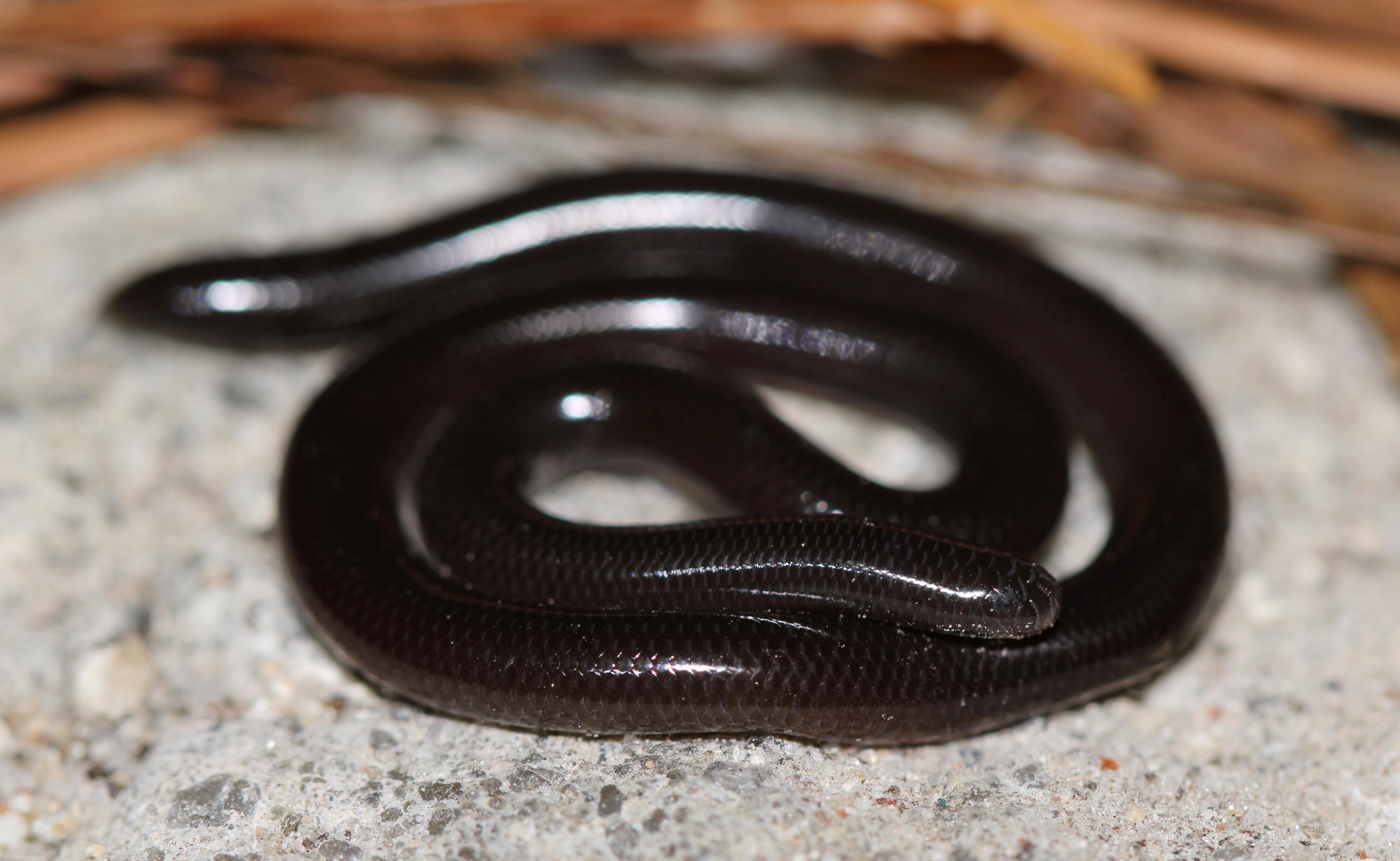
Brahminy blind snake

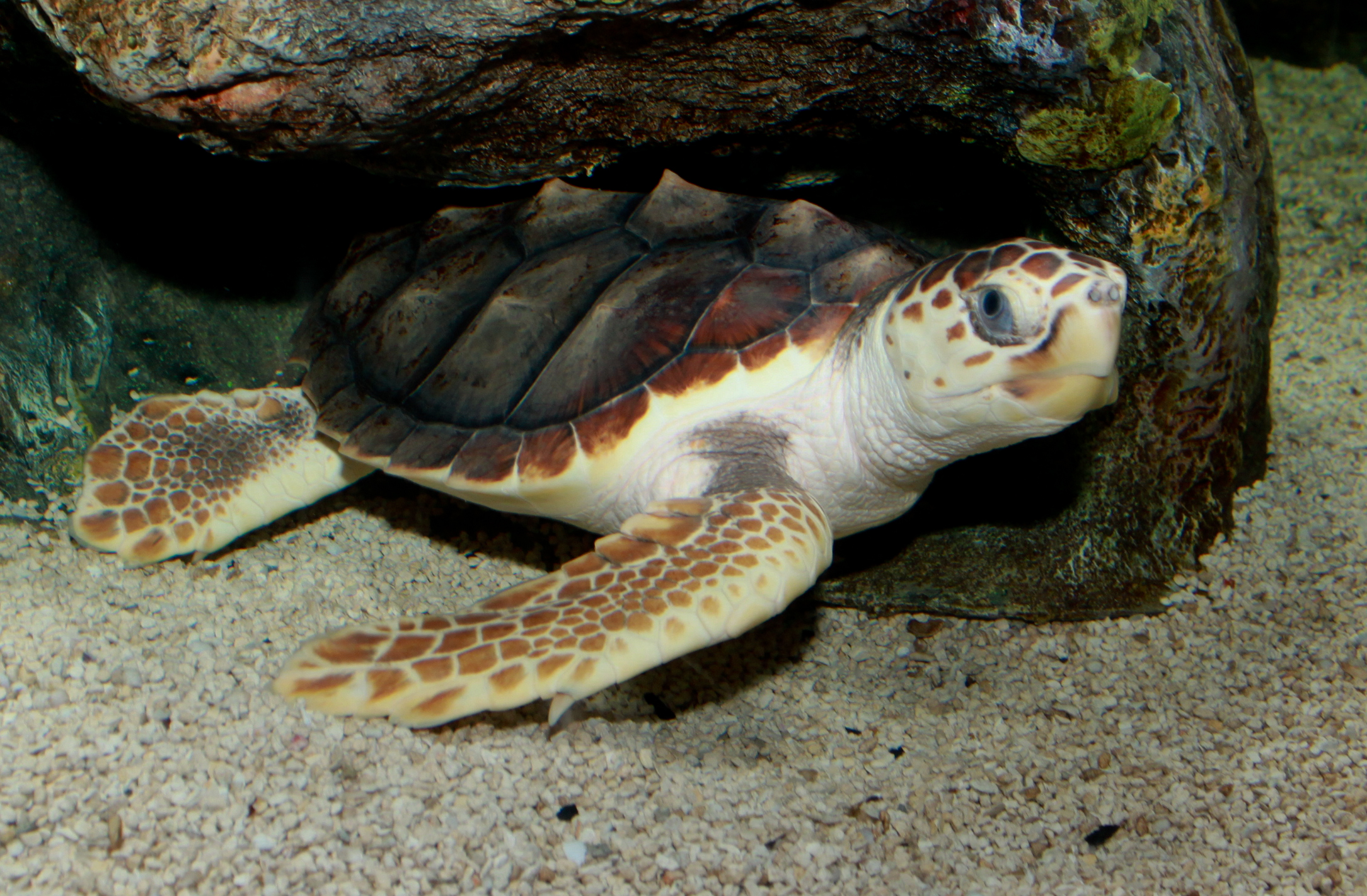
Loggerhead sea turtle

The reptiles that live in the Madeira Archipelago consist of four terrestrial species, in addition to six species of sea turtles found along the coasts and beaches.

The Madeira wall lizard is the only endemic species. It is also naturally present on the Desertas Islands and the Savage Islands. The common wall gecko, the tropical house gecko, and the brahminy blind snake were introduced between the late 20th and early 21st centuries.

== Squamata ==
=== Lacertidae ===
- Madeiran wall lizard (Teira dugesii) LC

=== Gekkonidae ===
- Tropical house gecko (Hemidactylus mabouia) LC

=== Phyllodactylidae ===
- Common wall gecko (Tarentola mauritanica) LC

=== Typhlopidae ===
- Brahminy blind snake (Indotyphlops braminusa) LC

== Testudines ==
=== Dermochelyidae ===
- Leatherback sea turtle (Dermochelys coriacea) VU

=== Cheloniidae ===
- Loggerhead sea turtle (Caretta caretta) VU
- Green sea turtle (Chelonia mydas) LC
- Hawksbill sea turtle (Eretmochelys imbricata) CR
- Kemp's ridley sea turtle (Lepidochelys kempii) CR
- Olive ridley sea turtle (Lepidochelys olivacea) VU

== See also ==
- List of mammals of Madeira
- List of birds of Madeira
- List of amphibians of Madeira
- List of reptiles of the Atlantic Ocean
- List of reptiles of the Azores
- List of reptiles of the Canary Islands
- List of reptiles of Cape Verde
