= Marie-Louise Lachapelle =

18th and 19th-century French midwife

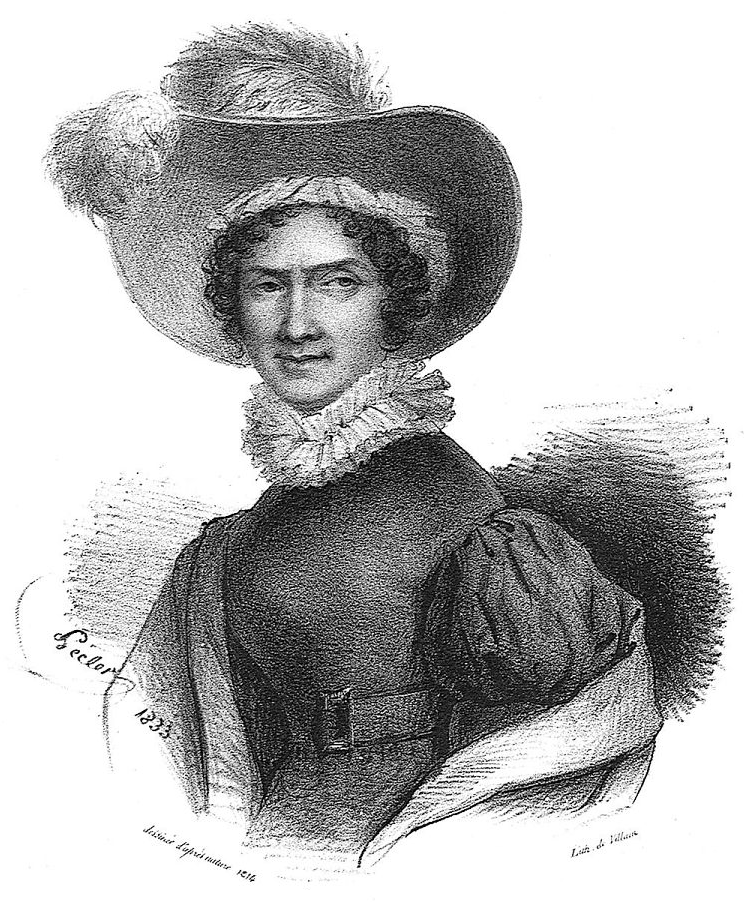
Portrait of Marie-Louise Lachapelle in 1814

Marie-Louise Lachapelle (1 January 1769 – 4 October 1821) was a French midwife, head of obstetrics at the Hôtel-Dieu, the oldest hospital in Paris. She published textbooks about women's bodies, gynecology, and obstetrics. She argued against forceps deliveries and wrote Pratique des accouchements, long a standard obstetric text, which promoted natural deliveries. Lachapelle is generally regarded as the mother of modern obstetrics.

== Life ==
Lachapelle was born in Paris to Marie Jonet, a prominent midwife, and Louis Dugès, a health official, on 1 January 1769. She was the granddaughter and daughter of midwives. She was an only child. Her mother taught her midwifery, which she had learned from her mother, and she quickly became skilled. When she was 15, she performed her first delivery, in which there were complications, although both mother and baby survived thanks to Lachapelle's ministrations. Eight years later, in 1792, she married a surgeon who worked at the Hôpital Saint-Louis. Between 1792 and 1795, she gave birth to a daughter and stopped working. After her husband's death three years after their marriage, she had to support herself and her daughter; so she worked again as a midwife. Her daughter then broke away from family tradition and became a nun.

== Career ==
By the age of twelve, she was performing complicated deliveries, and at fifteen, she was able to perform single-handedly a version that was potentially fatal if handled incorrectly. Not only did she handle a difficult case but she saved both mother and child at the early age of fifteen. While her mother was still alive, Lachapelle had reorganized the maternity ward at the Hôtel-Dieu, and Lachapelle assisted her as an associate chief midwife. The hospital served the poor and was supported by Notre Dame de Paris. It was the premier obstetric hospital of its time and was renowned for its school of midwifery. During 1796 and 1797 she studied obstetrics under Franz Naegele, She was teaching beside professor Jean-Louis Baudelocque at the Hôtel-Dieu.

Baudelocque realized the need for a systematically organized school for midwives. Because of Lachapelle's medical experience and reputation, she was asked by the Minister of the Interior Chaptal to direct the new normal school of midwifery and children's hospital La Maternité which the Napoleonic government established at Port Royal. In order to be a part of the reforms, Lachapelle went to Heidelberg to study, and then returned to Paris, where she became head of the maternity and children's hospital at a newly built teaching hospital, Hospice de la Maternité, an offshoot of the Hôtel-Dieu at Port Royal.

Lachapelle died of stomach cancer on 4 October 1821 after a short illness, her book yet unfinished. The book was finished by her nephew Antoine Louis Dugès, also an obstetrician, who published it in 1825 under the title Pratique des accouchements; ou mémoires et observations choisies, sur les points les plus importants de l'art ("The practice of deliveries; or chosen observations and memories on the most important points of the art"); the book was influential throughout the nineteenth century. In it, she opposed the use of forceps in childbirth for most cases and advocated for minimal intervention by doctors during delivery.

== Teaching ==
Jean-Louis Baudelocque and Lachapelle worked well together and developed a course of study for training midwives. After a year-long course, the students took a rigorous examination, and they would receive a diploma from the Ecole de Medicine if they passed. She also wrote many books as part of her teaching service and improved the hospital care of patients. She taught students of midwifery modern techniques for performing a delivery, by demonstrating potential complications with a model and autopsying women who died in childbirth. Her methods kept disease very low in her hospital. One of her students was the accomplished midwife Marie Boivin. She treated her students like members of her own family, supporting them physically and spiritually. She moved through the wards, going wherever she was most needed, encouraging patients, and patiently teaching staff members. In her teaching, she stressed the importance of noninterference with the birth process unless it was absolutely essential and she opposed the use of forceps except in case of absolute necessity.

== Contribution ==
Lachapelle is credited with several worthwhile innovations in patient care and midwives' training. It is known that she tried to exclude the hordes of observers from the delivery room, that she advised immediate repair of a torn perineum, that in cases of placenta praevia she quickly dilated the mouth of the uterus with tampons and extracted the infant by turning it, thus saving two lives. She also invented a method of deftly turning a face or oblique presentation so that the infant could be born with forceps, and of replacing a protruding arm or shoulder before it was too late.

Lachapelle's work in birthing technique, hygiene, and education at La Maternité comprised the majority of her career, where she worked alongside her friend Dr. Jean-Louis Baudelocque, who was in charge of the theoretical part. Lachapelle also made strides in the hygiene practices of the hospital; her efforts to reduce child mortality rates were quite successful, including her restrictions on visitors. Throughout her career, she delivered approximately 40,000 babies; this experience led her to begin writing a textbook on midwifery and obstetrics. Her greatest innovation lay in realizing the value of collecting statistics on great numbers of cases. She also published five case histories in 1819, in the Annuaire Médico-Chirurgical, Observations sur divers cas d'accouchements (rupture du vagin; présentation de la face; issue prématurée du cordon; accouchement précédé de convulsions ("Observations on various delivery cases"). In her three-volume treatise, she introduced an improved classification of fetal positions, reducing Baudelocque's 94 positions to 22. She always insisted on minimum use of instruments. Her tables settled many questions still debated in obstetrics up to her time: average length of pregnancy, the average duration of labor; frequency of certain pelvic abnormalities, etc.

== Publications ==
- Lachapelle, Marie-Louise (1821). Pratique des accouchemens ou Mémoires et observations choisies, sur les points les plus importans de l'art (in French). Paris: J.B. Baillière. (volume 1, volume 2, volume 3; Retrieved 6 February 2013.)

She also wrote articles recording her observations for the periodical Annuaire Medico-Chirurgical and furnished statistics for the members of the conseil d'administration des hospices.

== Honors ==
- Doctor of medicine degree from a German university

== Sources ==
=== References ===
- Alic, Margaret (1999), "Marie-Louise (Dugès) Lachapelle", in Proffitt, Pamela (ed.), Notable Women Scientists, Gale Group, ISBN 0-7876-3900-1
- Burton, June (2007), Napoleon and the Woman Question: Discourses of the Other Sex in French Education, Medicine, and Medical Law 1799–1815, Texas Tech University Press
- Oakes, Elizabeth H. (2002), International Encyclopedia of Women Scientists, Facts On File, ISBN 0-8160-4381-7
- Ogilvie, Marilyn; Harvey, Joy (2000), The Biographical Dictionary of Women in Science, ISBN 0-415-92040-X
- Stanley, Autumn (1995), Mothers and Daughters of Invention: Notes for a Revised History of Technology, Rutgers University Press
- Annuaire médico-chirurgical des hopitaux et hospices civils de Paris, Paris: Crochard, 1819
- Delacoux, Aloïs (1833), "Lachapelle (Marie-Louise Dugès, veuve)", Biographies des sages-femmes célèbres anciennes, modernes et contemporaines (in French), Paris: Trinquart, pp. 97–106
