= List of mammals of Madeira =

This is a list of indigenous mammals of the Portuguese archipelago of Madeira in the North Atlantic ocean. Besides the mammals on the islands, the coastal waters are host to at least nine species of dolphins and ten species of migrating cetaceans. These are protected in the 430,000 km^{2} Madeiran Marine Mammal Sanctuary.

== Conservation status listing and ranking system ==
The following tags are used to highlight each species' conservation status as assessed by the International Union for Conservation of Nature:

EX	Extinct	No reasonable doubt that the last individual has died.
EW	Extinct in the wild	Known only to survive in captivity or as a naturalized populations well outside its previous range.
CR	Critically endangered	The species is in imminent risk of extinction in the wild.
EN	Endangered	The species is facing an extremely high risk of extinction in the wild.
VU	Vulnerable	The species is facing a high risk of extinction in the wild.
NT	Near threatened	The species does not meet any of the criteria that would categorise it as risking extinction but it is likely to do so in the future.
LC	Least concern	There are no current identifiable risks to the species.
DD	Data deficient	There is inadequate information to make an assessment of the risks to this species.

== Order: Chiroptera (bats) ==
The bats' most distinguishing feature is that their forelimbs are developed as wings, making them the only mammals capable of flight. Bat species account for about 20% of all mammals.

- Family: Vespertilionidae
  - Genus: Pipistrellus
    - Madeira pipistrelle, P. maderensis VU
  - Genus: Nyctalus
    - Lesser noctule, Nyctalus leisleri verrucosus LC
  - Genus: Plecotus
    - Grey long-eared bat, Plecotus austriacus LC

== Order: Carnivora (carnivorans) ==
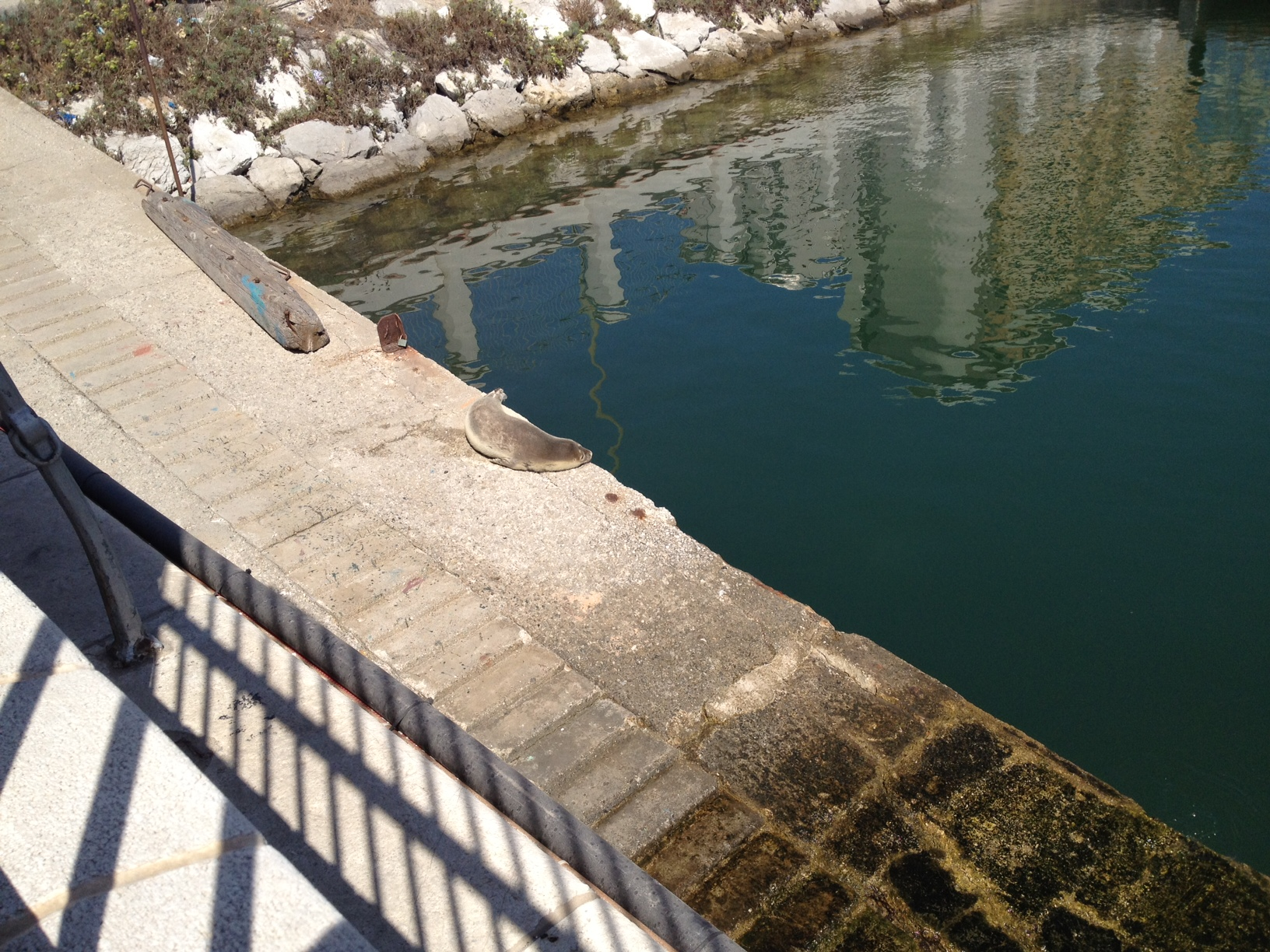
A Mediterranean monk seal resting on a slipway

Carnivorans include over 260 species, the majority of which eat meat as their primary dietary item. They have a characteristic skull shape and dentition.

- Suborder: Pinnipedia
  - Family: Phocidae
    - Genus: Monachus
      - Mediterranean monk seal, M. monachus EN

== Order: Cetacea (whales) ==
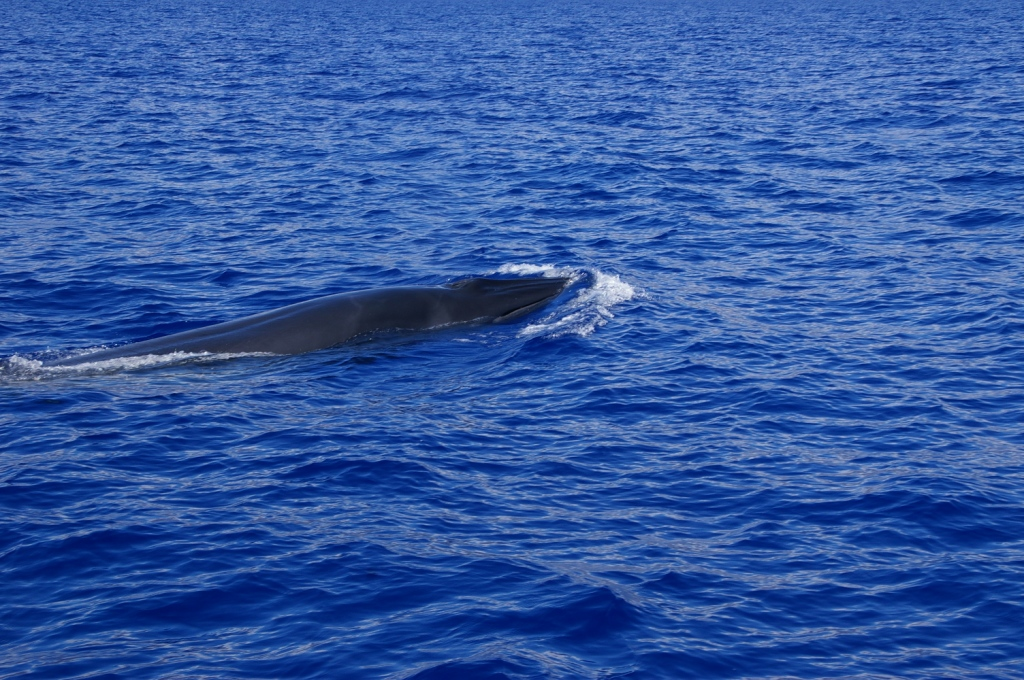
A Bryde's whale surfacing off Madeira during one of whale watching tours

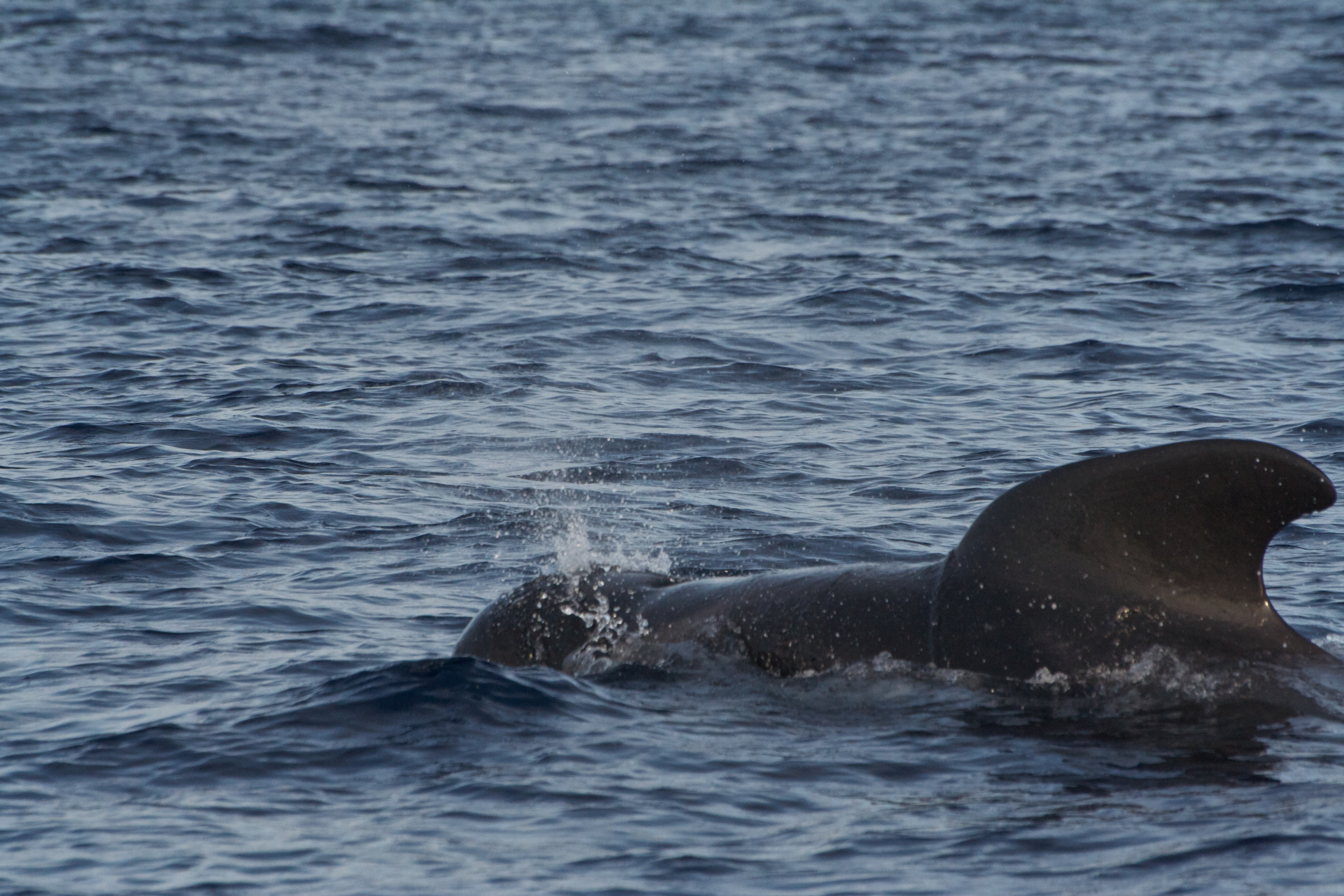
A short-finned pilot whale breathing off Madeira

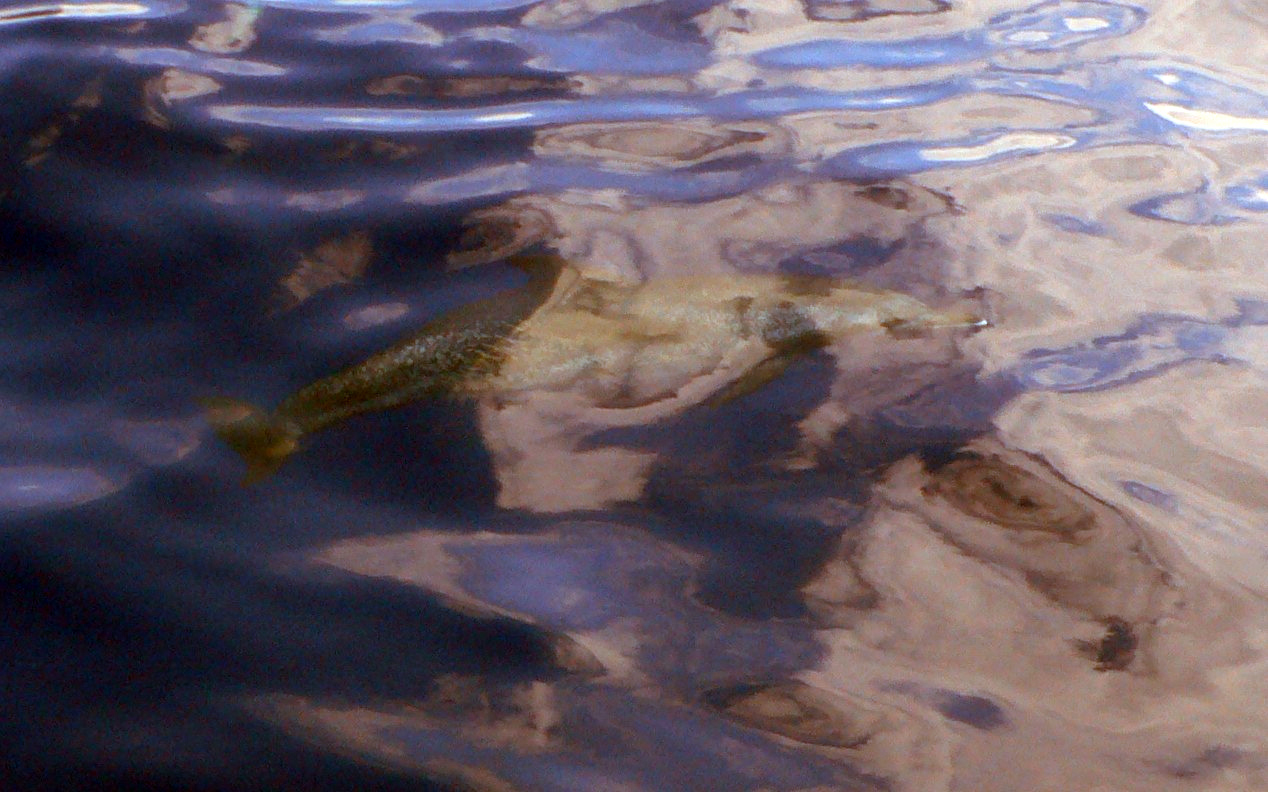
An Atlantic spotted dolphin swims near water surface off Madeira

The order Cetacea includes whales, dolphins and porpoises. They are the mammals most fully adapted to aquatic life with a spindle-shaped nearly hairless body, protected by a thick layer of blubber, and forelimbs and tail modified to provide propulsion underwater.

- Suborder: Mysticeti
  - Family: Balaenidae
    - Genus: Eubalaena
      - North Atlantic right whale, Eubalaena glacialis CR
  - Family: Balaenopteridae
    - Subfamily: Balaenopterinae
      - Genus: Balaenoptera
        - Blue whale, Balaenoptera musculus EN
        - Fin whale, Balaenoptera physalus VU
        - Sei whale, Balaenoptera borealis EN
        - Minke whale, Balaenoptera acutorostrata LC
    - Subfamily: Megapterinae
      - Genus: Megaptera
        - Humpback whale, Megaptera novaeangliae LC
- Suborder: Odontoceti
  - Superfamily: Physeteroidea
    - Family: Physeteridae
      - Genus: Physeter
        - Sperm whale, Physeter macrocephalus VU
    - Family: Kogiidae
      - Genus: Kogia
        - Pygmy sperm whale, Kogia breviceps DD>
  - Superfamily: Delphinoidea
    - Family: Delphinidae (marine dolphins)
      - Genus: Tursiops
        - Common bottlenose dolphin, Tursiops truncatus LC
      - Genus: Steno
        - Rough-toothed dolphin, Steno bredanensis LC

== See also ==
- Lists of mammals by region
- List of birds of Madeira
- List of reptiles of Madeira
- List of amphibians of Madeira
