= List of mammals of the Azores =

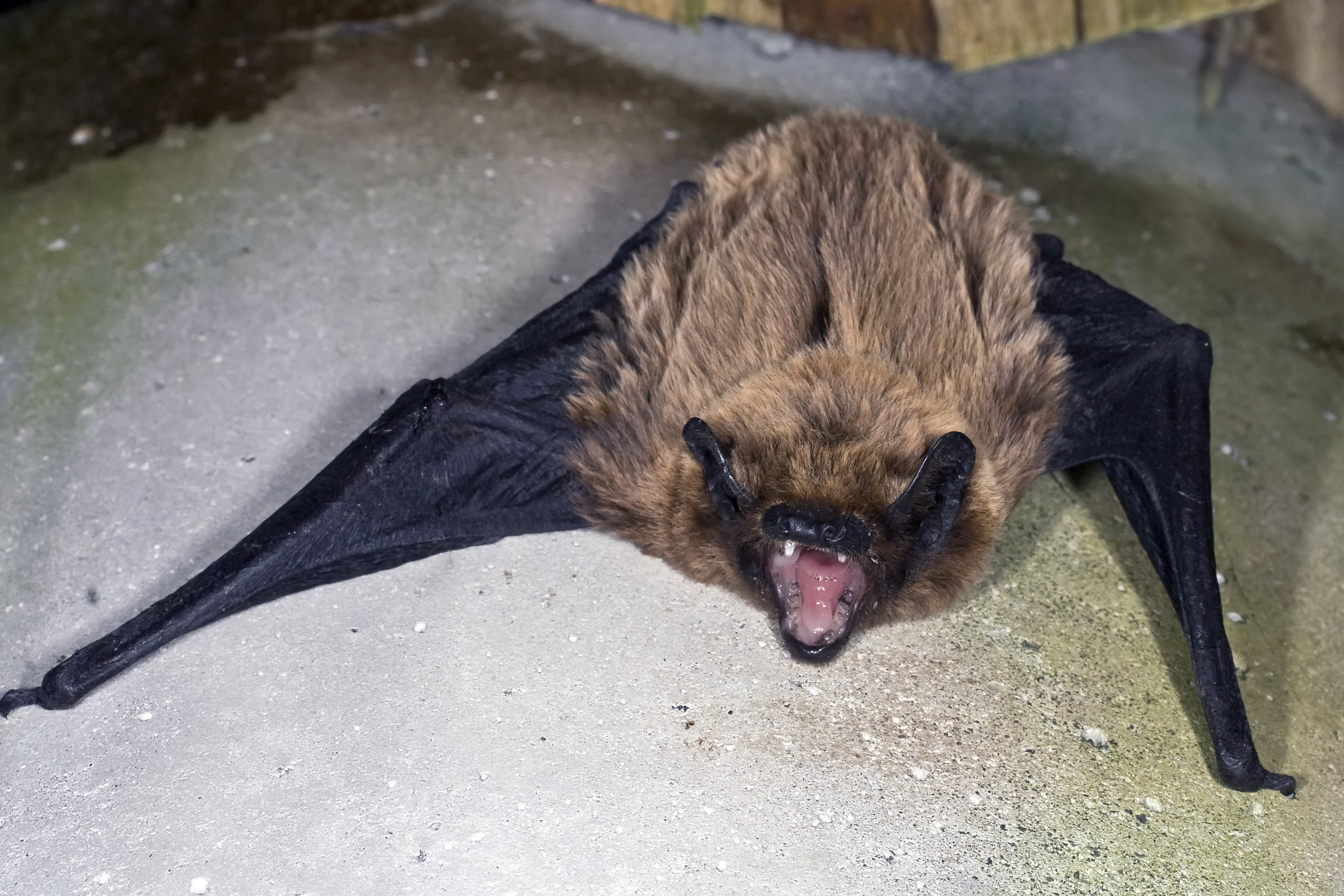
The endemic Azores noctule (Nyctalus azoreum) is, along with the greater mouse-eared bat (Myotis myotis), the only current native mammal of the Azores that is not a marine mammal.

This is a list of the mammal species recorded in the Azores Islands, Portugal. Except for marine mammals and two species of bats, the Azores were completely devoid of mammals prior to their discovery in the early 15th century. All other mammals in the islands are therefore introduced species.

The following tags are used to highlight each species' conservation status as assessed by the International Union for Conservation of Nature.

EX	Extinct	No reasonable doubt that the last individual has died.
EW	Extinct in the wild	Known only to survive in captivity or as a naturalized populations well outside its previous range.
CR	Critically endangered	The species is in imminent risk of extinction in the wild.
EN	Endangered	The species is facing an extremely high risk of extinction in the wild.
VU	Vulnerable	The species is facing a high risk of extinction in the wild.
NT	Near threatened	The species does not meet any of the criteria that would categorise it as risking extinction but it is likely to do so in the future.
LC	Least concern	There are no current identifiable risks to the species.
DD	Data deficient	There is inadequate information to make an assessment of the risks to this species.

== Order: Rodentia (rodents) ==
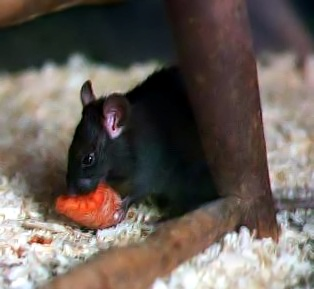
Black rat

Rodents make up the largest order of mammals, with over 40% of mammalian species. They have two incisors in the upper and lower jaw which grow continually and must be kept short by gnawing. Most rodents are small though the capybara can weigh up to 45 kg (99 lb).

- Suborder: Myomorpha
  - Family: Muridae (mice and rats)
    - Subfamily: Murinae
      - Genus: Mus
        - House mouse, Mus musculus LC introduced
      - Genus: Rattus
        - Brown rat, Rattus norvegicus NA introduced
        - Black rat, Rattus rattus LC introduced

== Order: Erinaceomorpha (hedgehogs and gymnures) ==
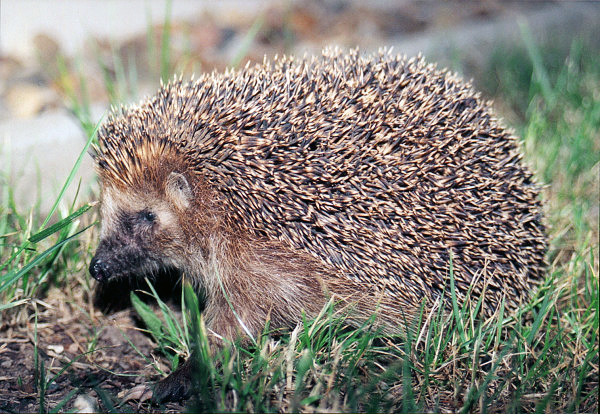
European hedgehog

The order Erinaceomorpha contains a single family, Erinaceidae, which comprise the hedgehogs and gymnures. The hedgehogs are easily recognised by their spines while gymnures look more like large rats.

- Family: Erinaceidae (hedgehogs)
  - Subfamily: Erinaceinae
    - Genus: Erinaceus
      - European hedgehog, E. europaeus LC

== Order: Chiroptera (bats) ==
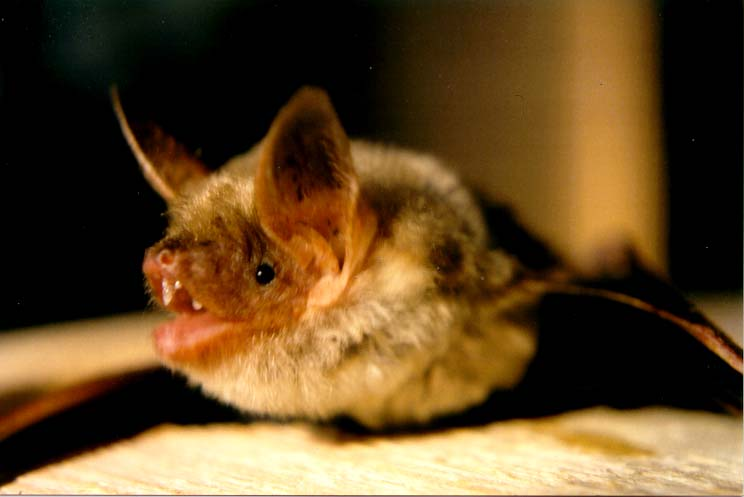
Greater mouse-eared bat

The bats' most distinguishing feature is that their forelimbs are developed as wings, making them the only mammals capable of flight. Bat species account for about 20% of all mammals.

- Family: Vespertilionidae (mouse-eared bats)
  - Subfamily: Myotinae
    - Genus: Myotis
      - Greater mouse-eared bat, Myotis myotis LC
  - Subfamily: Verpertilioninae
    - Genus: Nyctalus
      - Azores noctule, Nyctalus azoreum VU

== Order: Cetacea (whales) ==
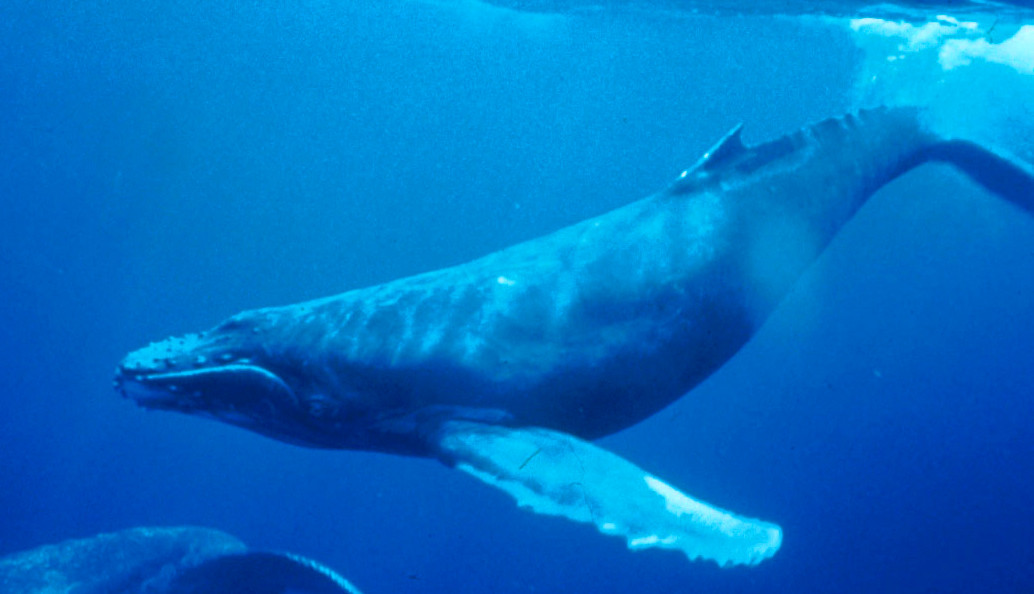
Humpback whale

Killer whales

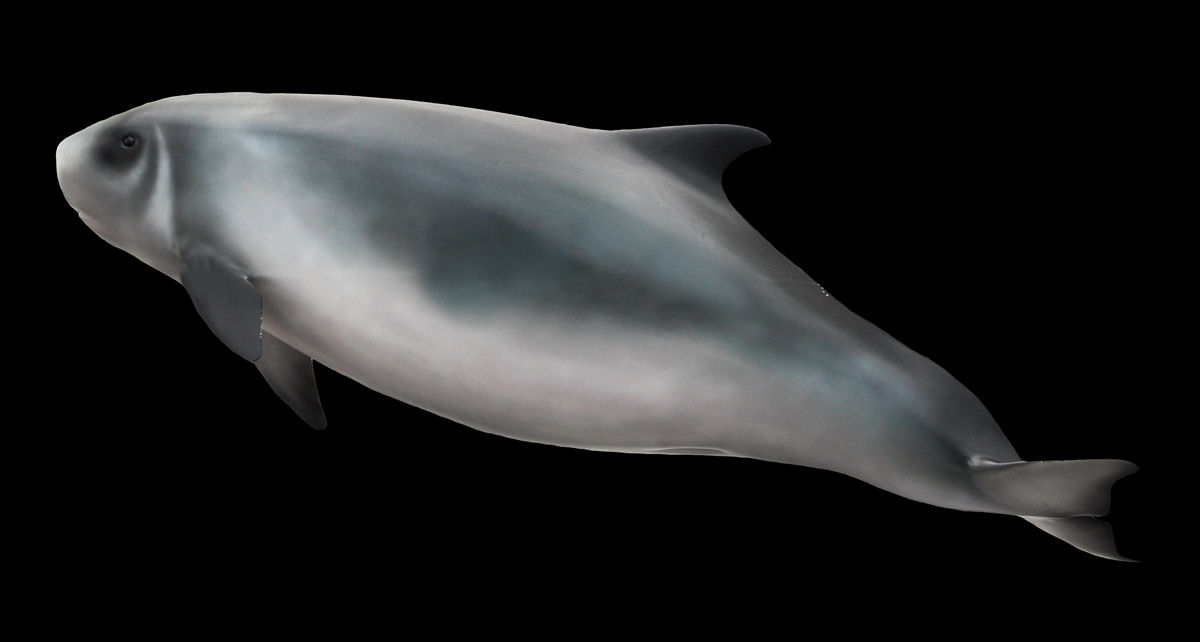
Dwarf sperm whale

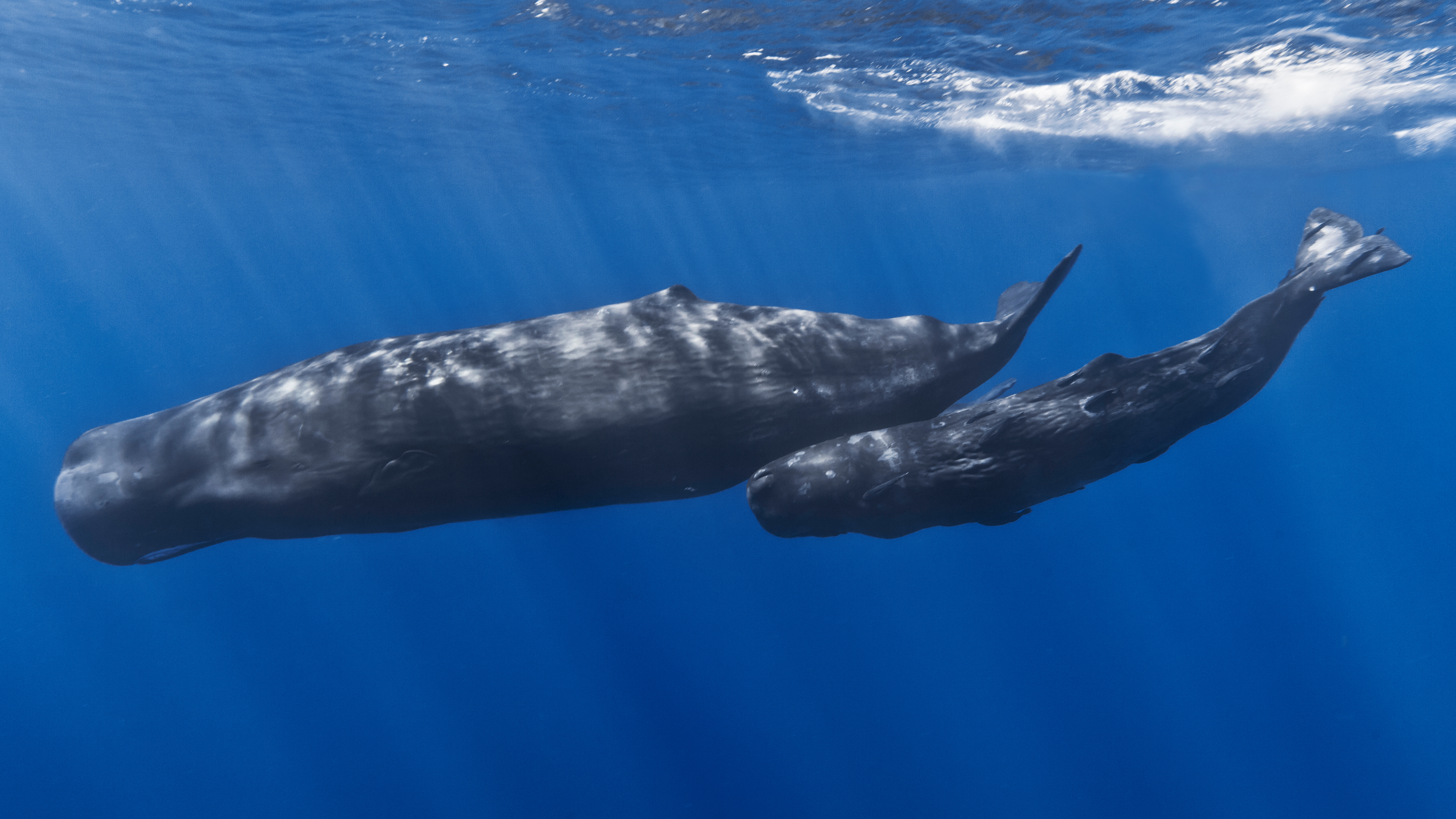
Sperm whale and calf

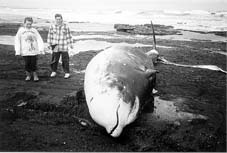
A stranded Cuvier's beaked whale

The order Cetacea includes whales, dolphins and porpoises. They are the mammals most fully adapted to aquatic life with a spindle-shaped nearly hairless body, protected by a thick layer of blubber, and forelimbs and tail modified to provide propulsion underwater. Many species of cetaceans reproduce around the Azores.

- Suborder: Mysticeti
  - Family: Balaenidae
    - Genus: Eubalaena
      - North Atlantic right whale, Eubalaena glacialis CR
  - Family: Balaenopteridae (rorquals)
    - Genus: Balaenoptera
      - Northern minke whale, Balaenoptera acutorostrata LC
      - Sei whale, Balaenoptera borealis EN
      - Blue whale, Balaenoptera musculus EN
      - Fin whale, Balaenoptera physalus NT
    - Genus: Megaptera
      - Humpback whale, Megaptera novaeangliae LC
- Suborder: Odontoceti
  - Family: Delphinidae (dolphins and pilot whales)
    - Genus: Globicephala
      - Short-finned pilot whale, Globicephala macrorhyncus DD
      - Long-finned pilot whale, Globicephala melas DD
    - Genus: Grampus
      - Risso's dolphin, Grampus griseus DD
    - Genus: Orcinus
      - Killer whale, Orcinus orca DD
    - Genus: Stenella
      - Striped dolphin, Stenella coeruleoalba DD
      - Atlantic spotted dolphin, Stenella frontalis DD
    - Genus: Tursiops
      - Common bottlenose dolphin, Tursiops truncatus DD
  - Family: Kogiidae (small sperm whales)
    - Genus: Kogia
      - Pygmy sperm whale, Kogia breviceps DD
      - Dwarf sperm whale, Kogia sima DD
  - Family: Physeteridae (sperm whales)
    - Genus: Physeter
      - Sperm whale, Physeter macrocephalus VU
  - Family: Ziphiidae (beaked whales)
    - Genus: Hyperoodon
      - Northern bottlenose whale, Hyperoodon ampullatus DD
    - Genus: Mesoplodon
      - Sowerby's beaked whale, Mesoplodon bidens DD
      - Blainville's beaked whale, Mesoplodon densirostris DD
      - Gervais' beaked whale, Mesoplodon europaeus DD
      - True's beaked whale, Mesoplodon mirus DD
    - Genus: Ziphius
      - Cuvier's beaked whale, Ziphius cavirostris DD

== Order: Carnivora (carnivorans) ==
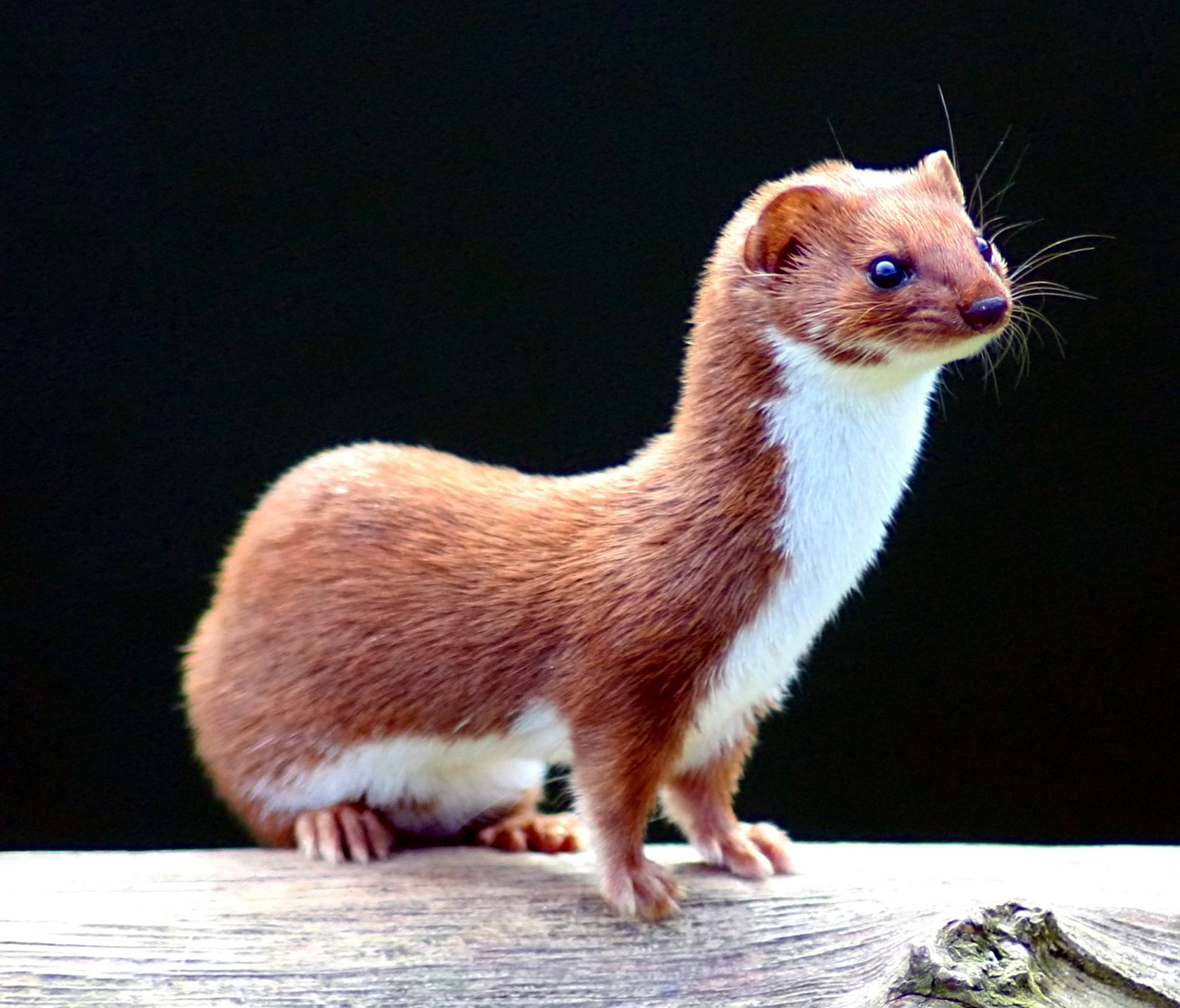
Least weasel

There are over 260 species of carnivorans, the majority of which feed primarily on meat. They have a characteristic skull shape and dentition.

- Suborder: Caniformia
  - Family: Mustelidae (mustelids)
    - Genus: Mustela
      - Least weasel, Mustela nivalis LC
  - Family: Phocidae (earless seals)
    - Genus: Monachus
      - Mediterranean monk seal, Monachus monachus EN

== See also ==
- List of chordate orders
- Lists of mammals by region
- List of prehistoric mammals
- Mammal classification
- List of mammals described in the 2000s
- List of birds of the Azores
- List of reptiles of the Azores
- List of amphibians of the Azores
