= List of amphibians of Madeira =

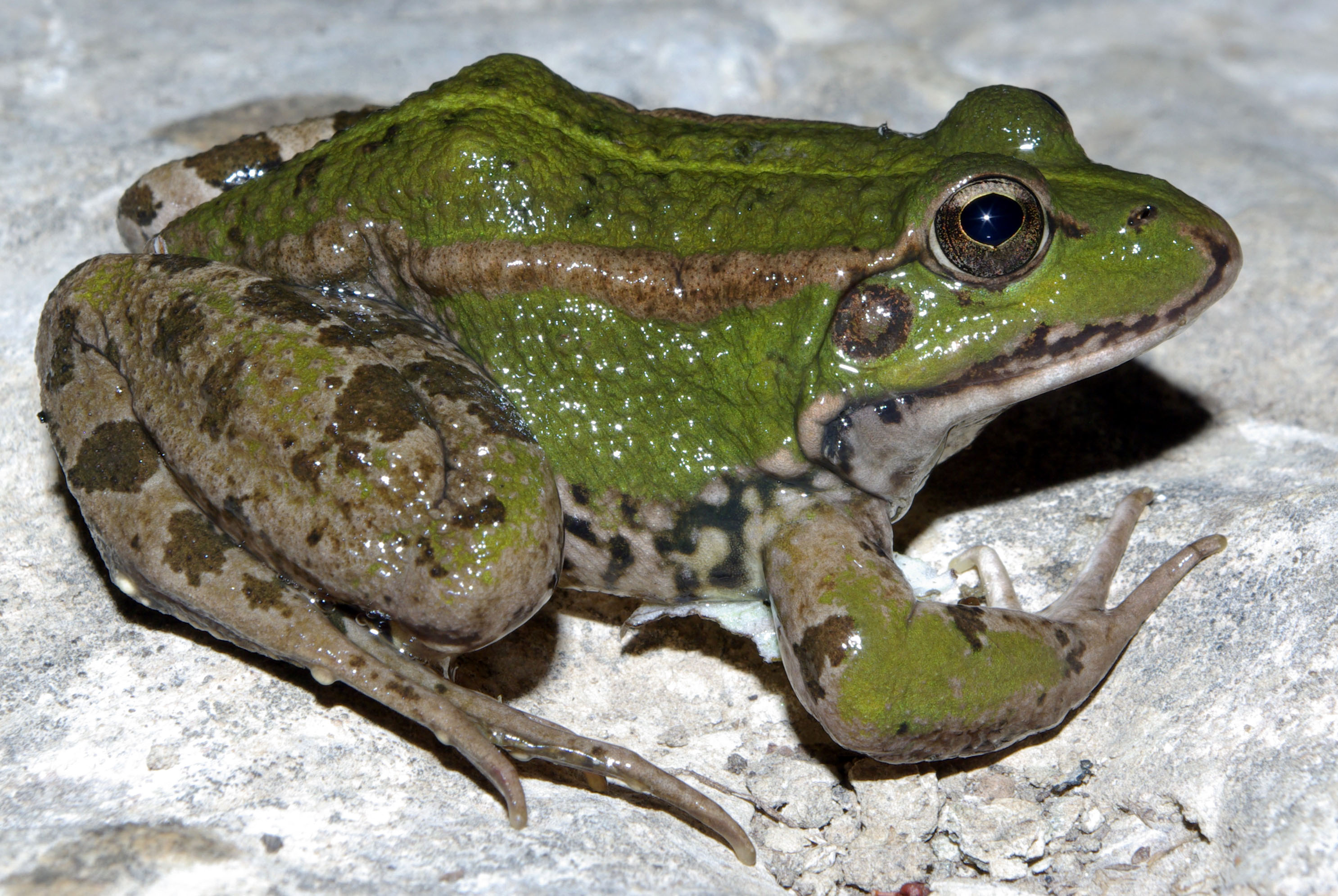
Iberian green frog.

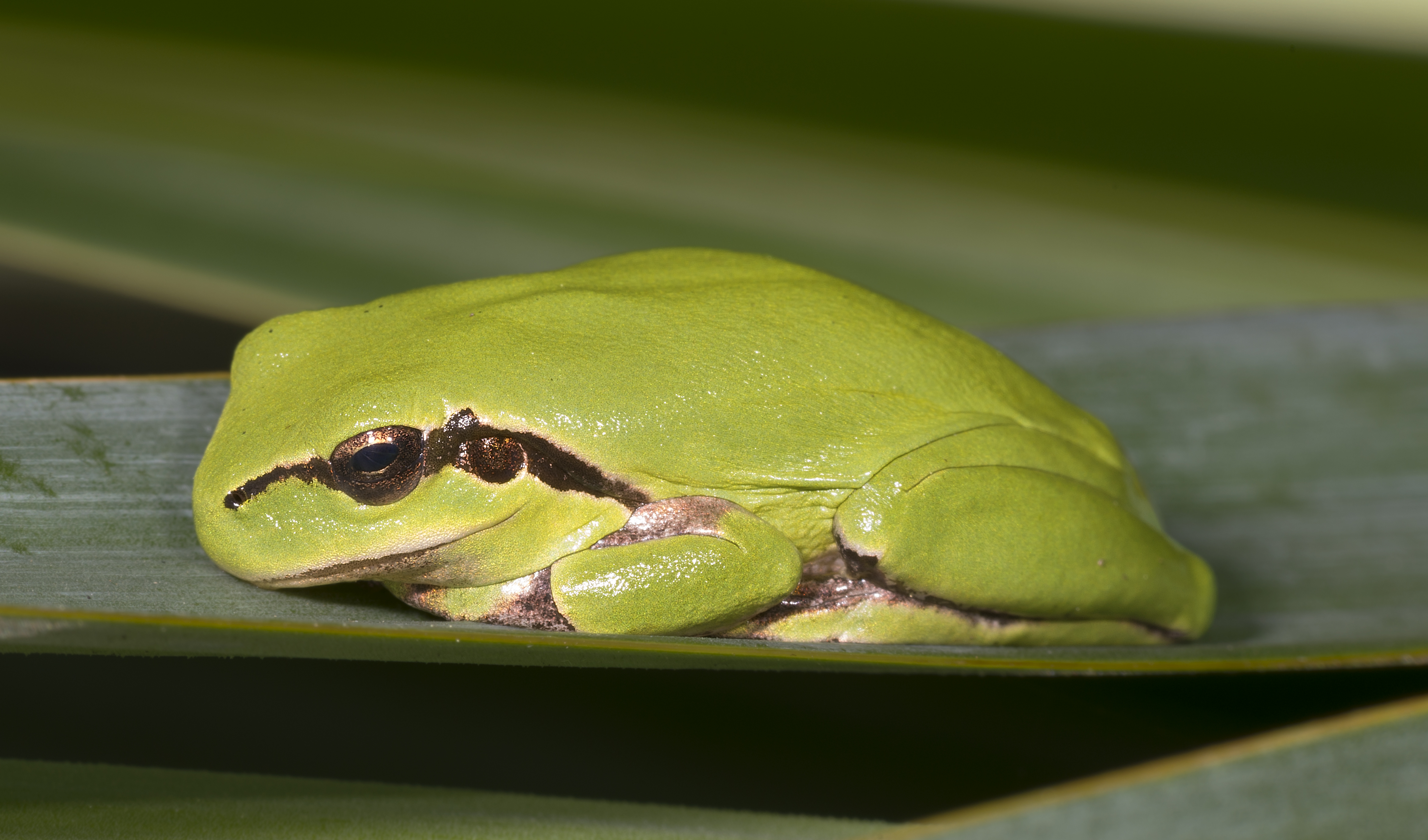
The Mediterranean tree frog is now possibly extinct in Madeira.

At present, there is only one confirmed amphibian species in the Madeira archipelago, the Iberian green frog, probably introduced during the 19th century.

However, there was also an introduced population of the Mediterranean tree frog dating from the 19th century, which is now possibly extinct for unknown reasons.

== Anura ==
=== Ranidae ===
- Iberian green frog (Pelophylax perezi) LC

=== Hylidae ===
- Mediterranean tree frog (Hyla meridionalis) EX

== See also ==
- List of mammals of Madeira
- List of birds of Madeira
- List of reptiles of Madeira
- List of amphibians of the Azores
- List of amphibians of the Canary Islands
- List of amphibians of Cape Verde
