= Marie Boivin =

French midwife, inventor and writer (1773–1841)

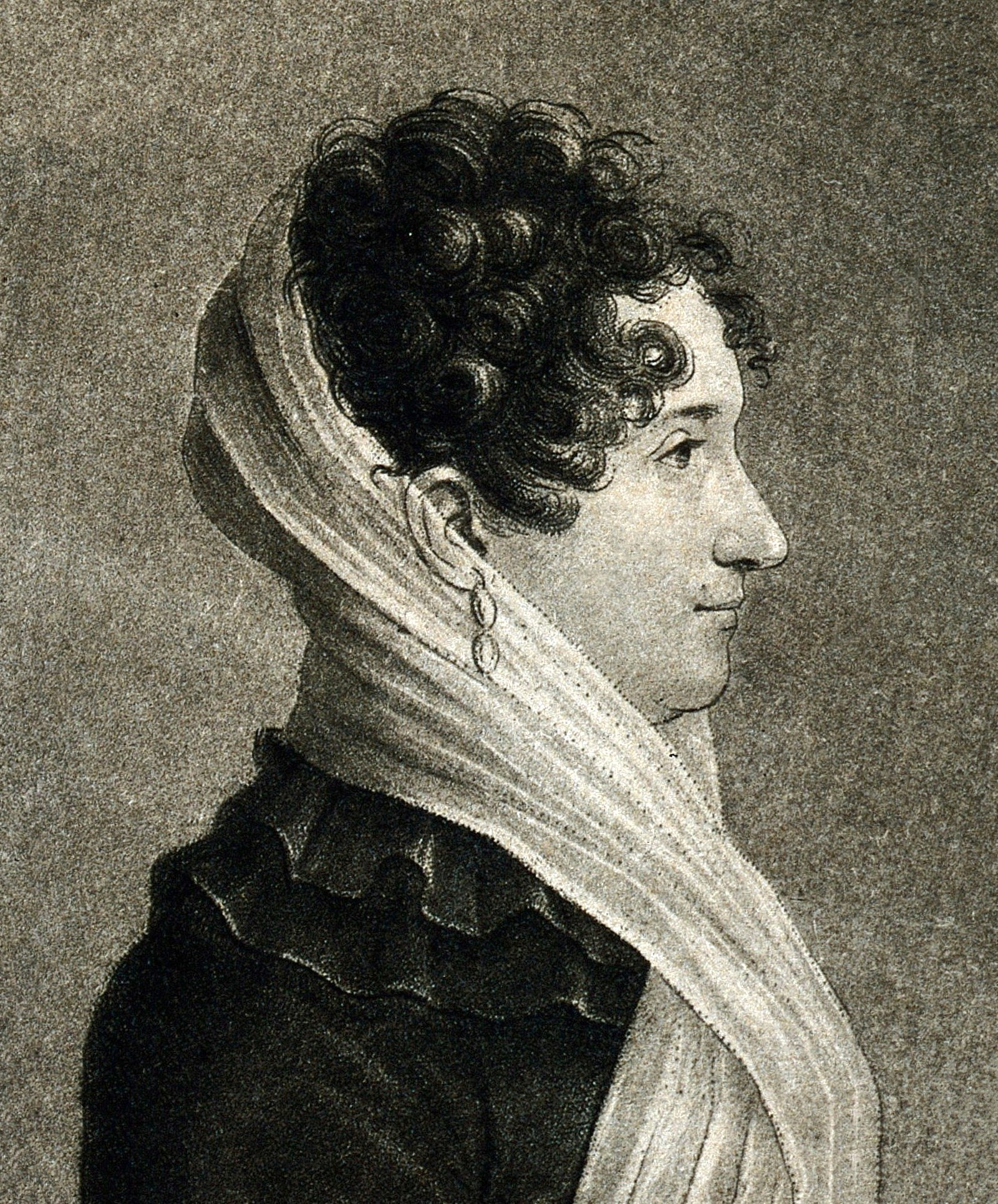
- Born: 9 April 1773
- Died: 16 May 1841 (aged 68)

Marie-Anne Victoire Boivin (French pronunciation: [maʁi bwavɛ̃]; née Gillain; 9 April 1773 – 16 May 1841) was a French midwife, inventor, and obstetrics writer. Madame Boivin has been called one of the most important women in medicine in the 19th century. Boivin invented a new pelvimeter and a vaginal speculum, and the medical textbooks that she wrote were translated to different languages and became highly influential.

== Biography and career ==
Marie Anne Victoire Gillain was born in 1773 at Versailles. She was educated by nursing nuns at a nunnery in Étampes, where her talents attracted the attention of Madame Élisabeth, sister of Louis XVI. When the nunnery was destroyed during the French Revolution, she spent three years studying anatomy and midwifery.

Her medical studies were interrupted when she married a government bureaucrat, Louis Boivin, in 1797. Louis Boivin died shortly thereafter, leaving her with a daughter and little money.

She returned to Paris to study in the medical field and became Marie-Louise Lachapelle's student, assistant, and friend at La Maternité. She received her diploma in 1800, and stayed at Versailles to practice. She became a midwife at a local hospital, and in 1801 became its superintendent. In that role she convinced Jean-Antoine Chaptal to add a special school of obstetrics. During that time, Mme Boivin developed a close relationship with Dr. François Chaussier. Because of professional jealousy of her colleague and friend Mme Lachapelle, Mme Boivin resigned her position in 1811. She accepted a position for servants' wages at a Paris hospital for fallen women. In the subsequent years she served as co-director or director at a number of hospitals, including the General Hospital for Seine-et-Oise (1814), a temporary military hospital (1815), the Hospice de la Maternité, and the Maison Royale de Santé. She was also member of several medical societies. She has published articles and books about her own case and her uterine speculum. Her Mémorial de l'art des accouchements (1817) went through several editions and became a standard textbook. She rejected the offer of Mme Lachapelle's position after the latter died in 1822.

== Contribution ==
Mme Boivin invented a new pelvimeter, and a vaginal speculum which was used to dilate the vagina in order to examine the cervix. Her invention helped not only her female patients, but also medical practitioners. She is one of the first to use stethoscopes to listen to the fetal heart. She was given credit for discovering the cause of certain types of bleeding, the cause of miscarriages and diseases of the placenta and uterus. Radcliffe stated that Mme Boivin "was undertaking surgical treatments which in other countries were the prerogative of the men". Mme Boivin was also one of the first surgeons to amputate the cervix uteri for a cancerous growth. Because Mme Boivin was an innovative and skillful gynecological surgeon, German universities became more open to the idea of women becoming skilled in gynecological surgery.

From 1812 to 1823, Mme Boivin had many publications, both original and translations. Her first edition of Memorial de l'Art des Accouchemens was published in 1812. It included notes she had taken from Marie-Louise Lachapelle's teaching, and the book was used as a handbook for medical students and midwives. The third edition of Memorial de l'Art des Accouchemens was translated into several European languages. Her work of the causes of miscarriages received a commendation from the Royal Society of Medicine at Bordeaux. She also has published articles about her own cases and her uterine speculum in the bulletins of the faculty of medicin and of the Amcademie royale de medecine de Paris. Mme Boivin then focused on more advanced writings in gynecology, such as Nouveau Traité des Hemorragies de l'Uterus and Traité de Maladies de l'Uterus et des Annexes, which was her most important work. It included 41 plates and 116 figures which she colored herself, and superseded the textbook which had been in use for 150 years.

=== Selected work ===
- Memorial de l'Art des Accouchmens (handbook for medical student and midwives), 1812
- Nouveau traité des hémorragies de l'utérus (New treatments for bleeding from the uterus), 1818
- Mémorial de l'art des accouchemens (handbook for medical students, third edition), 1824
- Recherches sur une des causes les plus frequentes et la moins connue de l'avortement (the Most Frequent and Least Known Causes of miscarriages), 1828
- Observations et reflexions sur les cas d'absorption de placenta (the case of absorption of the placenta), 1829
- Traité des Maladies de l'utérus et des annexes (Diseases of the uterus), 1833

== Honors ==
- Prussia Golden Medal of Civil Merit, 1814
- Honorary MD degree of the University of Marburg in Germany, 1827
- Commendation from the Royal Society of Medical in Bordeaux
- Member of several medical societies
- A nursery named after Mme Boivin at her home town, Versailles
