= Marie Jonet Dugès =

French head midwife of the Hôtel-Dieu

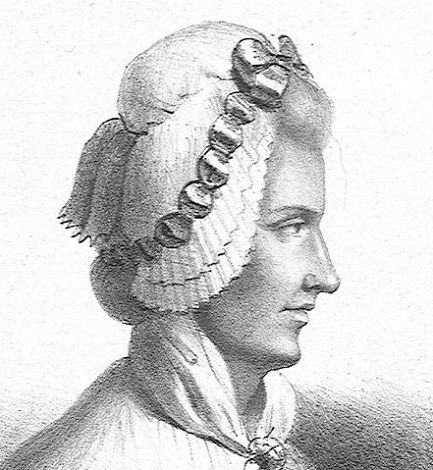
Marie Jonet ("Madame Dugès")

Marie Jonet Dugès (1730–1797) was a French midwife.

== Family ==
Jonet Dugès' daughter, Marie Lachapelle, was also a renowned midwife. From an early age, her daughter was a constant companion and assisted at births. Dugès taught her everything she knew about midwifery.

== Career ==
Jonet Dugès was first a sworn midwife ("sage-femme jurée") at the Chatelet Hospital. Later, in 1775, she was promoted to the position of Midwife-in-Chief of the Hôtel-Dieu. She performed her duties with such zeal, ability, and faithfulness that when she retired the government awarded her a liberal pension.

== Legacy ==
Marie Jonet Dugès is remembered as one of the most significant midwives attached to the Hôtel-Dieu, and for her improvement of French midwifery.
