= Antoine Louis Dugès =

French zoologist (1797–1838)

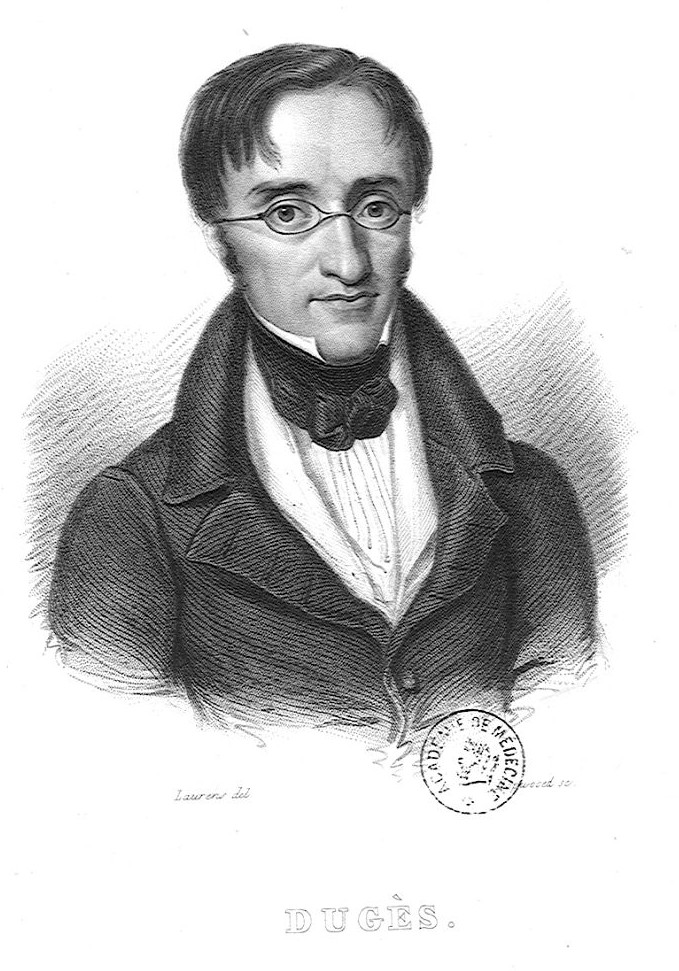
- Born: Antoine Louis Dugès; 19 December 1797; Charleville-Mézières, France
- Died: 1 May 1838 (aged 40); Montpellier, France
- Known for: Dugès, A.
- Scientific career
- Fields: Zoology, obstetrics
- Workplaces: University of Montpellier
- Author abbrev. (zoology): Dugès

Antoine Louis Dugès (19 December 1797 – 1 May 1838) was a French obstetrician and naturalist born in Charleville-Mézières, Ardennes. He was the father of zoologist Alfredo Dugès (1826–1910), and a nephew to midwife Marie-Louise Lachapelle (1769–1821).

== Career ==
Dugès studied medicine in Paris and began work as a prosector in 1820. In 1825 he received his agrégation, shortly afterwards being appointed professor of obstetrics at the University of Montpellier. In 1826, he published Manuel d'obstétrique, a textbook on obstetrics that was published in several editions. He was also responsible for the publication of his aunt's works on obstetrics.

As a zoologist, Dugès conducted osteological and myological studies of amphibians. He also performed extensive research of acarids (mites). In 1838, he published an influential work on comparative physiology, titled Traité de physiologie comparée.

He was a member of several learned societies, including the Académie de Médecine and the Académie des sciences de Paris. He died in Montpellier on 1 May 1838, at the age of 40.

== Eponyms ==
Antoine Louis Dugès is commemorated in the scientific name of a species of lizard, Lacerta dugesii.

The genus of freshwater planarians Dugesia is named after him.

== Selected publications ==
- Essai sur la nature de la fièvre, 1823
- Manuel d'obstétrique, 1826
- Discours sur les causes et le traitement des difformités du rachis, 1827
- Recherches sur l'organisation et les mœurs des Planariées, 1828
- Mémoire sur la conformité organique dans l'échelle animale, 1832
- Recherches sur l'ostéologie et la myologie des batraciens à leurs différens âges, 1834
- Recherches sur l'ordre des Acariens en général et la famille des Trombidées en particulier, 1834
- Traité de physiologie comparée, 1838

== Source ==
- This article is based on a translation of an equivalent article at the French Wikipedia, reference listed as: Dictionnaire encyclopédique des sciences médicales: vol. 64, 1884, p. 642
