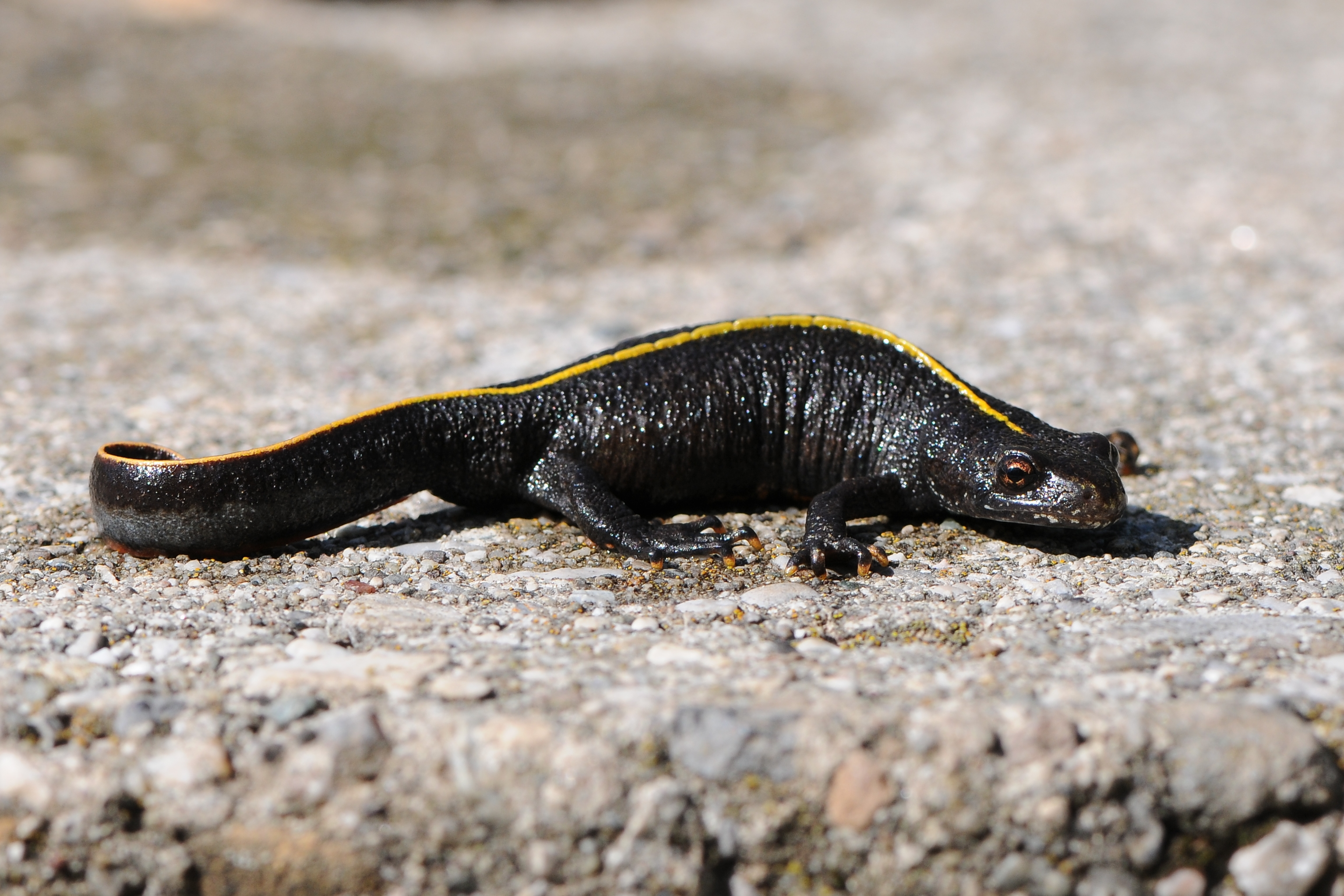
- Juvenile with yellow dorsal stripe

Conservation status
- Vulnerable (IUCN 3.1)

Scientific classification
- Kingdom: Animalia
- Phylum: Chordata
- Class: Amphibia
- Order: Urodela
- Family: Salamandridae
- Genus: Triturus
- Species: T. carnifex

Binomial name
- Triturus carnifex (Laurenti, 1768)
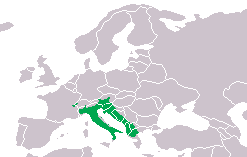
- Range of T. carnifex in Europe

= Italian crested newt =

Species of amphibian

The Italian crested newt (Triturus carnifex) is a species of newt in the family Salamandridae.

== Habitat ==
Triturus carnifex is found in parts of the Balkans and Italy. It is an aquatic breeder that can spend up to four months in the water. The location of the ponds where they breed affects the time when T. carnifex enters the water. T. carnifex prefers living in deep water since it is a nektonic species: it swims freely and is independent of currents. The absence of predatory fish may also explain why T. carnifex is inclined to ponds, rather than other larger bodies of water.

They typically prefer ponds in northern Europe, where temperatures are colder. Adult T. carnifex start to arrive between February and May, and leave between July and October. In warmer ponds, adult newts arrive within a month and leave during a two-week period in July. Andreone and Giacoma (1989) speculated that newt migration into the ponds increases after rainy days, since after rainfall, newt activity is not limited by humidity.

Higher altitudes, where temperatures begin to decrease, have a direct effect on the size of T. carnifex. Ficetola et al. (2010) discovered that living in colder temperatures resulted a body size increase in both male and female. Females in higher altitudes were found to be larger because they were carrying more oocytes and larger ovaries, which gave them a reproductive advantage over the smaller females. T. carnifex is poikilothermic and larger body sizes help to reduce heat fluctuations. Ficetola also found that fluctuations in body temperature of T. carnifex decreased when body size increased. An increase in body size also occurs where there is increased precipitation or nearby primary producers, due to the effect of increased resources on animals.

Human interference has dramatically changed the habitat of T. carnifex due to the expansion of industrial areas and urban centers. This results in a fragmentation of natural landscapes, which leads to selective extinction, genetic drift, and inbreeding from isolation. Introducing fish to isolated wetland habitats also leads to a decline of amphibians because of predation on newt larvae.

== Physiology ==
Adult newts in the genus Triturus were found to breathe mainly via the skin but also through the lungs and the buccal cavity. Lung breathing is mainly used when there is a lack of oxygen in the water, or at high activity such as during courtship, breeding, or feeding.

When T. carnifex newts are induced into anemia, they are able to respire without the need of blood cells. Around two weeks after anemia is induced, the newts produces a mass of cells that helps to revitalize the already circulating red blood cell mass.

During winter months, prolactin is released into the circulatory system, which drives T. carnifex into the aquatic environment and reduces the active transport of sodium ions. This happens because there is more water readily available to the newt for uptake as compared to its terrestrial dwelling during the summer months. In the aquatic phase, T. carnifex has a reduced urine flow and glomerular filtration rate compared to the terrestrial phase. In summer, aldosterone creates an increase in enzymatic activity in T. carnifex, which leads to a decrease in ion transport.

== Behaviour and ecology ==
To avoid competition with other co-occurring newts, T. carnifex tends to reproduce in the deeper parts of a pond and is more nocturnal. Due to their larger size, they can prey on smaller species such as the palmate newt.

Reproductive females of T. carnifex were shown to regulate their body temperature more precisely and prefer higher temperatures than non-reproductive females and males.

== Sensitivity to pollutants ==
Cadmium, a released into the environment from industrial and consumer waste, has been shown to be detrimental to T. carnifex even at a concentrations below Italian and European thresholds, by disrupting the activity of the adrenal gland. In experiments allowing Italian crested newts to be exposed to nonylphenol, an endocrine disruptor common in leakage from sewers, there was a decrease in corticosterone and aldosterone, hormones produced by the adrenal gland and important for stress response.
