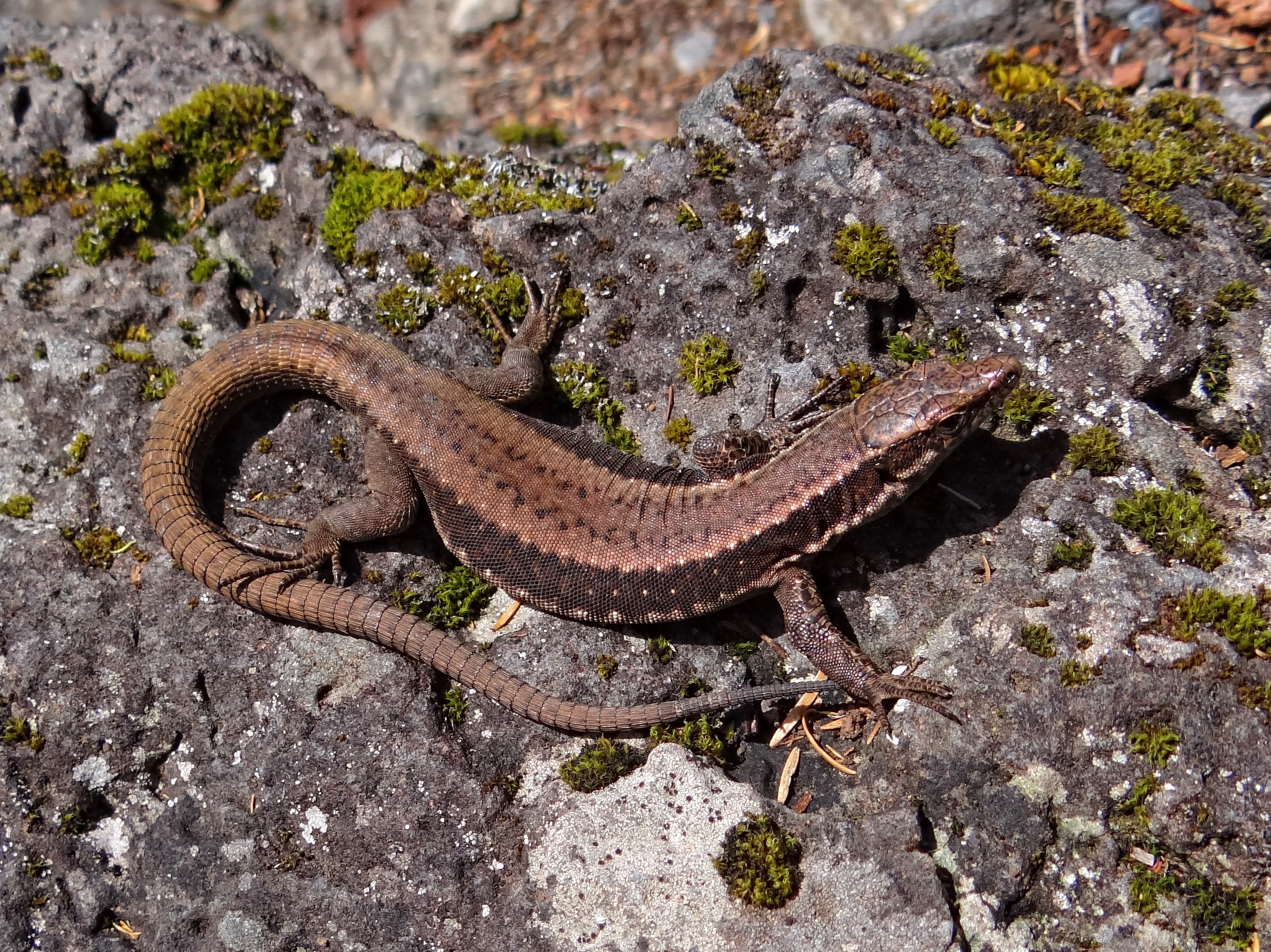

Conservation status
- Least Concern (IUCN 3.1)

Scientific classification
- Kingdom: Animalia
- Phylum: Chordata
- Class: Reptilia
- Order: Squamata
- Family: Lacertidae
- Genus: Teira; Gray, 1838
- Species: T. dugesii

Binomial name
- Teira dugesii (Milne-Edwards, 1829)

Synonyms
- Lacerta dugesii Milne-Edwards, 1829; Podarcis dugesii — Engelmann et al., 1993; Teira dugesii — Mayer & Bischoff, 1996

= Madeiran wall lizard =

Species of reptile

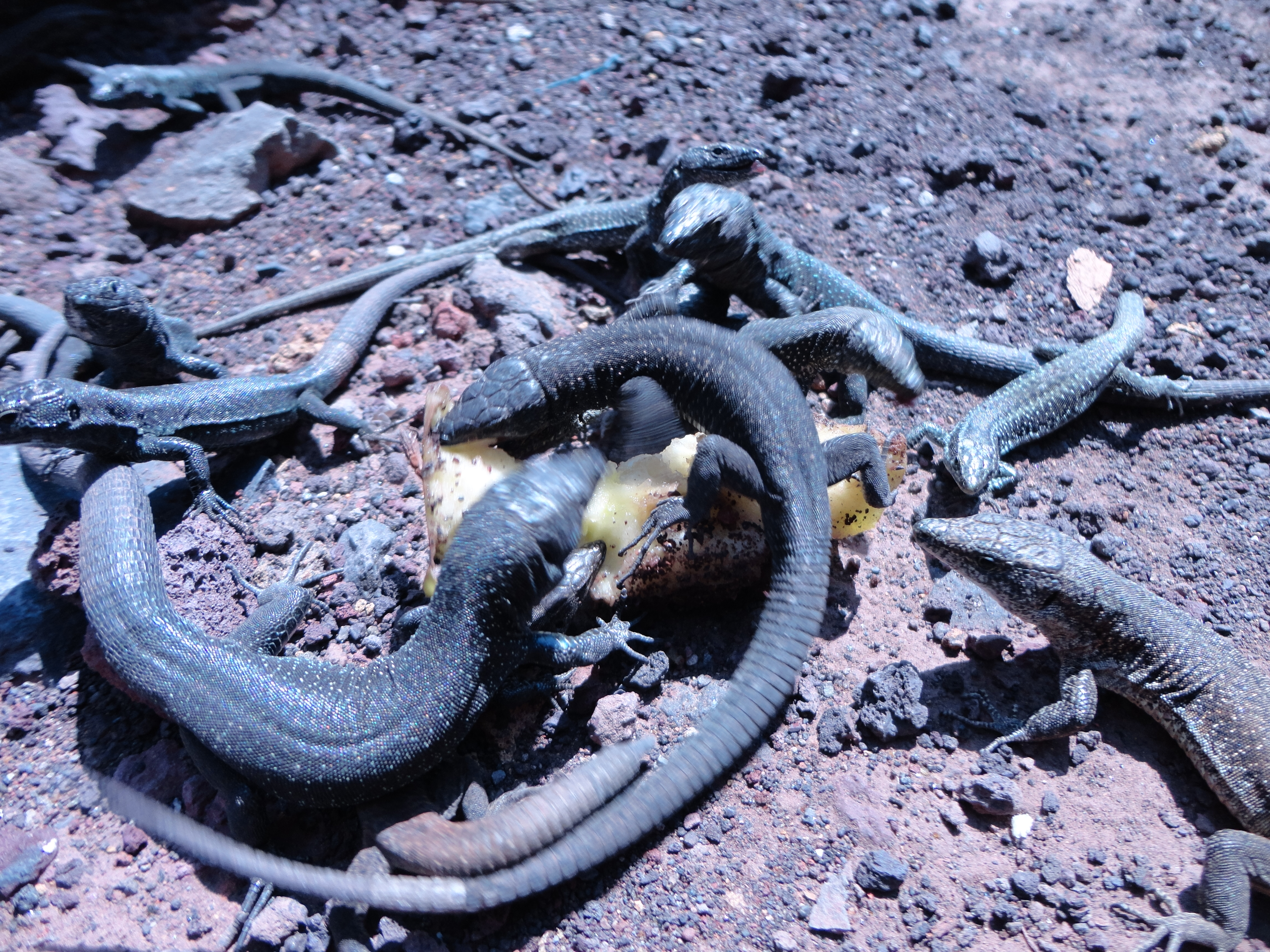
Madeiran wall lizards fighting for food in the Desertas Islands

The Madeiran wall lizard (Teira dugesii), being the only species in the genus Teira, is a species of lizard in the family Lacertidae with four recognized subspecies. The species is endemic to the Madeira Archipelago, Portugal. In the Azores, this lizard has become naturalized after an involuntary introduction by the shipping trade between the two archipelagos. The species is both endemic and common, ranging from sea coasts to altitudes of 1,850 metres (6,070 ft).

== Etymology ==
The specific name, dugesii, is in honor of French physician and naturalist Antoine Louis Dugès.

== Habitat ==
The Madeiran wall lizard's natural habitats are temperate forests and shrublands, Mediterranean-type shrubby vegetation, rocky areas, rocky shores, sandy shores, arable land, pastureland, plantations, rural gardens, and urban areas.

== Subspecies ==
The following four subspecies are recognized as being valid, including the nominotypical subspecies.

- Teira dugesii dugesii (Milne-Edwards, 1829), found on the main Madeira island.
- Teira dugesii jogeri (Bischoff, Osenegg & Mayer, 1989); named after German herpetologist Ulrich Joger, found on Porto Santo and surrounding islands
- Teira dugesii mauli (Mertens, 1938), found on Deserta Grande island.
- Teira dugesii selvagensis (Bischoff, Osenegg & Mayer, 1989); , found on Selvagem Grande island, Selvagens Islands

Nota bene: A trinomial authority in parentheses indicates that the subspecies was originally described in a genus other than Teira.

== Description ==
The Madeiran wall lizard grows to a snout-to-vent length (SVL) of about 8 cm (3.1 in) with a tail about 1.7 times the length of its body. Females lay two to three clutches of eggs in a year with the juveniles being about 3 cm (1.2 in) when they hatch. Its colouring is variable and tends to match the surroundings, typically a shade of brown or grey with occasionally a greenish tinge. Most Madeiran wall lizards are finely flecked with darker markings and their underparts white or cream, sometimes with dark spots, with some males having orange or red underparts and blue throats. These bright colours may fade if the animal is disturbed. On the island of Madeira, individuals from shingle beaches have been found to be morphologically divergent from adjacent inland individuals from vegetated habitats despite high levels of gene flow. In addition, several genomic loci that appear to be on chromosome 3 appear to show polymorphisms linked to these habitat differences.

== Behaviour ==
The Madeiran wall lizard is very common on the island of Madeira where it is the only small lizard, ranging from sea coasts to altitudes of 1,850 metres (6,070 ft). It is usually found in rocky places or among scrub and may climb into trees, and also found in gardens and on the walls of buildings. The tail is easily shed and the stump regenerates slowly.

== Diet ==
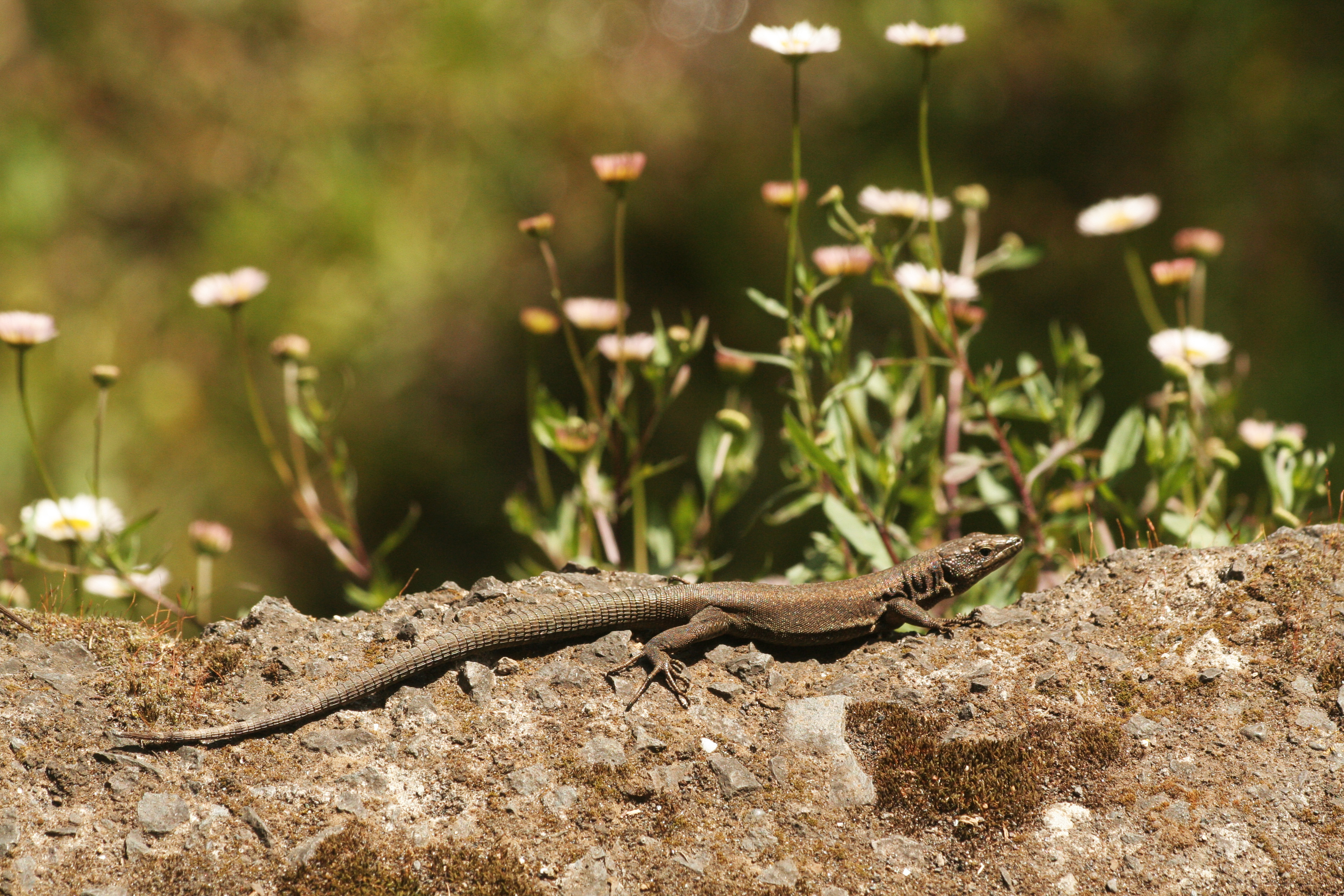
Madeiran wall lizard (Teira dugesii) captured in Levada do Norte, Madeira

The Madeiran wall lizard feeds on small invertebrates such as ants and also eats some vegetable matter such as bananas.

== Reproduction ==
Adult females of T. dugesii lay two to three clutches of eggs in a year with the juveniles being about 3 cm (1.2 in) when they hatch.

== Ecoepidemiology ==
T. dugesii is one of many species that may be parasitized by ticks and can act as a secondary or alternative reservoir for Lyme disease or other tick-borne zoonoses. Large warm-blooded mammals like deer and boar seem to have become the first epidemiologic reservoir (and/or host) for European ticks.
