= Jean-Louis Baudelocque =

French obstetrician

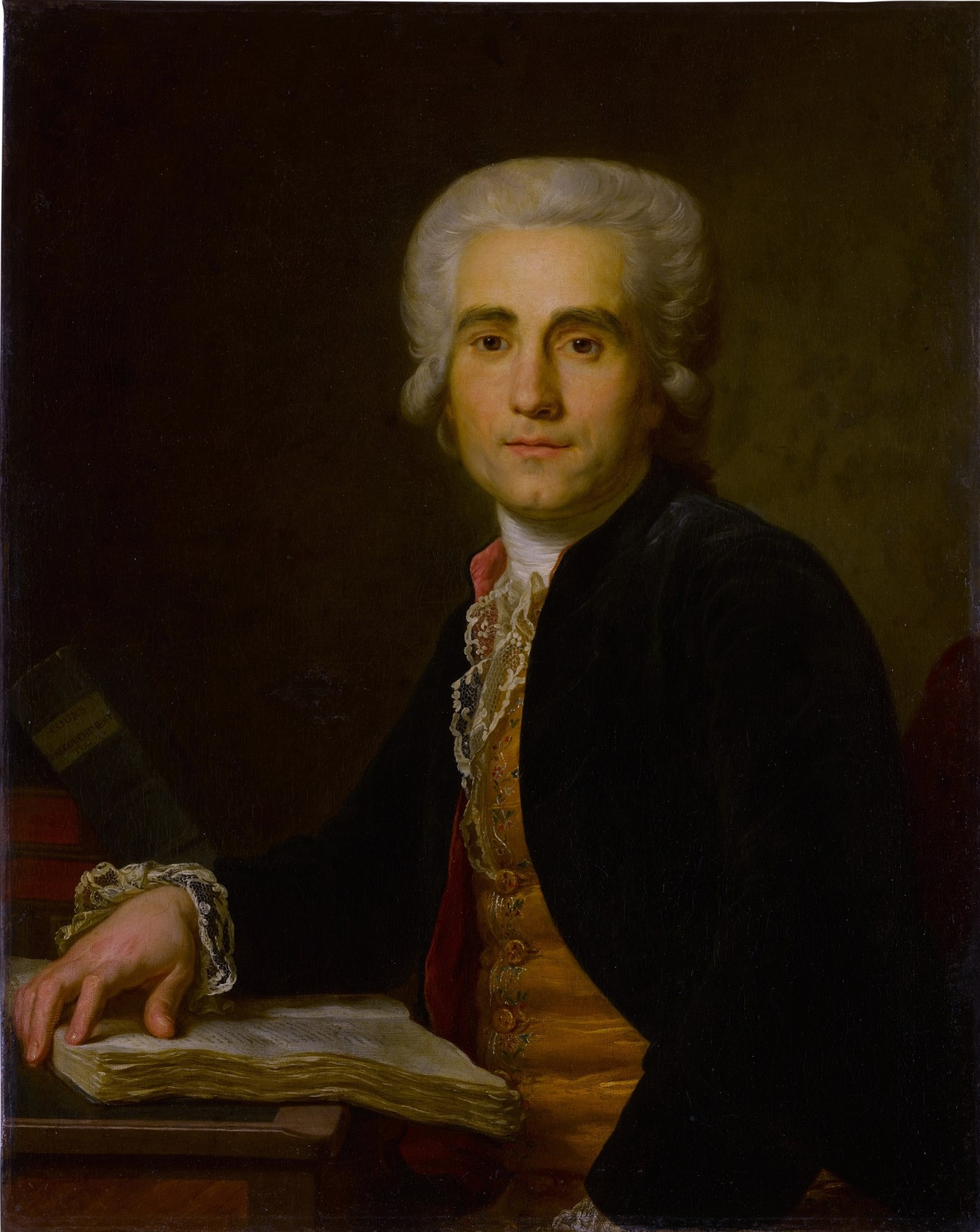
Portrait of Jean-Louis Baudelocque by Antoine Vestier, circa 1785

Jean-Louis Baudelocque (30 November 1745 – 2 May 1810) was a French obstetrician who studied and practiced medicine in Paris. He was born in Heilly, in the French province of Picardy.

Baudelocque is known for making obstetrics a scientific discipline in France. He advanced and popularized the methodology of William Smellie (1697–1763), who modernized obstetrical practices in England in the 18th century. Baudelocque is credited for correcting errors regarding childbirth and wrote a popular book on midwifery. He refined André Levret's (1703–1780) "pelvic forceps" and constructed a pelvimeter for use in obstetrics. His pelvimeter were anthropometric calipers used to measure external pelvic dimensions. This distance was to become known as "Baudelocque's diameter" (the external conjugate diameter of the pelvis). In England, William Smellie developed a method for measuring internal pelvic dimensions.

In 1806, Emperor Napoleon appointed Baudelocque as the first chair of obstetrics in France, and at the same time he began serving as physician-in-chief at the Maternité (later named Maternité Baudelocque), where he taught classes on midwifery. Napoleon also chose him as accoucheur to Empress Marie-Louise and to Caroline Bonaparte, the emperor's younger sister.

Simple pelvimeter

== Selected writings ==
- Principes sur l'art des accouchemens, 1775; deuxième édition. chez Méquignon l'aîné, libraire ... 1787.
- l'Art des accouchemens, 1781; tome premier, deuxième édition. chez Méquignon l'aîné, libraire ... 1789. tome second, deuxième edition. chez Méquignon l'aîné, libraire ... 1789.
