= List of reptiles of Cape Verde =

The reptiles of Cape Verde comprise 24 terrestrial species, along with six species of sea turtles found along its coasts and beaches. The Cape Verde giant skink became extinct at the beginning of the 20th century. Several of the archipelago’s endemic species also have subspecies unique to each island. Finally, among the introduced species, there is debate over whether the one that is established is the tropical house gecko or the merchant gecko.

== Squamata ==
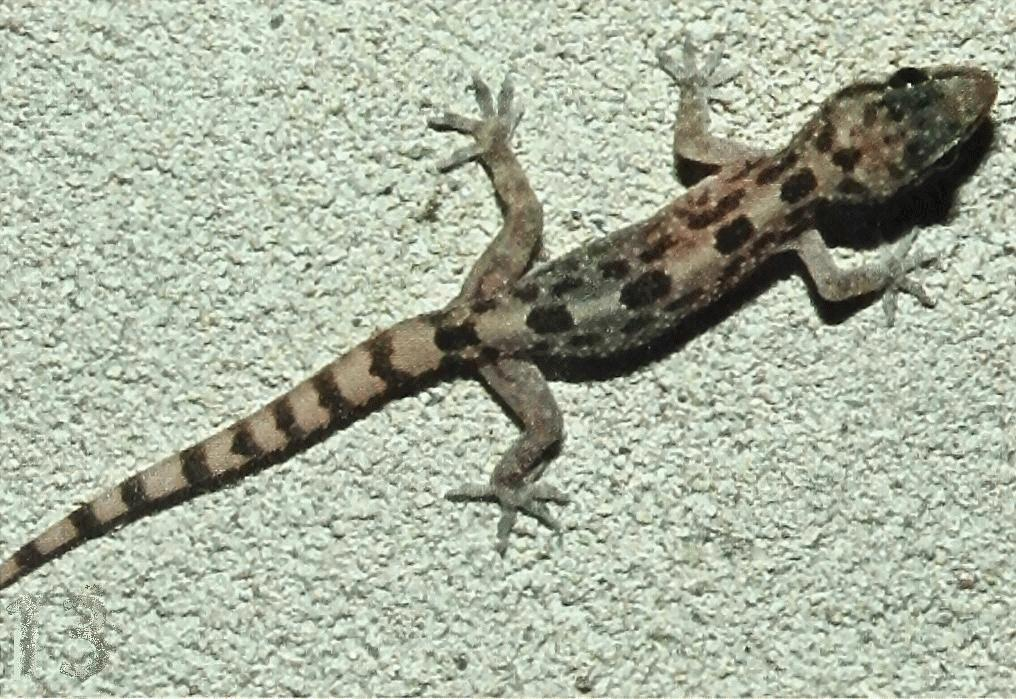
The African common leaf-toed gecko, an introduced species.

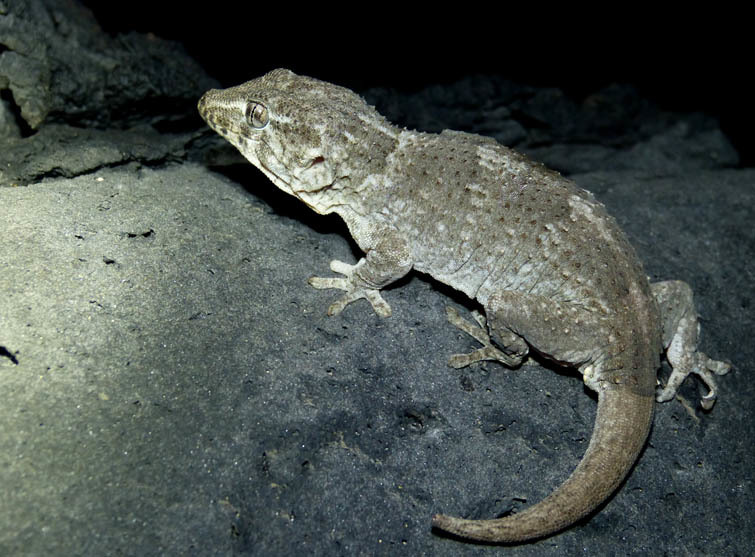
Giant wall gecko, an endemic species at risk of extinction that exhibits insular gigantism.

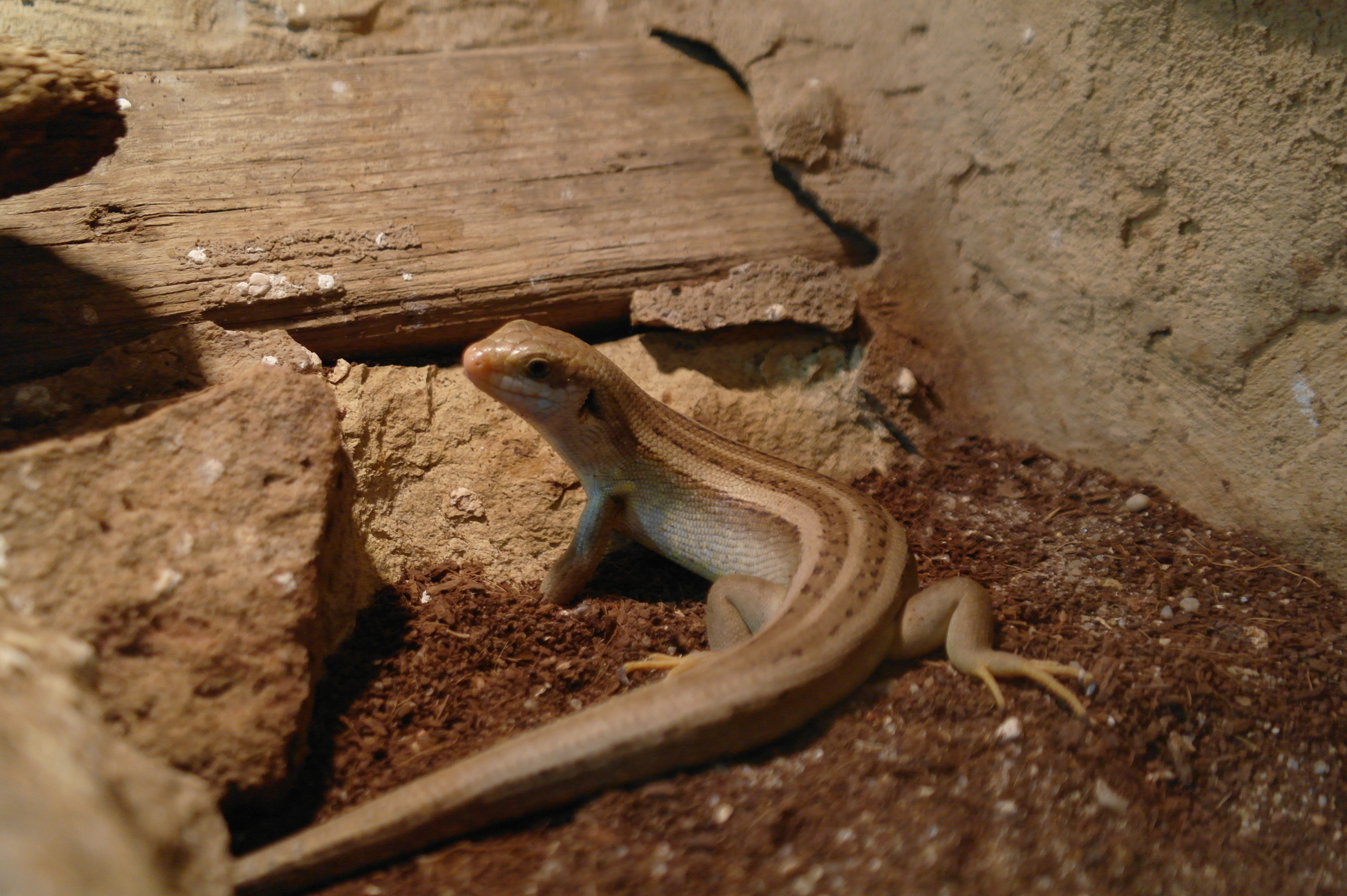
The Vaillant's skink, one of the many endemic species of skinks.

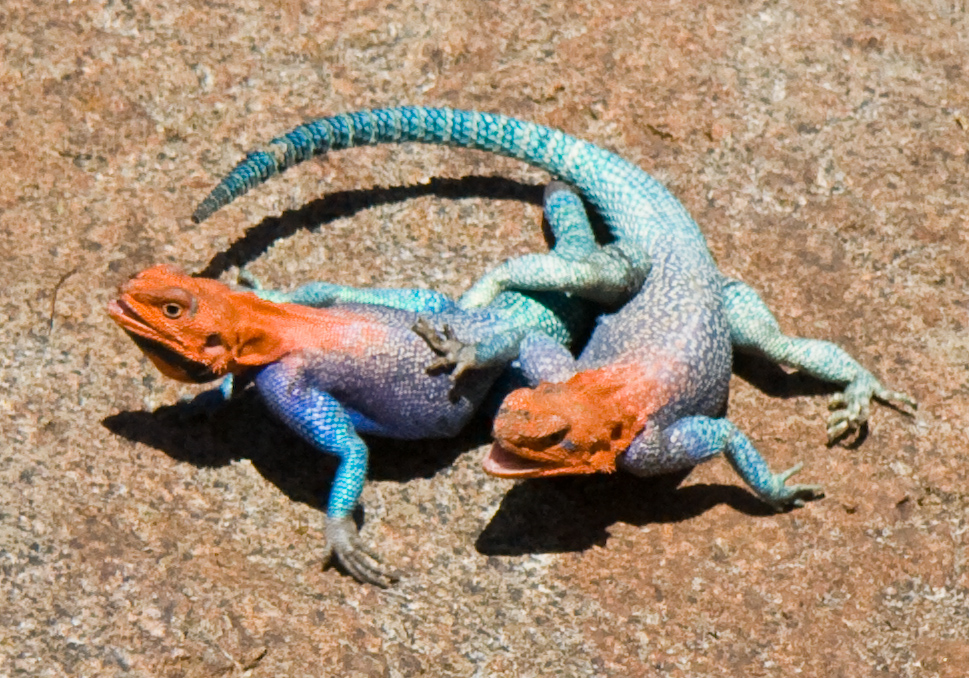
The Common agama, a species originating from mainland Africa.

=== Gekkonidae ===
- Cape Verde leaf-toed gecko (Hemidactylus bouvieri) CR
  - Hemidactylus bouvieri bouvieri
  - Hemidactylus bouvieri razoensis
- Boa Vista leaf-toed gecko (Hemidactylus boavistensis) NT
- Fogo leaf-toed gecko (Hemidactylus lopezjuradoi) DD
- African common leaf-toed gecko (Hemidactylus angulatus) LC
- Merchant gecko (Hemidactylus mercatorius) LC

=== Phyllodactylidae ===
- Boa Vista wall gecko (Tarentola boavistensis) VU
- Bocage's wall gecko (Tarentola bocagei) LC
- Fogo wall gecko (Tarentola fogoensis) LC
- Darwin's wall gecko (Tarentola darwini) LC
- São Vicente wall gecko (Tarentola substituta) LC
- Raso wall gecko (Tarentola raziana) NT
- Santo Antão wall gecko (Tarentola caboverdiana) LC
- São Nicolau wall gecko (Tarentola nicolauensis) LC
- Giant wall gecko (Tarentola gigas) EN
  - Tarentola gigas gigas
  - Tarentola gigas brancoensis
- Rough wall gecko (Tarentola rudis) DD
- large wall gecko (Tarentola protogigas) LC
  - Tarentola protogigas protogigas
  - Tarentola protogigas hartogi
- Maio wall gecko (Tarentola maioensis) LC

=== Scincidae ===
- Vaillant's skink (Chioninia vaillantii) EN
  - Chioninia vaillantii vaillantii
  - Chioninia vaillantii xanthotis
- Delalande's skink (Chioninia delalandii) LC
- São Nicolau skink (Chioninia nicolauensis) LC
- Santo Antão skink (Chioninia fogoensis) LC
- Stanger's skink (Chioninia stangeri) NT
- Cape Verde giant skink (Chioninia coctei) EX
- Spiny skink (Chioninia spinalis) LC
  - Chioninia spinalis salensis
  - Chioninia spinalis santiagoensis
  - Chioninia spinalis spinalis
  - Chioninia spinalis maioensis
  - Chioninia spinalis boavistensis

=== Agamidae ===
- Common agama (Agama agama) LC

== Testudines ==
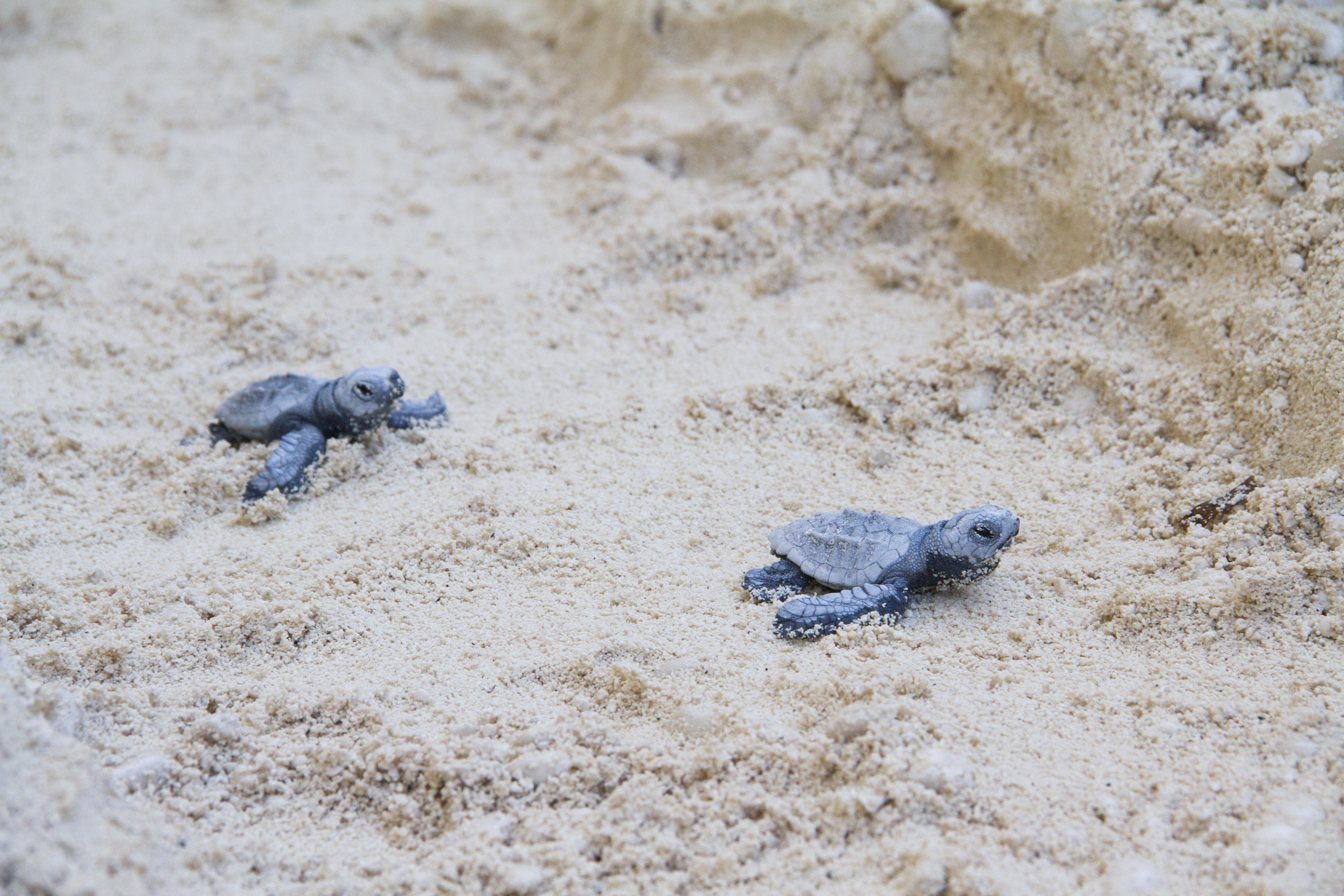
Cape Verde is among the 3 most important places in the world for the nesting of sea turtles, especially the loggerhead sea turtle.

=== Dermochelyidae ===
- Leatherback sea turtle (Dermochelys coriacea) VU

=== Cheloniidae ===
- Loggerhead sea turtle (Caretta caretta) VU
- Green sea turtle (Chelonia mydas) LC
- Hawksbill sea turtle (Eretmochelys imbricata) CR
- Kemp's ridley sea turtle (Lepidochelys kempii) CR
- Olive ridley sea turtle (Lepidochelys olivacea) VU

== See also ==
- List of mammals of Cape Verde
- List of birds of Cape Verde
- List of amphibians of Cape Verde
- List of reptiles of the Atlantic Ocean
- List of reptiles of the Azores
- List of reptiles of Madeira
- List of reptiles of the Canary Islands
- Centrochelys atlantica
