= Pierre Delalande =

Pierre Delalande may refer to:

- Pierre Delalande (engineer), French military engineer
- Pierre Antoine Delalande (1787–1823), French naturalist and explorer
