= Mle 1951 AP blast mine =

French anti-personnel blast mine

The Mle 1951 (Model 1951) or MI AP ID 51 is a small circular French brown plastic cased minimum metal mine anti-personnel blast mine. The mine uses a pressure fuze that works by driving a firing pin through a friction sensitive compound (a mixture of Red Phosphorus and glass). The mines safety is a small cap that sits over the pressure fuze and prevents it being pressed. The mine can be used with anti-handling devices.

The mine was in service with the French Army and was used in Algeria. It was superseded by the Mle 1955 mine (MI AP DV 59)

== Specifications ==
- Height: 52 mm
- Diameter: 70 mm
- Weight: 85 g
- Explosive content: 45 g of Tolite and 15 g of Tetryl
- Operating pressure: 5 kg
