= MC-71 mine =

Anti-tank mine

The MC-71 is a Romanian tilt-rod fuzed anti-tank landmine. The mine's body consists of two truncated cones, the lower of the cones contains the main charge and fuzing mechanism. The main charge is a large shaped charge, which triggers 200 ms to 400 ms after the tilt rod is activated. The tilt rod can be deployed away from the mine, potentially making it effective against clearance vehicles using mine rollers and mine flails.

== History ==
The MC-71 is very similar to the obsolete French Modèle 1951 mine. The mine may violate the Ottawa Treaty.

== Technical ==
The MC-71 is a large egg-shaped antitank mine that uses a shaped charge that consists of two truncated cones, that are placed back to back. The shaped charge uses a copper liner, and the body is metallic, making the MC-71 readily detectable by a metal detector. The lower cone contains the explosive shaped-charge and the detonator. The upper assembly functions as a cover intended only to allow better formation of the charge jet. The mine is initiated by a tiltrod assembly which is driven into the ground near the mine. Firing is through a detonating cable connecting the base of the tiltrod assembly to the detonator.

== Specifications ==
- Diameter: 260 millimetres (10 in)
- Weight: 8.8 kilograms (19 lb)
- Height: 300 millimetres (12 in)
- Explosive content: 5.1 kilograms (11 lb)
- Range: 400 metres (1,300 ft)

== Operators ==
Romania: Unknown quantity.
