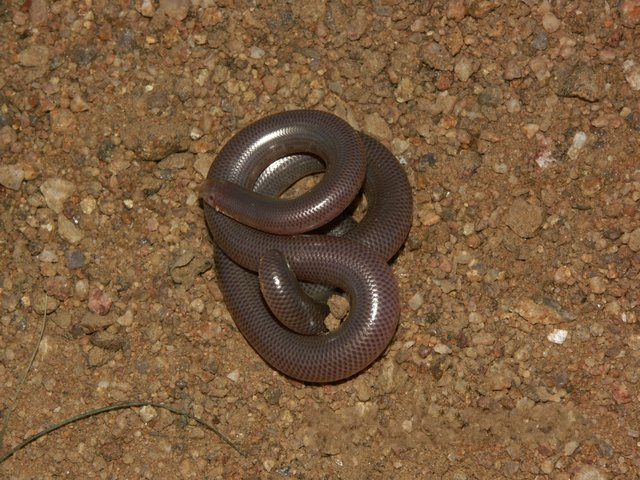
- Rhinotyphlops lalandei

Scientific classification
- Kingdom: Animalia
- Phylum: Chordata
- Class: Reptilia
- Order: Squamata
- Suborder: Serpentes
- Family: Typhlopidae
- Subfamily: Afrotyphlopinae
- Genus: Rhinotyphlops; Fitzinger, 1843

Synonyms
- Rhinotyphlops Fitzinger, 1843; Onychocephalus A.M.C. Duméril & Bibron, 1844; Onychophis Gray, 1845

= Rhinotyphlops =

Genus of snakes

Rhinotyphlops is a genus of blind snakes in the family Typhlopidae. The genus is found in Africa, the Middle East, and India. Some species formerly assigned to the genus Rhinotyphlops have been moved to the genera Afrotyphlops and Letheobia.

== Species ==
Species	Taxon author	Subsp.*	Common name
R. ataeniatus	(Boulenger, 1912)	0
R. boylei	(FitzSimons, 1932)	0	Boyle's beaked blind snake
R. lalandei^{T}	(Schlegel, 1839)	0	Delalande's beaked blind snake
R. leucocephalus	(Parker, 1930)	0
R. schinzi	(Boettger, 1887)	0	Schinz's beaked blind snake
R. scorteccii	(Gans & Laurent, 1965)	0	Scortecci's blind snake
R. unitaeniatus	(W. Peters, 1878)	0

*) Not including the nominate subspecies.
^{T}) Type species.
