= Rhinotyphlops unitaeniatus =

Scientific classification
- Domain: Eukaryota
- Kingdom: Animalia
- Phylum: Chordata
- Class: Reptilia
- Order: Squamata
- Suborder: Serpentes
- Family: Typhlopidae
- Genus: Rhinotyphlops
- Species: R. unitaeniatus

Binomial name
- Rhinotyphlops unitaeniatus (Peters, 1878)

Synonyms
- Typhlops (Letheobia) unitaeniatus Peters, 1878; Typhlops unitæniatus; Boulenger, 1893; Rhinotyphlops unitaeniatus; Roux-Estève, 1974; Letheobia unitaeniata; Broadley & Wallach, 2007

Species of snake

Rhinotyphlops unitaeniatus, commonly known as the yellow-striped blind snake or the Kenya beaked snake, is a species of snake in the Typhlopidae family. It is endemic to Africa.

== Geographic range ==
It is found in eastern Kenya, Somalia, and northeastern Tanzania.

== Description ==
Dorsum black, with a yellow vertebral stripe, which is three scale rows wide. Venter black. The lips, the ventral surface of the snout, and a stripe on the rostral are all brownish yellow.

Total length 37.5 cm (14 3/4 in).

Scales arranged in 25 rows around the body at midbody, in 27 rows anteriorly.

Snout very prominent, hooked, with a sharp horizontal edge, below which are located the nostrils. Rostral very large, extending posteriorly far beyond the eyes. Nasal extending over the eye, in contact with the small ocular. One preocular and one subocular. Eyes distinguishable. Four upper labials. Diameter of body 62 or 63 times in total length. Tail very short.

== Habitat ==
It prefers Acacia-Commiphora deciduous bushland and thicket, and can be found at elevations from 20 to 1,600 metres (66 to 5,249 ft).
