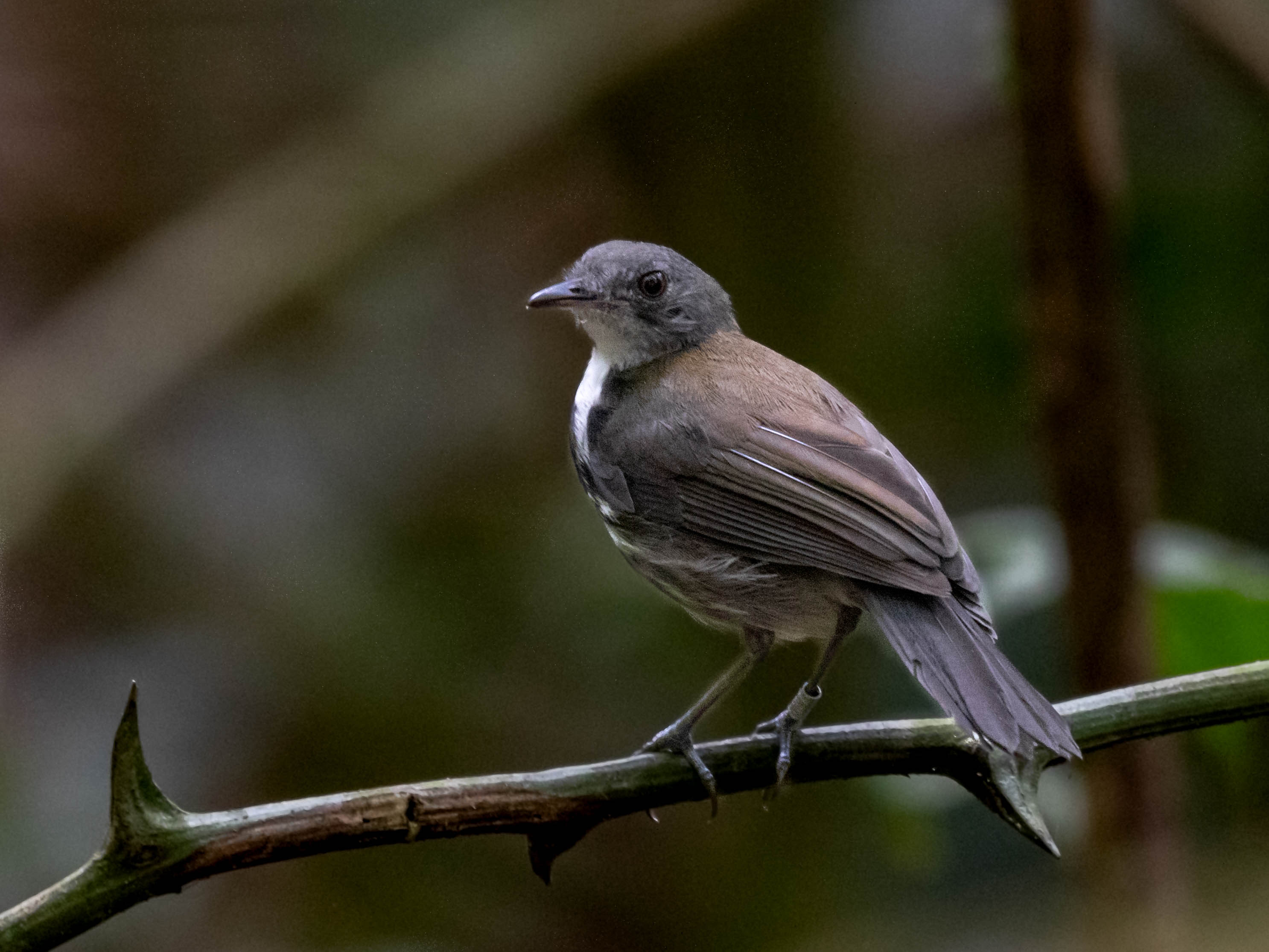

Conservation status
- Least Concern (IUCN 3.1)

Scientific classification
- Kingdom: Animalia
- Phylum: Chordata
- Class: Aves
- Order: Passeriformes
- Family: Tyrannidae
- Genus: Corythopis
- Species: C. torquatus

Binomial name
- Corythopis torquatus Tschudi, 1844

= Ringed antpipit =

Species of bird

The ringed antpipit (Corythopis torquatus) is a species of bird in the family Tyrannidae, the tyrant flycatchers. It is found in every mainland South American country except Argentina, Chile, Paraguay, and Uruguay.

== Taxonomy and systematics ==
The ringed antpipit was originally described as Conopophaga torquata, a member of the gnateater family Conopophagidae. Some authors later suggested that it belonged to family Formicariidae, the antthrushes. A study published in 1968 placed the genus in its current family, but there is still uncertainty about where it belongs. The ringed antpipit shares genus Corythopis with the southern antpipit (C. delalandi). They are treated as a superspecies and have been suggested to be conspecific.

The ringed antpipit has three subspecies, the nominate C. t. torquatus (Tschudi, 1844), C. t. sarayacuensis (Chubb, 1918), and C. t. anthoides (Pucheran, 1855).

== Description ==
The ringed antpipit is 13.5 to 14 cm (5.3 to 5.5 in) long and weighs 15 to 18 g (0.53 to 0.63 oz). The sexes have the same plumage; males are larger than females. Adults of the nominate subspecies have a grayish brown crown, a faint whitish loral spot, and a faint whitish spot behind the eye on an otherwise pale grayish olive face. Their upperparts, wings, and tail are dark brownish olive. Their chin and throat are white. Their underparts are mostly white with an almost solid black "necklace" on the breast that gives the species its English name. Black streaks extend from it along the flanks and its undertail coverts are pale grayish. Juveniles' underside streaks are fewer, paler, and more brownish than adults'. Subspecies C. t. sarayacuensis is smaller than the nominate and its crown is the same dark brownish olive as its back. C. t. anthoides is also smaller than the nominate and has a slate-gray crown. Both sexes of all subspecies have a medium brown, gray-brown, or gray iris, a blackish maxilla, a pale pinkish mandible with a yellow to pinkish orange base, and long pale gray to pinkish gray legs.

== Distribution and habitat ==
The ringed antpipit is primarily a bird of the Amazon Basin and also occurs in the Orinoco Basin. Subspecies C. t. sarayacuensis is the westernmost; it is found in southeastern Colombia, eastern Ecuador, and northeastern Peru. The nominate subspecies is found in east-central and southeastern Peru, northern Bolivia, and western Brazil east to the Madeira River. C. t. anthoides is found in the Orinoco and Amazon basins in southern Venezuela, the Guianas, and Brazil east to the Atlantic in northern Maranhão and south to northern Goiás, northern Mato Grosso, and Rondônia. The species inhabits humid evergreen forest in the tropical zone. There it favors terra firme, seasonally flooded forest, and swamp forest, and less frequently inhabits mid-successional forest along rivers. In elevation it occurs below 600 m (2,000 ft) in Colombia and Ecuador, mostly below 1,000 m (3,300 ft) but locally as high as 1,500 m (4,900 ft) in Peru, and from sea level to 1,400 m (4,600 ft) in Venezuela and Brazil.

== Behavior ==
=== Movement ===
The ringed antpipit is a year-round resident throughout its range.

=== Feeding ===
The ringed antpipit feeds primarily on arthropods and occasionally includes lizards and frogs in its diet. It usually forages alone though sometimes in pairs, never joining mixed-species feeding flocks and only occasionally attending army ant swarms. It walks slowly on the forest floor and along downed logs, bobbing its head and tail. It takes prey mostly by jumping up to take it from the underside of leaves with an audible snap of the bill.

=== Breeding ===
The ringed antpipit's breeding seasons vary geographically but are not fully defined. They include May and June in Venezuela, November and December in eastern Brazil, and span August to December in southeastern Peru. The species' nest is a large oven-shaped dome made of moss with a lining of thin plant fibers and fungal rhizomorphs. It is built on the ground atop leaf litter and has a side entrance. The clutch is two eggs. Fledging occurs about 13 days after hatch. The incubation period and details of parental care are not known.

=== Vocalization ===
The ringed antpipit has somewhat variable songs, which is unusual for a flycatcher. A typical pattern is "a rusty rising-falling (sometimes descending or quavering) whistle followed by a longer descending whistle: HEE'U-huEEU." The song can be preceded, followed, or interrupted by "short pit or rattle notes".

== Status ==
The IUCN has assessed the ringed antpipit as being of Least Concern. It has an extremely large range; its population size is not known and is believed to be decreasing. No immediate threats have been identified. It is considered uncommon to fairly common across its range and occurs in many protected areas both public and private. "Much of this species' habitat remains in relatively pristine condition, and it is not considered likely to become threatened in near future."
