= Rhinotyphlops leucocephalus =

Scientific classification
- Kingdom: Animalia
- Phylum: Chordata
- Class: Reptilia
- Order: Squamata
- Suborder: Serpentes
- Family: Typhlopidae
- Genus: Rhinotyphlops
- Species: R. leucocephalus

Binomial name
- Rhinotyphlops leucocephalus (Parker, 1930)

Synonyms
- Typhlops leucocephalus Parker, 1930; Rhinotyphlops leucocephalus - Roux-Estève, 1974

Species of snake

Rhinotyphlops leucocephalus is a species of snakes in the Typhlopidae family. It is endemic to Africa.
