= List of amphibians of Cape Verde =

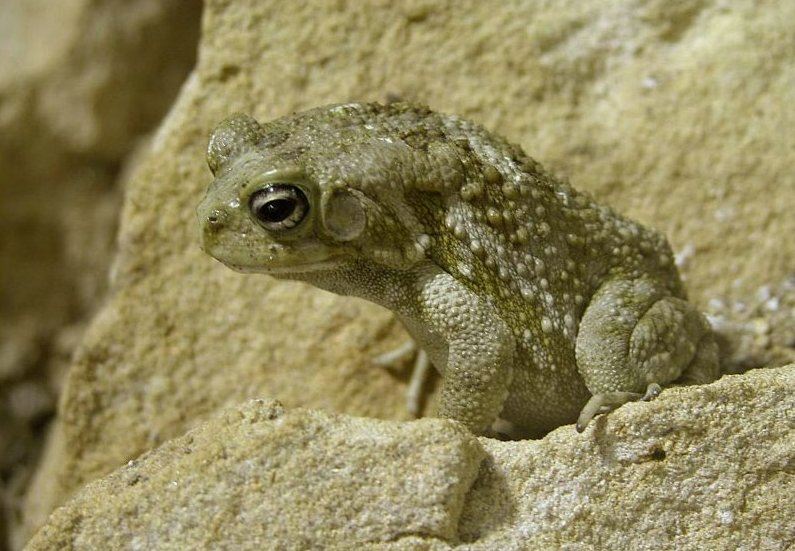
African common toad.

There is a single species of amphibian in the Cape Verde archipelago.

It is believed that the African common toad may have been introduced by humans in historical times.

== Anura ==
=== Bufonidae ===
- African common toad (Sclerophrys regularis) LC

== See also ==
- List of mammals of Cape Verde
- List of birds of Cape Verde
- List of reptiles of Cape Verde
- List of amphibians of the Azores
- List of amphibians of Madeira
- List of amphibians of the Canary Islands
