= Rhinotyphlops scorteccii =

Scientific classification
- Kingdom: Animalia
- Phylum: Chordata
- Class: Reptilia
- Order: Squamata
- Suborder: Serpentes
- Family: Typhlopidae
- Genus: Rhinotyphlops
- Species: R. scorteccii

Binomial name
- Rhinotyphlops scorteccii (Gans & Laurent, 1965)

Synonyms
- Typhlops scorteccii Gans & Laurent, 1965; Rhinotyphlops scorteccii — Roux-Estève, 1974; Letheobia scortecci [sic] — Broadley & Wallach, 2007

Species of snake

Rhinotyphlops scorteccii, commonly known as Scortecci's blind snake, is a species of snake in the family Typhlopidae. The species is endemic to Somalia.

== Etymology ==
The specific name, scorteccii, is in honor of Italian herpetologist Giuseppe Scortecci (1898-1973).

== Reproduction ==
R. scorteccii is oviparous.
