= List of mammals of Cape Verde =

This is a list of the mammal species recorded in Cape Verde. There are thirteen mammal species in Cape Verde, of which one is endangered and two are vulnerable.

The following tags are used to highlight each species' conservation status as assessed by the International Union for Conservation of Nature:

EX	Extinct	No reasonable doubt that the last individual has died.
EW	Extinct in the wild	Known only to survive in captivity or as a naturalized populations well outside its previous range.
CR	Critically endangered	The species is in imminent risk of extinction in the wild.
EN	Endangered	The species is facing an extremely high risk of extinction in the wild.
VU	Vulnerable	The species is facing a high risk of extinction in the wild.
NT	Near threatened	The species does not meet any of the criteria that would categorise it as risking extinction but it is likely to do so in the future.
LC	Least concern	There are no current identifiable risks to the species.
DD	Data deficient	There is inadequate information to make an assessment of the risks to this species.

Some species were assessed using an earlier set of criteria. Species assessed using this system have the following instead of near threatened and least concern categories:

LR/cd	Lower risk/conservation dependent	Species which were the focus of conservation programmes and may have moved into a higher risk category if that programme was discontinued.
LR/nt	Lower risk/near threatened	Species which are close to being classified as vulnerable but are not the subject of conservation programmes.
LR/lc	Lower risk/least concern	Species for which there are no identifiable risks.

== Order: Chiroptera (bats) ==
The bats' most distinguishing feature is that their forelimbs are developed as wings, making them the only mammals capable of flight. Bat species account for about 20% of all mammals.

- Family: Vespertilionidae
  - Subfamily: Vespertilioninae
    - Genus: Hypsugo
      - Savi's pipistrelle, Hypsugo savii LR/lc
    - Genus: Pipistrellus
      - Kuhl's pipistrelle, Pipistrellus kuhlii LC
    - Genus: Plecotus
      - Grey long-eared bat, Plecotus austriacus LR/lc

== Order: Cetacea (whales) ==
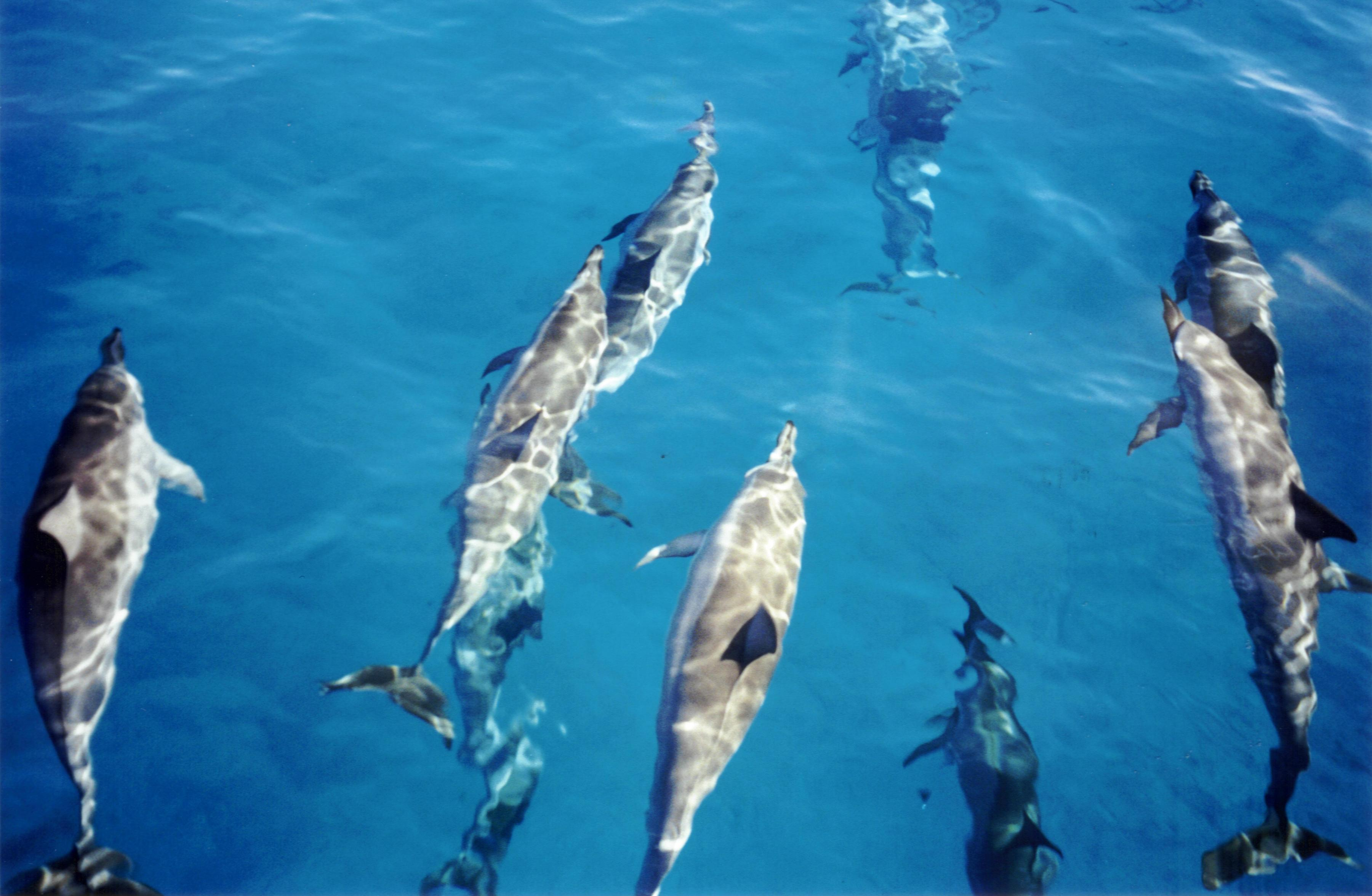
Spinner dolphin

The order Cetacea includes whales, dolphins and porpoises. They are the mammals most fully adapted to aquatic life with a spindle-shaped nearly hairless body, protected by a thick layer of blubber, and forelimbs and tail modified to provide propulsion underwater.

- Suborder: Mysticeti
  - Family: Balaenopteridae
    - Subfamily: Balaenopterinae
      - Genus: Balaenoptera
        - Common minke whale, Balaenoptera acutorostrata VU
        - Sei whale, Balaenoptera borealis EN
        - Bryde's whale, Balaenoptera brydei EN
        - Blue whale, Balaenoptera musculus EN
        - Fin whale, Balaenoptera physalus EN
    - Subfamily: Megapterinae
      - Genus: Megaptera
        - Humpback whale, Megaptera novaeangliae VU
- Suborder: Odontoceti
  - Superfamily: Platanistoidea
    - Family: Phocoenidae
      - Genus: Phocoena
        - Harbour porpoise, Phocoena phocoena VU
  - Family: Physeteridae
    - Genus: Physeter
      - Sperm whale, Physeter macrocephalus VU
  - Family: Kogiidae
    - Genus: Kogia
      - Pygmy sperm whale, Kogia breviceps DD
      - Dwarf sperm whale, Kogia sima DD
  - Family: Ziphidae
    - Genus: Mesoplodon
      - Blainville's beaked whale, Mesoplodon densirostris DD
      - Gervais' beaked whale, Mesoplodon europaeus DD
    - Genus: Ziphius
      - Cuvier's beaked whale, Ziphius cavirostris DD
  - Family: Delphinidae (marine dolphins)
    - Genus: Orcinus
      - Killer whale, Orcinus orca DD
    - Genus: Feresa
      - Pygmy killer whale, Feresa attenuata DD
    - Genus: Pseudorca
      - False killer whale, Pseudorca crassidens DD
    - Genus: Delphinus
      - Short-beaked common dolphin, Delphinus delphis LR/cd
    - Genus: Lagenodelphis
      - Fraser's dolphin, Lagenodelphis hosei DD
    - Genus: Stenella
      - Pantropical spotted dolphin, Stenella attenuata LR/cd
      - Clymene dolphin, Stenella clymene DD
      - Striped dolphin, Stenella coeruleoalba DD
      - Atlantic spotted dolphin, Stenella frontalis DD
      - Spinner dolphin, Stenella longirostris LR/cd
    - Genus: Steno
      - Rough-toothed dolphin, Steno bredanensis DD
    - Genus: Tursiops
      - Common bottlenose dolphin, Tursiops truncatus LC
    - Genus: Globicephala
      - Short-finned pilot whale, Globicephala macrorhynchus DD
    - Genus: Grampus
      - Risso's dolphin, Grampus griseus DD
    - Genus: Peponocephala
      - Melon-headed whale, Peponocephala electra DD

== Order: Carnivora (carnivorans) ==
There are over 260 species of carnivorans, the majority of which eat meat as their primary dietary item. They have a characteristic skull shape and dentition.

- Suborder: Caniformia
  - Family: Phocidae (earless seals)
    - Genus: Monachus
      - Mediterranean monk seal, M. monachus EN possibly extirpated
- Suborder: Feliformia
  - Family: Herpestidae (mongooses)
      - Common slender mongoose, Herpestes sanguineus LC introduced

== Order: Primates ==
The order Primates contains humans and their closest relatives: lemurs, lorisoids, tarsiers, monkeys, and apes

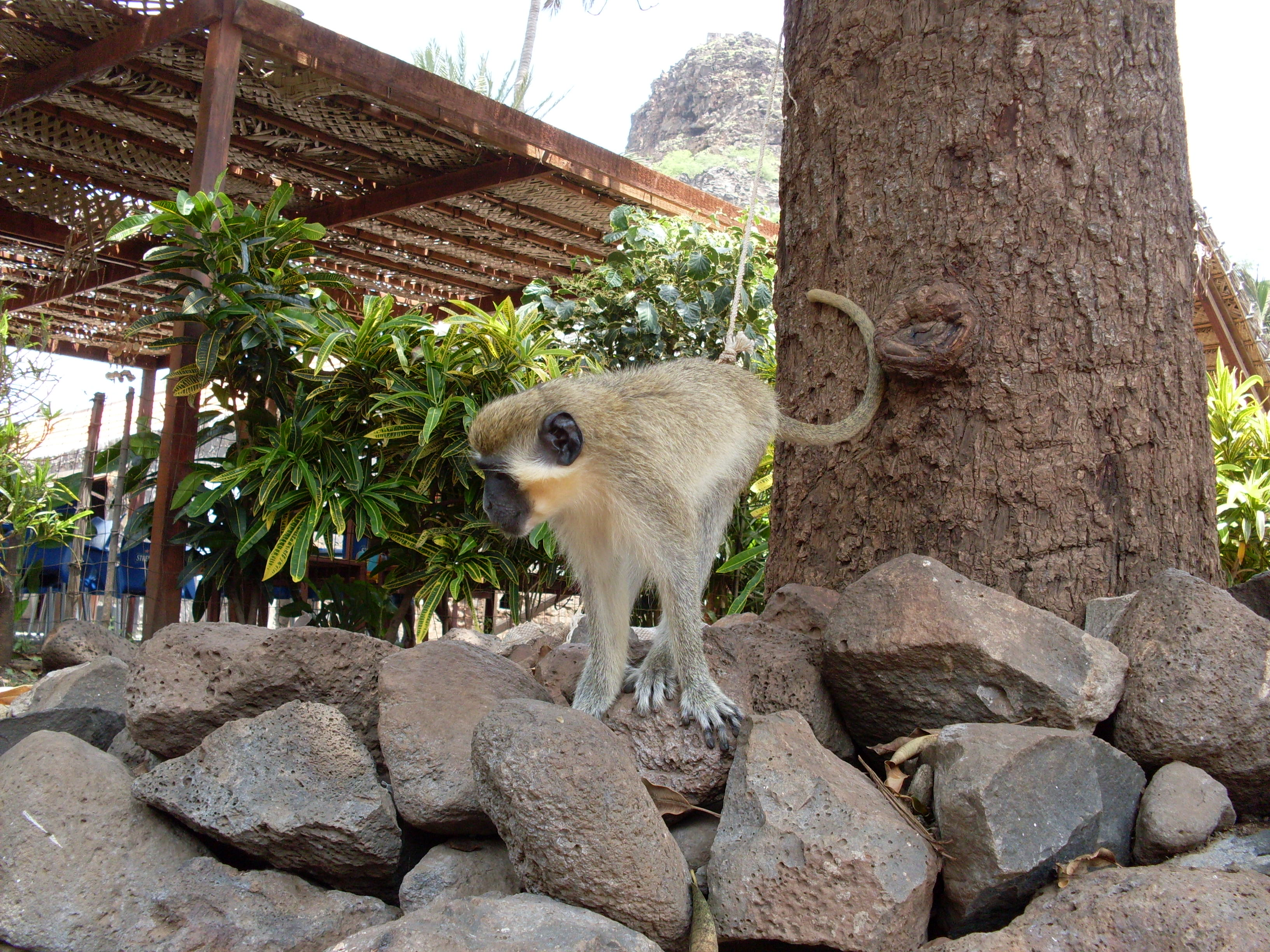
Green monkey in Cidade Velha

- Suborder: Haplorhini
  - Infraorder: Simiiformes
    - Parvorder: Catarrhini
      - Superfamily: Cercopithecoidea
        - Family: Cercopithecidae (Old World monkeys)
          - Genus: Chlorocebus
            - Green monkey, Chlorocebus sabaeus LC introduced

== See also ==
- Wildlife of Cape Verde
- List of chordate orders
- Lists of mammals by region
- List of prehistoric mammals
- Mammal classification
- List of mammals described in the 2000s
- List of birds of Cape Verde
- List of reptiles of Cape Verde
- List of amphibians of Cape Verde
