= Hemidactylus boavistensis =

Conservation status
- Near Threatened (IUCN 3.1)

Scientific classification
- Kingdom: Animalia
- Phylum: Chordata
- Class: Reptilia
- Order: Squamata
- Suborder: Gekkota
- Family: Gekkonidae
- Genus: Hemidactylus
- Species: H. boavistensis

Binomial name
- Hemidactylus boavistensis Boulenger, 1906

Synonyms
- Hemidactylus bouvieri boavistensis Loveridge, 1947

Species of lizard

Hemidactylus boavistensis, the Boa Vista leaf-toed gecko, is a species of gecko in the family Gekkonidae. The species is endemic to the Cape Verde Islands. The specific name, boavistensis, refers to the island Boa Vista, one of the islands where it has been found. It has also been found on the island of Sal and the islets of Curral Velho and Sal Rei. It had long been considered a subspecies of Hemidactylus bouvieri but was re-elevated as a separate species in 2008.

The Boa Vista leaf-toed gecko reaches lengths of 50 mm (2.0 in) from snout to vent. The head is relatively broad and the snout narrow with a concave or straight profile on the dorsal surface. It has about 35–38 fine ventral scales across the mid-belly. The first hind toe typically has 5 scales underneath while the fourth toe has 7–9 scales. In comparison, H. bouvieri is smaller, up to 40 mm (1.6 in) from snout to vent, with a narrower head, 20–25 coarse ventral scales, and only 3–4 scales under the first hind toe and 4–5 under the fourth.

Although it is common where it is found, it was listed as a "near threatened" species on the IUCN Red List in 2012 due to its limited distribution, pressures from development, and competition with introduced species such as the house gecko (Hemidactylus angulatus).
