= Rhinotyphlops ataeniatus =

Scientific classification
- Kingdom: Animalia
- Phylum: Chordata
- Class: Reptilia
- Order: Squamata
- Suborder: Serpentes
- Family: Typhlopidae
- Genus: Rhinotyphlops
- Species: R. ataeniatus

Binomial name
- Rhinotyphlops ataeniatus (Boulenger, 1912)

Synonyms
- Typhlops unitaeniatus var. ataeniatus Boulenger, 1912; Typhlops unitaeniatus ataeniatus — Parker, 1949; Typhlops ataeniatus — Gans & Laurent, 1965; Rhinotyphlops ataeniatus — McDiardmid et al., 1999; Letheobia ataeniatus — Broadley & Wallach, 2007; Letheobia ataeniata — Largen & Spawls, 2010; Rhinotyphlops ataeniatus — Hedges et al., 2014

Species of snake

Rhinotyphlops ataeniatus is a species of snake in the family Typhlopidae. The species is endemic to the Horn of Africa.

== Geographic range ==
R. ataeniatus is found in eastern Ethiopia, northeastern Kenya, and Somalia.
