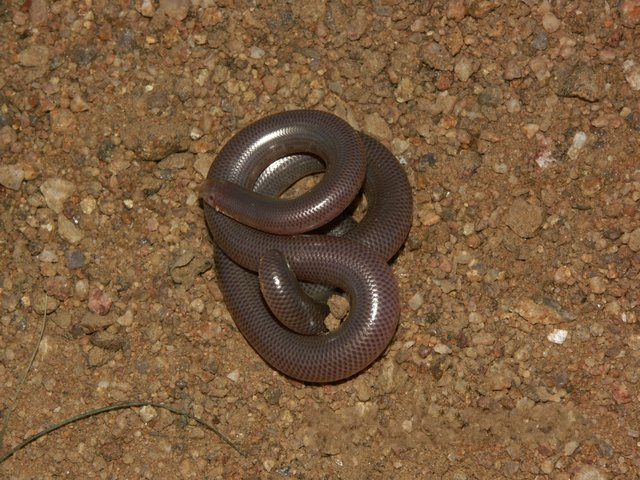

Conservation status
- Least Concern (IUCN 3.1)

Scientific classification
- Kingdom: Animalia
- Phylum: Chordata
- Class: Reptilia
- Order: Squamata
- Suborder: Serpentes
- Family: Typhlopidae
- Genus: Rhinotyphlops
- Species: R. lalandei

Binomial name
- Rhinotyphlops lalandei (Schlegel, 1839)

Synonyms
- Typhlops lalandei Schlegel, 1839; Onychcephalus delalandii A.M.C. Duméril & Bibron, 1844; Typhlops delalandii — Boulenger, 1893; Rhinotyphlops lalandei — Roux-Estève, 1974

= Rhinotyphlops lalandei =

Species of snake

Rhinotyphlops lalandei, known commonly as Delalande's beaked blind snake, is a species of snake in the family Typhlopidae. The species is endemic to southern Africa.

== Etymology ==
The specific name, lalandei, is in honor of French naturalist Pierre Antoine Delalande.

== Description ==
R. lalandei is a slender, pinkish-grey, blind snake, which has a pointed nose that it uses for burrowing.

It may attain a maximum snout-to-vent length (SVL) of 35 cm (13 3/4 in). The dorsal scales are arranged in 26–30 rows around the body. There are more than 300 dorsal scales in the vertebral row.

The nostrils are located below the sharp horizontal cutting edge of the snout. The total length (including tail) is 35 to 50 times the diameter of the body. The tail is as broad as long, or broader than long, ending in a spine.

== Geographic range ==
R. lalandei occurs throughout the eastern half of Southern Africa, as far south as Cape Town and with isolated populations in western parts such as Namibia.

== Habitat ==
R. lalandei can be found in a variety of habitats including semidesert, savannah, coastal bush, and fynbos, at altitudes from sea level to 2,200 m (7,200 ft).

== Reproduction ==
The species R. lalandei is oviparous. The female lays a clutch of 2–4 eggs. The hatchlings are flesh-colored.
