= Rhinotyphlops boylei =

Conservation status
- Least Concern (IUCN 3.1)

Scientific classification
- Kingdom: Animalia
- Phylum: Chordata
- Class: Reptilia
- Order: Squamata
- Suborder: Serpentes
- Family: Typhlopidae
- Genus: Rhinotyphlops
- Species: R. boylei

Binomial name
- Rhinotyphlops boylei (FitzSimons, 1932)

Synonyms
- Typhlops boylei FitzSimons, 1932; Rhinotyphlops boylei — Wallach, 1994

Species of snake

Rhinotyphlops boylei, commonly known as Boyle's beaked blind snake, is a species of snake in the family Typhlopidae. The species is native to southern Africa.

== Etymology ==
The specific name, boylei, is in honor of "A. M. Boyle, Esq.", who collected the holotype.

== Geographic range ==
Indigenous to southern Africa, R. boylei is found from Damaraland in Namibia to western Botswana.

== Description ==
Dorsally, R. boylei is olive-brown, the scales light-edged. Ventrally, it is pale yellow.

Adults may attain a snout-vent length (SVL) of 22 cm (8 1/2 in).

The scales are arranged in 26-28 rows around the body. There are more than 300 dorsal scales in the vertebral row.

== Habitat ==
The preferred natural habitat of R. boylei is sandveld, at altitudes of 1,000–1,400 m (3,300–4,600 ft).

== Reproduction ==
R. boylei is oviparous.
