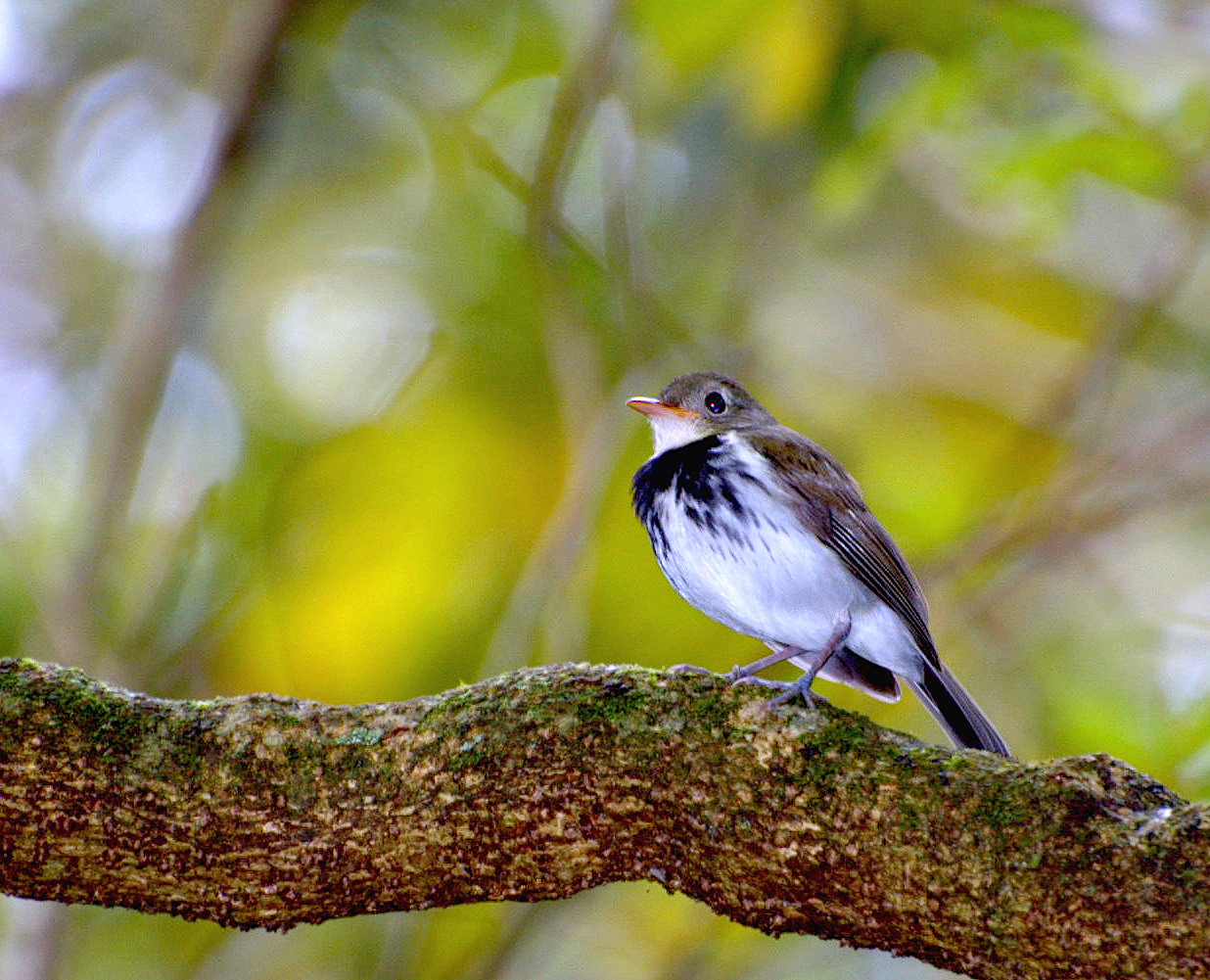
- Southern antpipit (Corythopis delalandi)

Scientific classification
- Kingdom: Animalia
- Phylum: Chordata
- Class: Aves
- Order: Passeriformes
- Family: Tyrannidae
- Genus: Corythopis; Sundevall, 1836

Type species
- Myiothera calcarata Wied-Neuwied=Muscicapa delalandi Lesson, RP, 1831

= Antpipit =

Genus of birds

The antpipits, Corythopis, are a genus of South American birds in the tyrant flycatcher family, Tyrannidae. They are long-legged species that spend most of the time on the ground, which caused them to be placed incorrectly in other taxa.

== Taxonomy ==
The genus Corythopis was introduced in 1836 by the Swedish zoologist Carl Jakob Sundevall to accommodate a single species, Myiothera calcarata Wied-Neuwied, which is therefore the type species by monotypy. This name is a junior synonym of Muscicapa delalandi Lesson, RP, 1931, the southern antpipit. The genus name Corythopis combines the Ancient Greek κορυθων/koruthōn meaning "lark" with ωψ/ōps, ωπος/ōpos meaning "appearance".

The genus contains two species:

Image	Scientific name	Common name	Distribution
	Corythopis torquatus	Ringed antpipit	Amazon Basin of Brazil and the Guianas, and Amazonian Colombia, Ecuador, Peru, Bolivia, Guyana, Suriname, French Guiana, and in eastern Venezuela
	Corythopis delalandi	Southern antpipit	southern Brazil and the pantanal of Paraguay, Bolivia and Brazil
