= Modèle 1939 (mine) =

French anti-personnel bounding mine

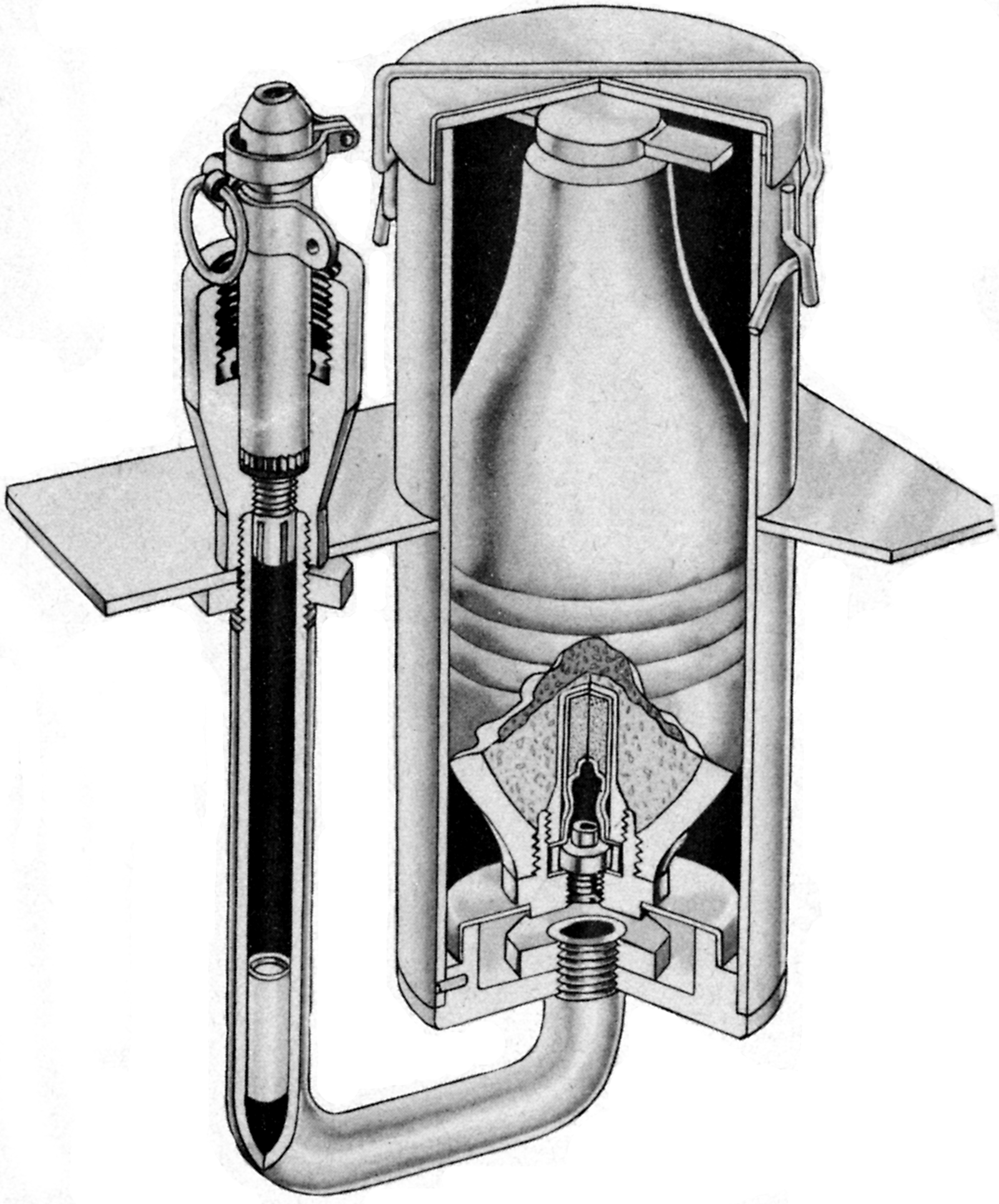
A cross-section of the mine

The Mle 1939 (Model 1939) was a French anti-personnel bounding mine used at the start of the Second World War, it was developed largely in response to the German S-mine bounding mine. It saw very little service before the fall of France. The plans escaped to the US via Major Pierre Delalande, a member of the French Corps of Engineers, and were used as the basis for the American M2 bounding mine which saw wider service during the war but was considered largely ineffective. The M2 mine was replaced almost immediately afterwards with the M16 bounding mine, an almost exact copy of the German S-mine. The French also later produced a copy of the S-mine, the Mle 1951 mine.

== Description ==
The mine consisted of a large cylindrical main body containing a 60 mm mortar shell linked by a steel tube to a fuse holder which held either a pressure fuse or a pull fuse for use with tripwires. A rectangular thin metal plate positioned halfway up the main body of the mine provides additional support. When the fuse is triggered, a flash travels along the steel tube to the base of the main body, where it ignites a 0.8 g black powder charge, launching the mortar shell from the mine and igniting a pyrotechnic delay.

The mine weighs 5.5 lb and is overall 8.25 in high. The metal supporting plate measures 6.4 in by 4 in. The explosive charge consists of 5 ounces of Melinite.

The delay triggers the mine once it has risen to a height of between 0.5 m and 2 m, where it detonates scattering shrapnel.
