= Pierre Antoine Delalande =

French naturalist and explorer (1787–1823)

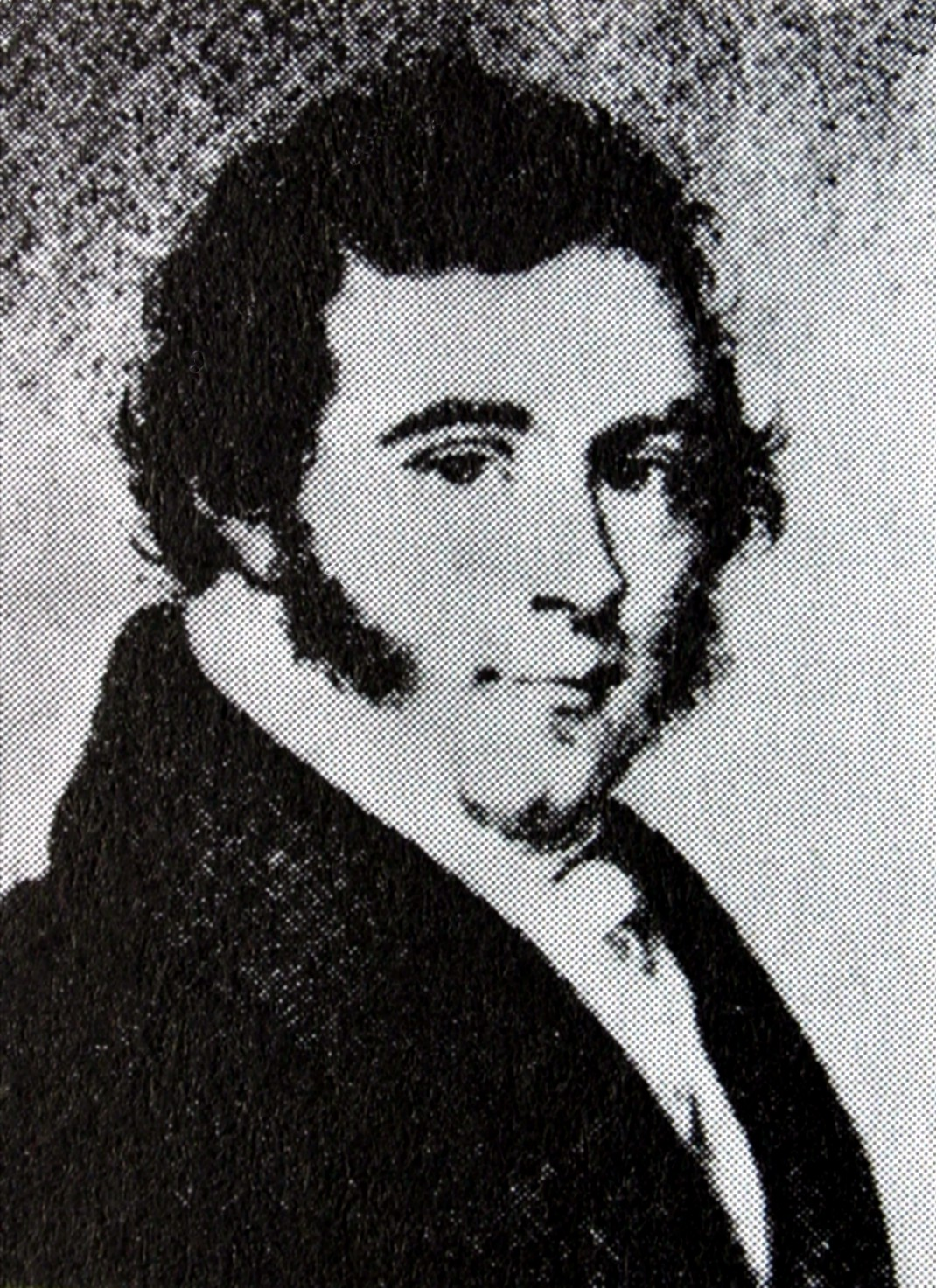
- Born: 27 March 1787
- Died: 27 June 1823 (aged 36)
- Known for: Collection of biological specimens
- Scientific career
- Fields: Naturalist, taxidermist, explorer, painter

Pierre Antoine Delalande (27 March 1787 – 27 June 1823) was a French naturalist, taxidermist, explorer and painter.

== Life ==
Pierre Antoine Delalande was the son of a taxidermist in the National Museum of Natural History in Paris. He was employed at the museum from a young age, where he became an assistant of the naturalist Étienne Geoffroy Saint-Hilaire. He took painting classes from the Flemish animal painter Jean-Baptiste Berré, who was an official painter at the Jardin des Plantes and exhibited landscapes and animal paintings in the Salons of Paris.

Delalande was employed by the National Museum of Natural History to collect natural history specimens. He accompanied the botanist Augustin Saint-Hilaire in 1808 on a zoological collecting trip to Portugal, and was sent to the coast of Provence in 1813 to collect fishes and molluscs. He traveled to Brazil in 1816 to collect specimens for the museum.

In 1818 he began an expedition to South Africa with his nephew Jules Verreaux, who was around 12 years old at the time, to collect specimens. Delalande and Verreaux travelled and collected in South Africa for three years. On their return in 1821, they took back an astounding 131,405 specimens, mostly plant material. Their collection included 288 mammals, 2205 birds, 322 reptiles, 265 fish, 3875 shellfish, and various human skulls and skeletons from a Cape Town cemetery and from the 22 April 1819 Battle of Grahamstown between the British forces under Colonel Willshire and the Xhosa under Nxele.

He is honoured in the specific names of the butterfly, Papilio delalandei; the birds, Corythopis delalandi, Coua delalandei, and Stephanoxis lalandi; the frog, Tomopterna delalandii; the lizards, Chioninia delalandii, Nucras lalandii, and Tarentola delalandii; and the blindsnake, Rhinotyphlops lalandei.
