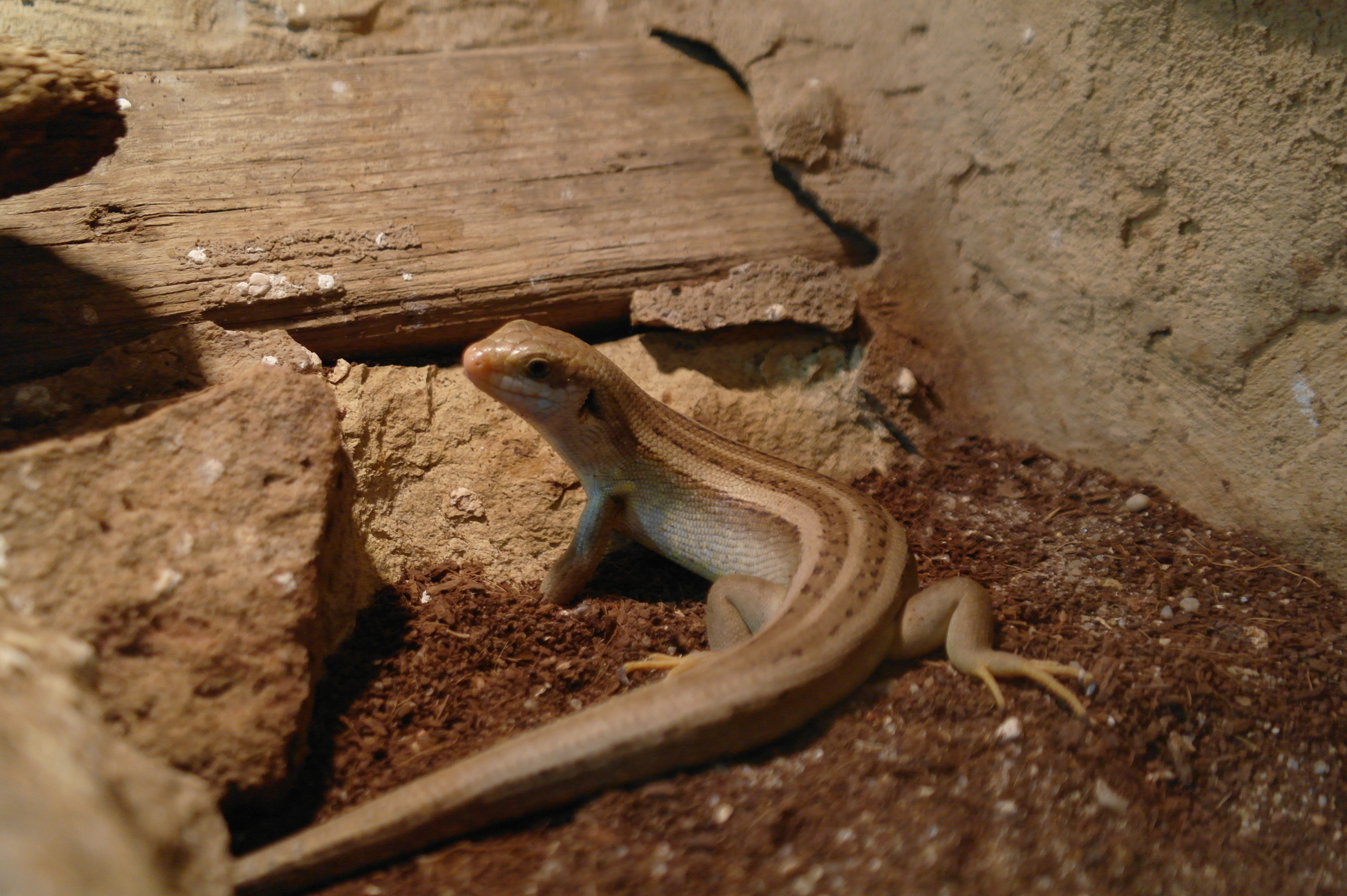
- Vaillant's mabuya (Chioninia vaillantii) in the Prague Zoo

Scientific classification
- Domain: Eukaryota
- Kingdom: Animalia
- Phylum: Chordata
- Class: Reptilia
- Order: Squamata
- Family: Scincidae
- Subfamily: Mabuyinae
- Genus: Chioninia; Gray, 1845

Species
- 7 species, see text

= Chioninia =

Cape Verde mabuyas Temporal range: Late Miocene/Early Pliocene–Recent

Genus of lizards

Chioninia is a genus of skinks, lizards in the subfamily Lygosominae. For long, this genus was included in the "wastebin taxon" Mabuya. The genus Chioninia contains the Cape Verde mabuyas.

== Description ==
Species in the genus Chioninia are mid-sized to largish lizards with cylindrical bodies, tails of medium length, and well-developed arms and legs; the hands and feet have 5 toes each. Their cycloid scales are underlaid by osteoderms. The scales on the back and belly are similar in shape, but those on the back are keeled. The scales on the top of the head are generally flat and subimbricate; they have a pair of supranasal scales and the frontoparietal and prefrontal scales are paired or fused. The third supraocular scale is the hindmost one that contacts the frontal scale, and the secondary temporal scales touch each other. The nasal scale is undivided.

Chioninia mabuyas have 26–27 presacral vertebrae. Their palatine bones are in contact with the median; the deep sphenopalatine notch separates the (toothed or toothless) pterygoids and extends forwards to between the centre of the eyes. The fairly small teeth are pleurodont. The ear opening is small, and the eardrums are hidden in a moderately deep ear canal.

== Species ==
The following 7 species are recognized as being valid:

- Chioninia coctei (A.M.C. Duméril & Bibron, 1839) – Cape Verde giant skink - extinct
- Chioninia delalandii (A.M.C. Duméril & Bibron, 1839) – Delalande's skink
- Chioninia fogoensis (O'Shaughnessy, 1874) – Fogo skink
- Chioninia nicolauensis (Schleich, 1987) – São Nicolau skink
- Chioninia spinalis (Boulenger, 1906)
- Chioninia stangeri (Gray, 1845) – Stanger's skink
- Chioninia vaillantii (Boulenger, 1887) – Vaillant's mabuya

Nota bene: A binomial authority in parentheses indicates that the species was originally described in a genus other than Chioninia.
