= Hemidactylus bouvieri =

Conservation status
- Critically Endangered (IUCN 3.1)

Scientific classification
- Kingdom: Animalia
- Phylum: Chordata
- Class: Reptilia
- Order: Squamata
- Suborder: Gekkota
- Family: Gekkonidae
- Genus: Hemidactylus
- Species: H. bouvieri

Binomial name
- Hemidactylus bouvieri (Bocourt, 1870)

Synonyms
- Emydactylus bouvieri Bocourt, 1870; Hemidactylus cessacii Bocage, 1873; Hemidactylus bouvieri — Rochebrune, 1884

Species of lizard

Hemidactylus bouvieri, also known commonly as Bouvier's leaf-toed gecko and the Cape Verde leaf-toed gecko, is a species of lizard in the family Gekkonidae. The species is endemic to the Cape Verde Islands and is listed as critically endangered. There are two recognized subspecies.

== Geographic range ==
In the Cape Verde Islands H. bouvieri has been found on the islands of São Vicente, Santo Antão, Santa Luzia, São Nicolau, Santiago and Ilhéu Raso.

== Taxonomy and etymology ==
H. bouvieri was originally described and named by Marie Firmin Bocourt in 1870. The specific name, bouvieri, is in honor of French zoologist Aimé Bouvier (died 1919).

== Habitat ==
The preferred natural habitats of H. bouvieri are grassland and shrubland, at altitudes of 250–700 m (820–2,300 ft).

== Reproduction ==
H. bouvieri is oviparous.

== Subspecies ==
There are two subspecies which are considered to be valid, including the nominotypical subspecies.

- Hemidactylus bouvieri bouvieri (Bocourt, 1870)
- Hemidactylus bouvieri razoensis Gruber & Schleich, 1982

The former subspecies, Hemidactylus bouvieri boavistensis Boulenger, 1906, is considered a separate species, Hemidactylus boavistensis.

Nota bene: A trinomial authority in parentheses indicates that the subspecies was originally described in a genus other than Hemidactylus.
