= Chioninia fogoensis =

Conservation status
- Least Concern (IUCN 3.1)

Scientific classification
- Kingdom: Animalia
- Phylum: Chordata
- Class: Reptilia
- Order: Squamata
- Family: Scincidae
- Genus: Chioninia
- Species: C. fogoensis

Binomial name
- Chioninia fogoensis (O'Shaugnessy, 1874)

Synonyms
- Euprepes fogoensis O'shaughnessy, 1874; Mabuya fogoensis (O'shaughnessy, 1874)

Species of lizard

Chioninia fogoensis (English: Fogo skink or Santo Antão skink) is a species of skink in the family Scincidae. It is endemic to the island of Santo Antão, Cape Verde. The species was named by Arthur William Edgar O'Shaughnessy in 1874. After revision of the species in 2010 based on molecular evidence, it no longer includes the skinks of São Nicolau (Chioninia nicolauensis), nor of the original type locality Fogo (hence the species name fogoensis).

== Introduced populations ==
In 2020, the presence of Chioninia fogoensis was confirmed on the island of Madeira after an individual stowed away in a holidaymaker's bag and ended up in the United Kingdom before discovery.

== Original publication ==
- O'Shaughnessy, 1874 : A description of a new species of Scincidae in the collection of the British Museum. Annals and Magazine of Natural History, series 4, vol. 3, p. 298-301 (full text).
