= Chioninia spinalis =

Conservation status
- Least Concern (IUCN 3.1)

Scientific classification
- Kingdom: Animalia
- Phylum: Chordata
- Class: Reptilia
- Order: Squamata
- Suborder: Scinciformata
- Infraorder: Scincomorpha
- Family: Mabuyidae
- Genus: Chioninia
- Species: C. spinalis

Binomial name
- Chioninia spinalis (Boulenger, 1906)

Synonyms
- Mabuya spinalis Boulenger, 1906; Mabuia salensis Angel, 1935; Mabuya stangeri maioensis Mertens, 1955

Species of lizard

Chioninia spinalis is a species of skink in the family Scincidae. It is endemic to the Cape Verde Islands, and has been found on the islands of Sal, Boa Vista, Maio, Santiago, Fogo and several smaller islets.

== Subspecies ==
There are five subspecies:

- Chioninia spinalis boavistensis Miralles, Vasconcelos, Perera, Harris & Carranza, 2010
- Chioninia spinalis maioensis (Mertens, 1955)
- Chioninia spinalis salensis (Angel, 1935)
- Chioninia spinalis santiagoensis Miralles, Vasconcelos, Perera, Harris & Carranza, 2010
- Chioninia spinalis spinalis (Boulenger, 1906)

== Publications ==
- Angel, 1935 : Lézards des Îles du Cap Vert, rapportés par M. le Professeur Chevalier. Description de espèces nouvelles (Lizards of the Cape Verde Islands). Bulletin by the Museum of Natural History, Paris, series 2, vol. VII p. 165-169
- Boulenger, 1906 : Report on the reptiles collected by the late L. Fea in West Africa. Annali di Museo Civico di Storia Naturale di Genova (Annals of the Genoa Civic Museum of Natural History), series 3, vol. II, p. 196-216
- Mertens, 1955 : Die Eidechsen der Kapverden. Commentationes biologicae, vol. 15, no. 15, p. 1-16
