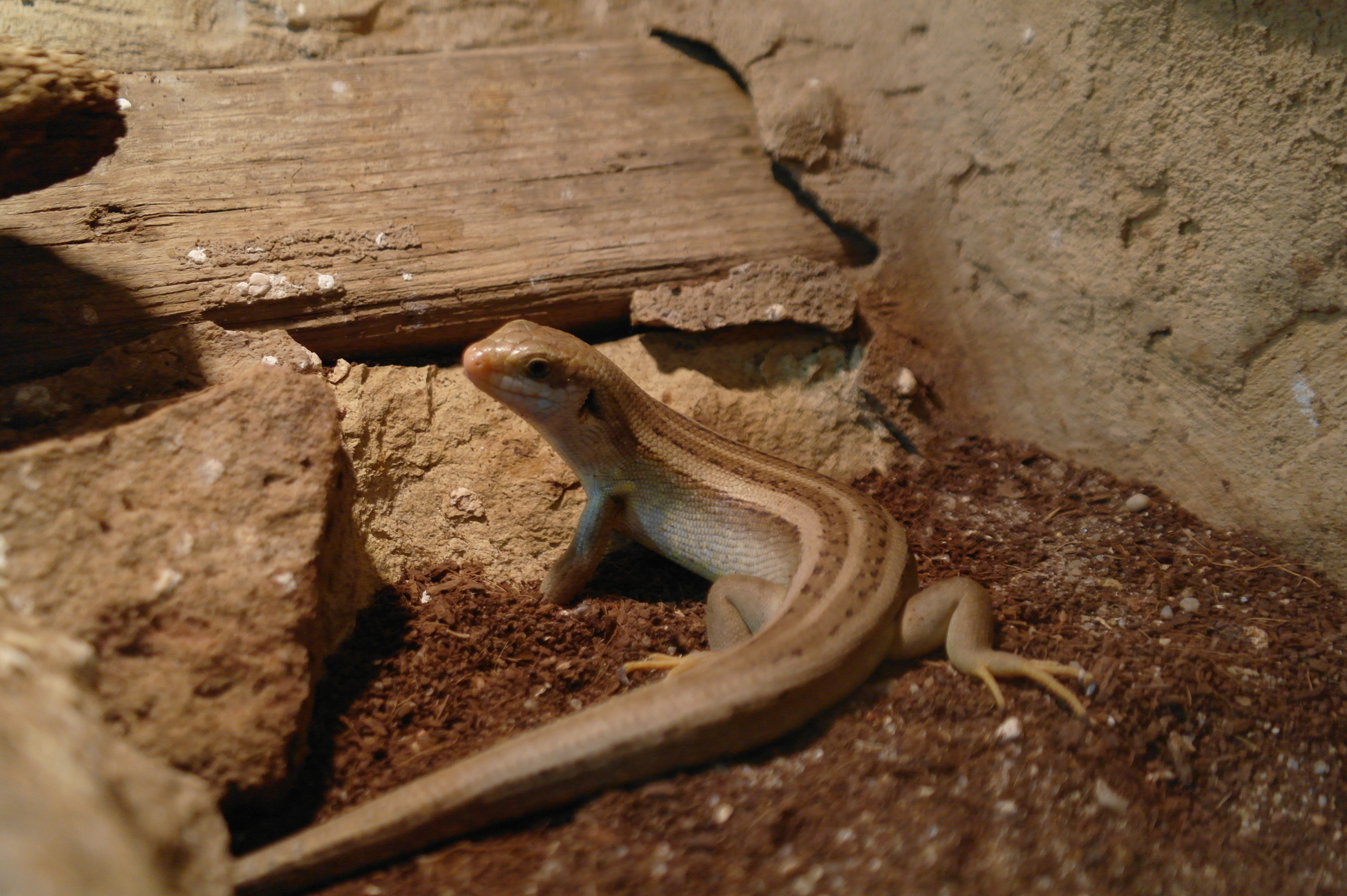
- Vaillant's skink in the Prague Zoo

Conservation status
- Endangered (IUCN 3.1)

Scientific classification
- Kingdom: Animalia
- Phylum: Chordata
- Class: Reptilia
- Order: Squamata
- Family: Scincidae
- Genus: Chioninia
- Species: C. vaillantii

Binomial name
- Chioninia vaillantii (Boulenger, 1887)

Synonyms
- Mabuia vaillantii Boulenger, 1887; Mabuya vaillantii — Greer, 1976; Chioninia vaillantii — Mausfeld et al., 2002

= Vaillant's mabuya =

Chioninia vaillantii

Species of lizard

Chioninia vaillantii, also known commonly as Vaillant's mabuya or Vaillant's skink, is a species of skink in the family Scincidae. The species is endemic to the Cape Verde Islands. There are two recognized subspecies.

== Conservation status ==
C. vaillantii is listed as endangered by the IUCN because the species occurs as a very fragmented population, and the quality of its habitat is declining.

== Geographic range ==
Vaillant's mabuya occurs on the islands Fogo and Santiago, and the islet Ilhéu de Cima.

== Habitat ==
The preferred natural habitat of C. vaillantii is shrubland.

== Reproduction ==
C. vaillantii is viviparous.

== Subspecies ==
Two subspecies are recognized as being valid including the nominotypical subspecies.

- Chioninia vaillantii vaillantii (Boulenger, 1887)
- Chioninia vaillantii xanthotis Miralles, Vasconcelos, Perera, Harris & Carranza, 2010

Nota bene: A trinomial authority in parentheses indicates that the subspecies was originally described in a genus other than Chioninia.

== Etymology ==
The specific name, vaillantii, is in honor of French herpetologist Léon Louis Vaillant.
