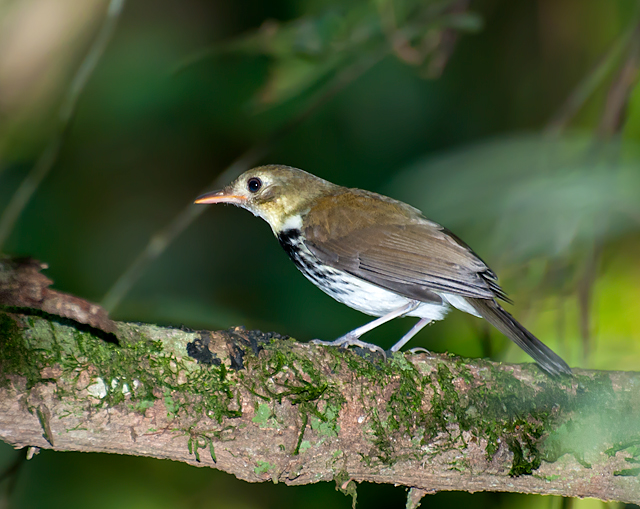
- In Piraju, São Paulo, Brazil

Conservation status
- Least Concern (IUCN 3.1)

Scientific classification
- Kingdom: Animalia
- Phylum: Chordata
- Class: Aves
- Order: Passeriformes
- Family: Tyrannidae
- Genus: Corythopis
- Species: C. delalandi

Binomial name
- Corythopis delalandi (Lesson, 1831)

= Southern antpipit =

Species of bird

The southern antpipit (Corythopis delalandi) is a species of bird in the family Tyrannidae, the tyrant flycatchers. It is found Argentina, Bolivia, Brazil, and Paraguay.

== Taxonomy and systematics ==
The southern antpipit was originally described as Muscicapa delalandi, a member of the Old World flycatcher family Muscicapidae. It was eventually moved to genus Corythopis in the gnateater family Conopophagidae. Some authors later suggested that it belonged to family Formicariidae, the antthrushes. A study published in 1968 placed the genus in its current family, but there is still uncertanty about where it belongs. The southern antpipit shares genus Corythopis with the ringed antpipit (C. toquatus). They are treated as a superspecies and have been suggested to be conspecific.

The southern antpipit is monotypic.

== Description ==
The southern antpipit is 13 to 14 cm (5.1 to 5.5 in) long and weighs 14 to 18 g (0.49 to 0.63 oz). The sexes have the same plumage. Adults have a grayish olive crown, a faint whitish loral spot, and a faint whitish spot behind the eye on an otherwise pale grayish olive face. Their upperparts, wings, and tail are olive. Their chin and throat are creamy white. Their underparts are mostly white with an almost solid black "necklace" on the breast from which black streaks extend along the flanks. The flanks also have a grayish olive wash. Juveniles resemble adults. Both sexes have a medium to dark brown iris, a blackish maxilla, a pale pinkish mandible with a yellow to pinkish orange base, and long pale grayish pink legs.

== Distribution and habitat ==
The southern antpipit is a bird of the southern Atlantic Forest. It is found in eastern Bolivia's Santa Cruz and Tarija departments, in northern Argentina's Salta, Misiones, and Corrientes provinces, in eastern Paraguay, and in southern Brazil from those countries northeast to southern Maranhão, east to Minas Gerais, and south to northwestern Rio Grande do Sul. The species inhabits tropical lowland forest both primary and secondary. In elevation it occurs from sea level to 1,000 m (3,300 ft) but mostly is found below 800 m (2,600 ft).

== Behavior ==
=== Movement ===
The southern antpipit is a year-round resident throughout its range.

=== Feeding ===
The southern antpipit feeds primarily on arthropods and occasionally includes lizards and frogs in its diet. It usually forages alone, never joining mixed-species feeding flocks. It walks slowly on the forest floor and along downed logs, bobbing its head and tail. It takes prey mostly by jumping up to take it from the underside of leaves with an audible snap of the bill.

=== Breeding ===
The southern antpipit's breeding season includes October to December but has not been fully defined. Its nest is an oven-shaped dome with a side entrance on the forest floor. It has a base of leaf litter, an outer shell of green moss with leaves, and a lining of thin plant fibers. The clutch is two or three eggs. The incubation period is not known. Fledging occurs about 14 days after hatch and both parents provision nestlings.

=== Vocalization ===
The southern antpipit's song is a "very high, short, calm, sweet series 'weeh-rrwee-wurr-wiwi' ('rrr' very short, canary-like trills)".

== Status ==
The IUCN has assessed the southern antpipit as being of Least Concern. It has a very large range; its population size is not known and is believed to be decreasing. No immediate threats have been identified. It is considered fairly common overall and occurs in several protected areas in Brazil. It is "[r]ather tolerant of disturbed habitats, and found even in small and seriously degraded forest fragments".
