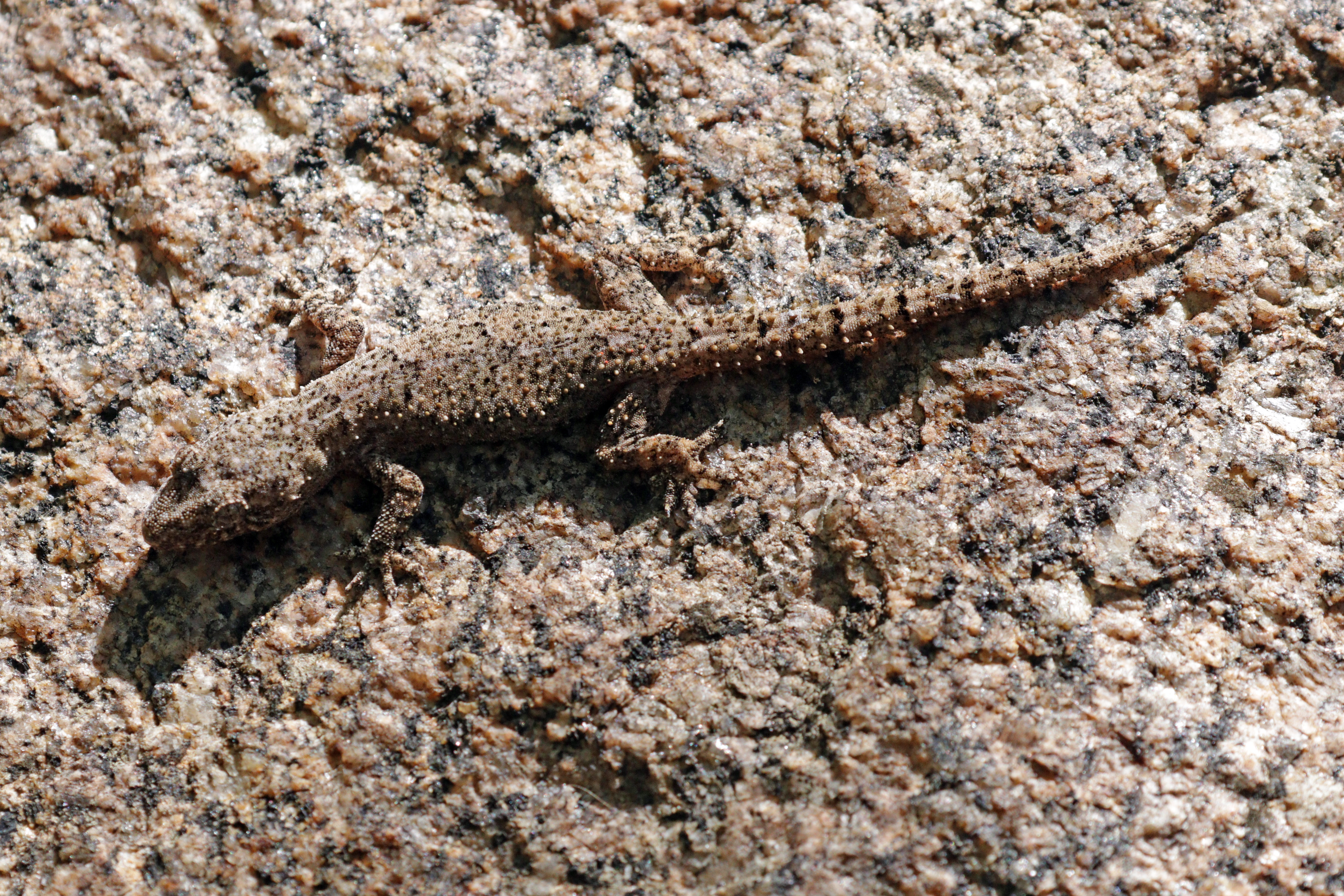

Conservation status
- Least Concern (IUCN 3.1)

Scientific classification
- Kingdom: Animalia
- Phylum: Chordata
- Class: Reptilia
- Order: Squamata
- Suborder: Gekkota
- Family: Gekkonidae
- Genus: Hemidactylus
- Species: H. mercatorius

Binomial name
- Hemidactylus mercatorius Gray, 1842

Synonyms
- Hemidactylus gardineri; Hemidactylus persimilis; Hemidactylus mandanus

= Hemidactylus mercatorius =

Species of lizard

The merchant gecko (Hemidactylus mercatorius) is a species of gecko. There has been confusion between it and Hemidactylus mabouia, making it difficult to establish the ranges of the species. While the Reptile Database gives Hemidactylus mercatorius a wide distribution in eastern Africa, the IUCN restricts its native distribution to Madagascar and some other islands in the Indian Ocean (the Comoros, Seychelles, Mayotte).
