= Chioninia nicolauensis =

Conservation status
- Least Concern (IUCN 3.1)

Scientific classification
- Kingdom: Animalia
- Phylum: Chordata
- Class: Reptilia
- Order: Squamata
- Suborder: Scinciformata
- Infraorder: Scincomorpha
- Family: Mabuyidae
- Genus: Chioninia
- Species: C. nicolauensis

Binomial name
- Chioninia nicolauensis (Schleich, 1987)

Synonyms
- Mabuya fogoensis nicolauensis (Schleich, 1987)

Species of lizard

Chioninia nicolauensis (English: São Nicolau skink) is a species of skinks in the family Scincidae. It is endemic to the Cape Verde island of São Nicolau. Until around 2010, it was treated as a subspecies of Chioninia fogoensis.
