= Delalande's skink =

Conservation status
- Least Concern (IUCN 3.1)

Scientific classification
- Kingdom: Animalia
- Phylum: Chordata
- Class: Reptilia
- Order: Squamata
- Family: Scincidae
- Genus: Chioninia
- Species: C. delalandii

Binomial name
- Chioninia delalandii (A.M.C. Duméril & Bibron, 1839)

Synonyms
- Euprepes delalandii A.M.C. Duméril & Bibron, 1839; Mabuia delalandii — Boulenger, 1887; Mabuya delalandii — Joger, 1993; Chioninia delalandii — Mausfeld et al., 2002

Species of lizard

Chioninia delalandii (English: Delalande's skink) is a species of skink, a lizard in the family Scincidae. The species is endemic to the Cape Verde Islands.

== Etymology ==
The species is named after French naturalist Pierre Antoine Delalande.
