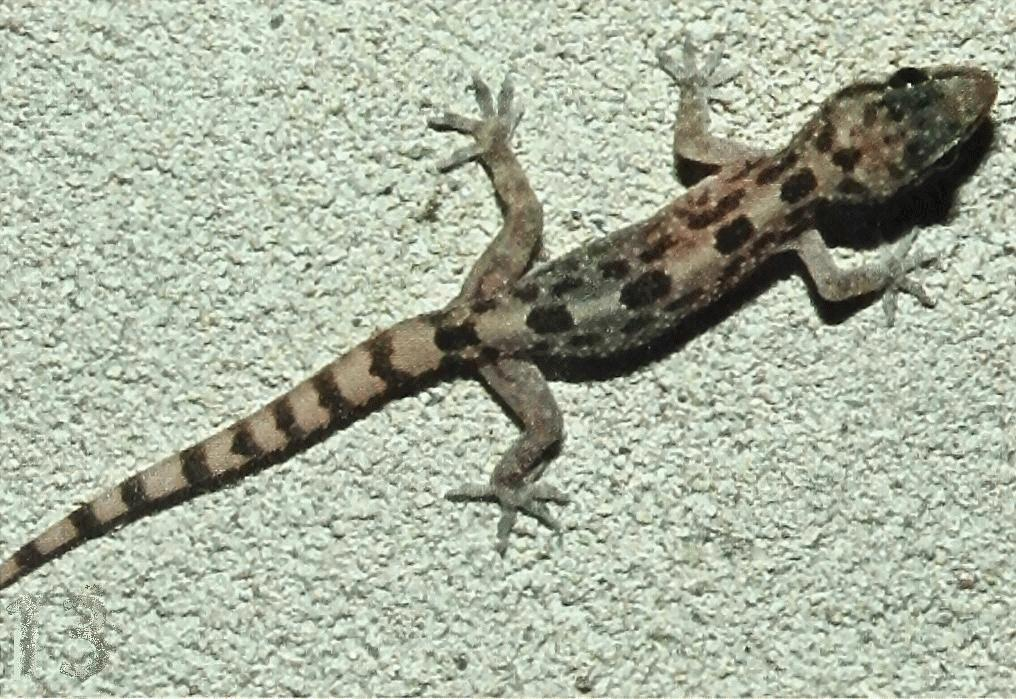

Conservation status
- Least Concern (IUCN 3.1)

Scientific classification
- Kingdom: Animalia
- Phylum: Chordata
- Class: Reptilia
- Order: Squamata
- Suborder: Gekkota
- Family: Gekkonidae
- Genus: Hemidactylus
- Species: H. angulatus

Binomial name
- Hemidactylus angulatus Hallowell, 1854

Synonyms
- Hemidactylus brookii angulatus; Hemidactylus cyanodactylus; Hemidactylus cyanogaster; Hemidactylus haitianus; Hemidactylus leightoni

= Hemidactylus angulatus =

Species of reptile

Hemidactylus angulatus is a species of gecko. It is found in central and western Africa, as well as introduced to Cape Verde, Hispaniola (the Dominican Republic and Haiti), Puerto Rico, and Cuba in the Caribbean, and Ecuador and Colombia in South America.
