= Modèle 1951 (mine) =

Anti-personnel mine

The Mle 1951 (Model 1951) was a French bounding anti-personnel mine copied from German S-mine 44 after the end of the Second World War. A later variant was designated the Mle 1955 (Model 1955).

Like the S-Mine when triggered the mine is launched by a small propelling charge, a trip wire is trailed behind the mine. When the tripwire pulls taught it triggers the mines main charge, scattering shrapnel to a maximum range of 50 yards.

== Specifications ==
- Diameter: 3.9 inches
- Height: 6.3 inches
- Weight: 9.9 lbs
- Explosive content: 0.9 lbs of Picric acid
