= List of reptiles of the Atlantic Ocean =

The reptiles that inhabit the Atlantic Ocean include six species of sea turtles. In addition, two species of crocodiles regularly venture into saltwater thanks to lingual glands that allow them to excrete salt.

Finally, some other species of crocodilians, caimans, and alligators that live in the freshwater and brackish coastal waters of the Americas and Africa can temporarily enter the saltwater of the Atlantic Ocean.

== Order: Testudines ==
=== Family: Dermochelyidae ===
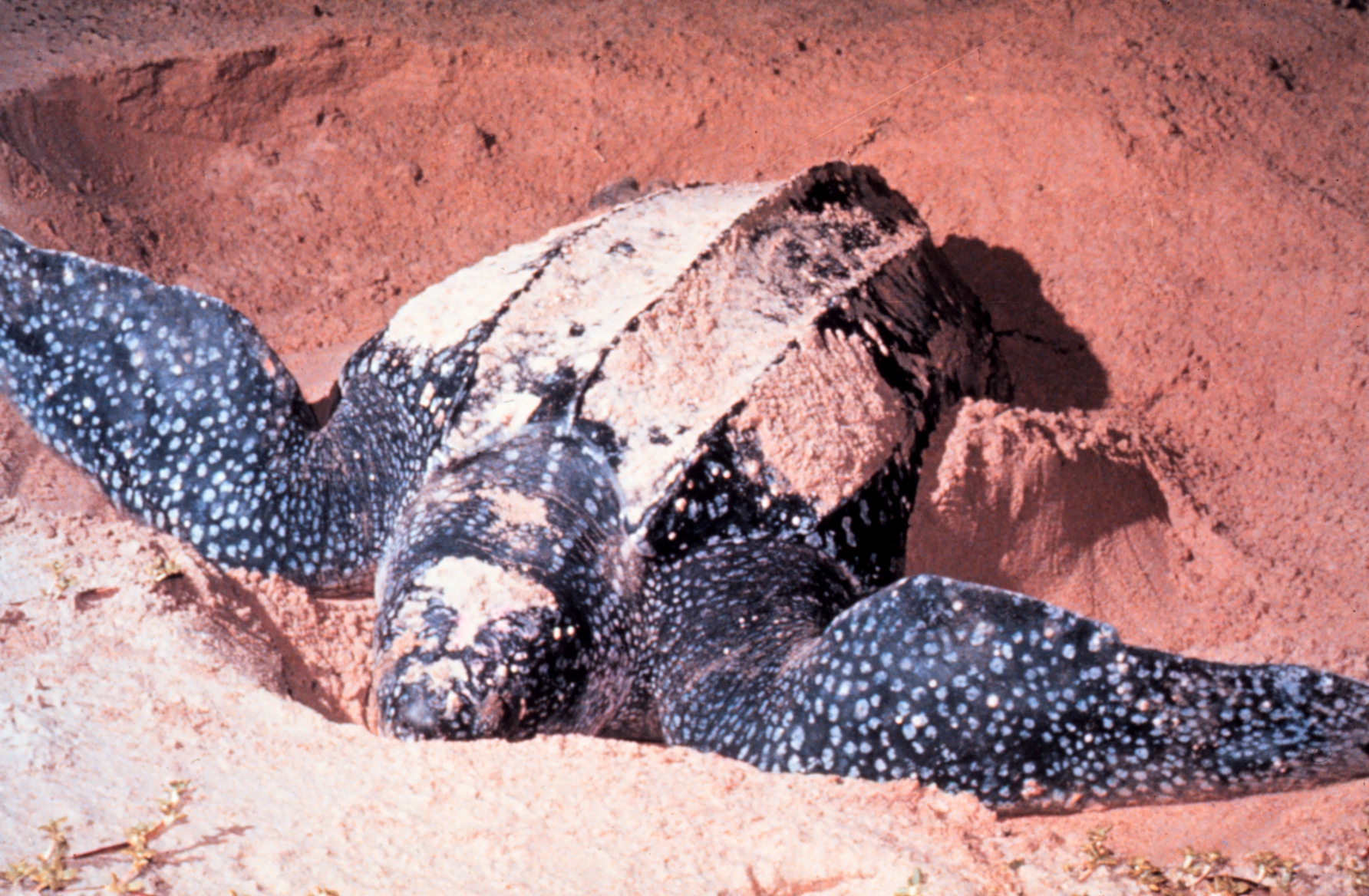
Leatherback sea turtle.

- Genus: Dermochelys
  - Leatherback sea turtle, Dermochelys coriacea VU

=== Family: Cheloniidae ===
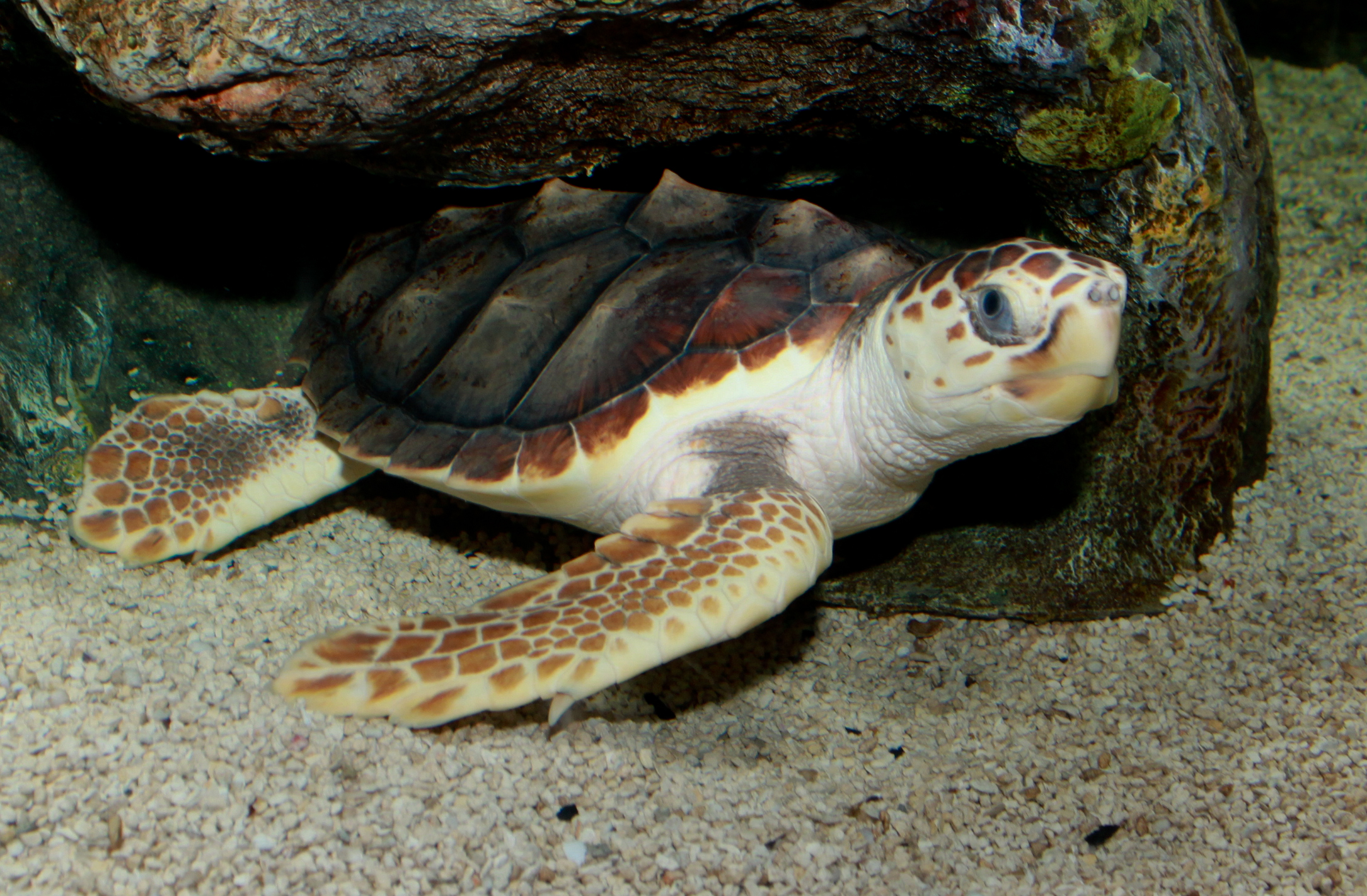
Loggerhead sea turtle.

- Genus: Caretta
  - Loggerhead sea turtle, Caretta caretta VU
- Genus: Chelonia
  - Green sea turtle, Chelonia mydas LC
- Genus: Eretmochelys
  - Hawksbill sea turtle, Eretmochelys imbricata CR
- Genus: Lepidochelys
  - Kemp's ridley sea turtle, Lepidochelys kempii CR
  - Olive ridley sea turtle, Lepidochelys olivacea VU

== Order: Crocodilia ==
=== Family: Crocodylidae ===
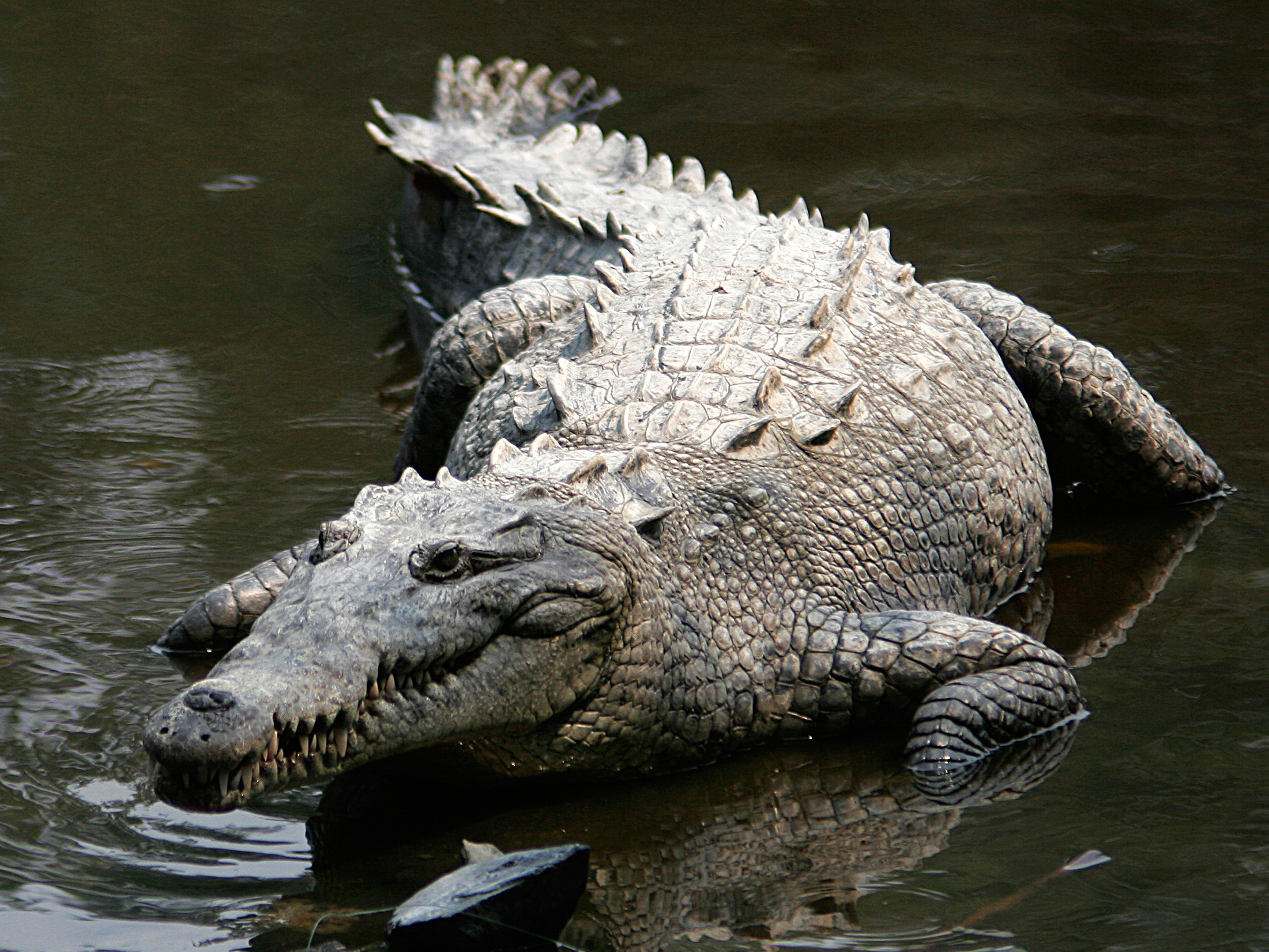
American crocodile.

- Genus: Crocodylus
  - American crocodile, Crocodylus acutus VU
  - Nile crocodile, Crocodylus niloticus LC

== See also ==
- List of reptiles of the Mediterranean Sea
