= List of reptiles of the Mediterranean Sea =

The reptiles of the Mediterranean Sea are limited to four species of sea turtles: the leatherback sea turtle, the loggerhead sea turtle, the green sea turtle, and the hawksbill sea turtle. In addition, wanderers from other Atlantic species — the olive ridley sea turtle and the Kemp's ridley sea turtle — are commonly found.

== Order: Testudines ==
=== Family: Dermochelyidae ===
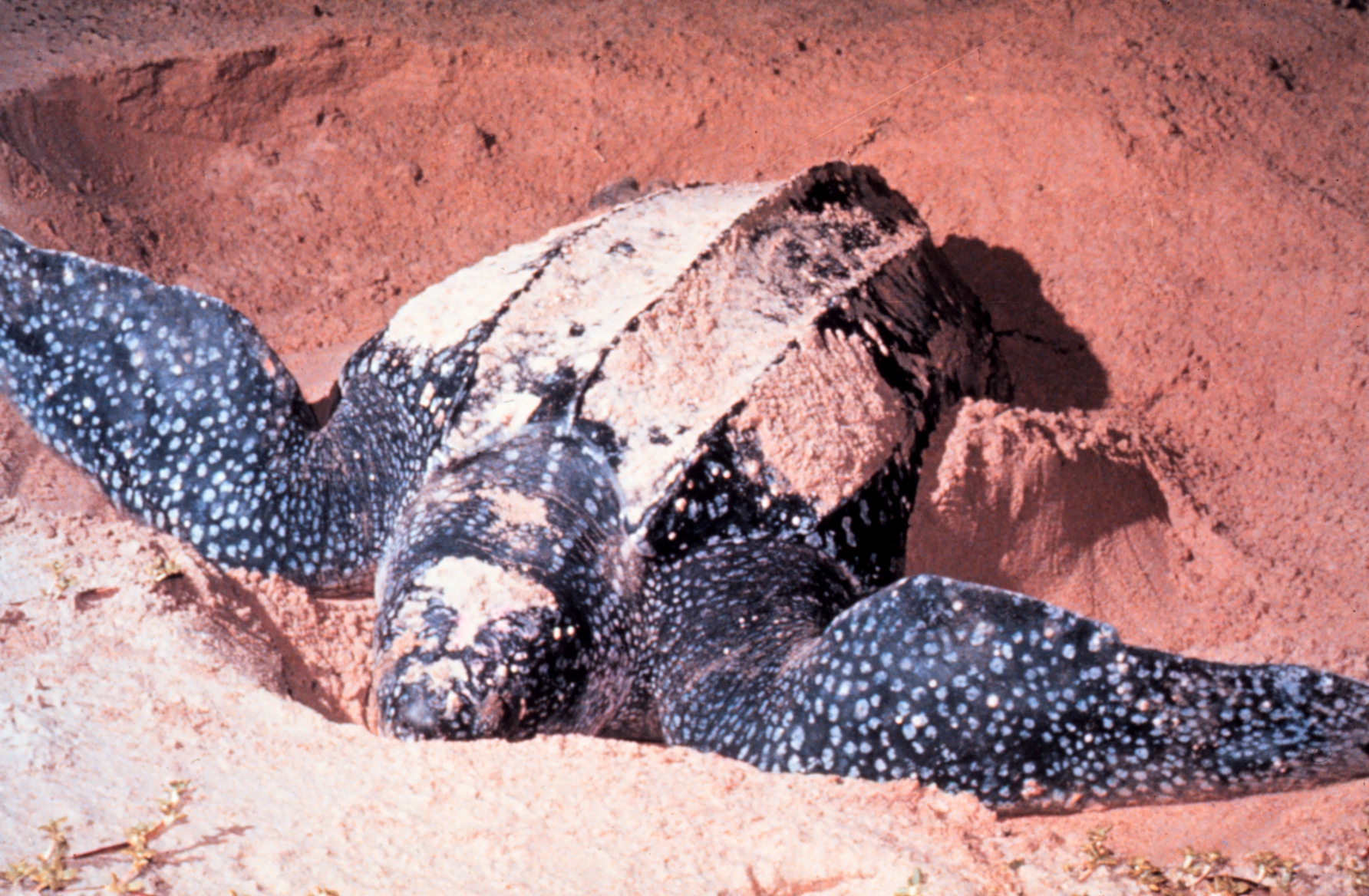
Leatherback sea turtle.

- Genus: Dermochelys
  - Leatherback sea turtle, Dermochelys coriacea VU

=== Family: Cheloniidae ===
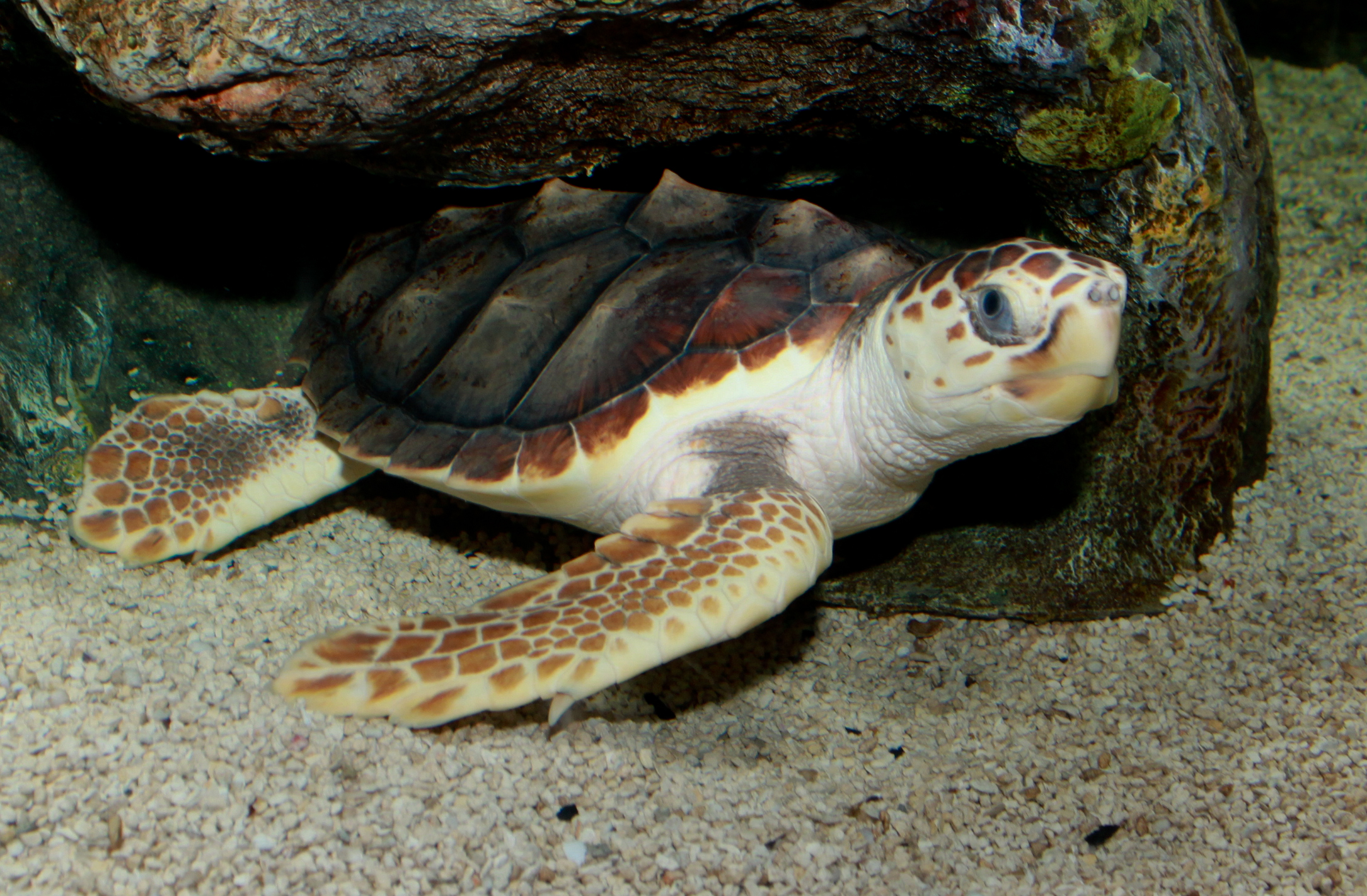
Loggerhead sea turtle.

- Genus: Caretta
  - Loggerhead sea turtle, Caretta caretta VU
- Genus: Chelonia
  - Green sea turtle, Chelonia mydas LC
- Genus: Eretmochelys
  - Hawksbill sea turtle, Eretmochelys imbricata CR

== See also ==
- List of reptiles of the Atlantic Ocean
- List of mammals of the Mediterranean Sea
- List of fishes of the Mediterranean Sea
