= Texas State Aquarium =

Aquarium in Corpus Christi, Texas, United States

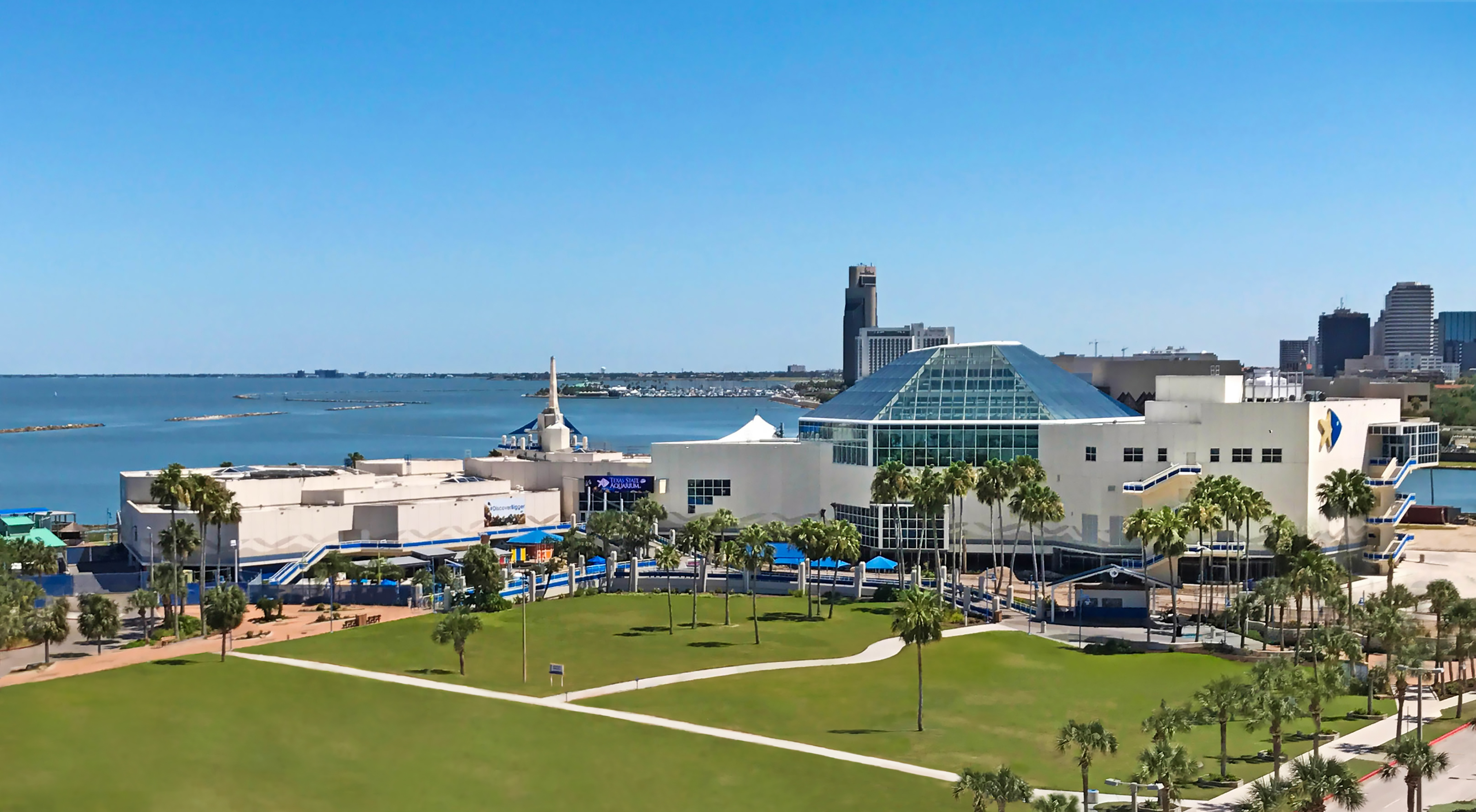
- The Texas State Aquarium
- Interactive map of Texas State Aquarium
- 27°48′50″N 97°23′32″W
- Date opened: July 6, 1990
- Location: Corpus Christi, Texas, United States
- Land area: 6.3 acres (2.5 ha)
- Volume of largest tank: 400,000 US gal (1,500,000 L)
- Annual visitors: 530,950
- Memberships: AZA
- Website: www.texasstateaquarium.org

The Texas State Aquarium is a nonprofit aquarium located in Corpus Christi, Texas, United States. The aquarium aims to promote environmental conservation and rehabilitation of the wildlife of the Gulf of Mexico and has been accredited by the Association of Zoos and Aquariums (AZA) since 1995. Currently the largest aquarium in Texas and also one of the largest aquaria in the United States.

== History ==
Originally conceived by a coalition led by the Junior League of Corpus Christi, and named the Gulf Coast Zoological and Botanical Society, the organization changed its name to the Corpus Christi Aquarium Association in 1978, and then to Texas State Aquarium Association in 1986 after the Texas State Legislature designated it the "State Aquarium of Texas". Despite its name, it receives no state funding.

After more than 20 years of fundraising, planning, and building, the Texas State Aquarium opened its first exhibit to the public on July 6, 1990. In 1993, it became a federally permitted animal rehabilitation facility, and in 1995, it was accredited by the Association of Zoos and Aquariums (AZA).

On May 13, 2017, the Texas State Aquarium opened Caribbean Journey, an expansion that doubled its size and added new exhibits, including a 400,000-gallon shark exhibit, a jungle aviary, and a 4D theater.

The president and chief executive officer of the aquarium is Jesse Gilbert.

== Exhibits ==
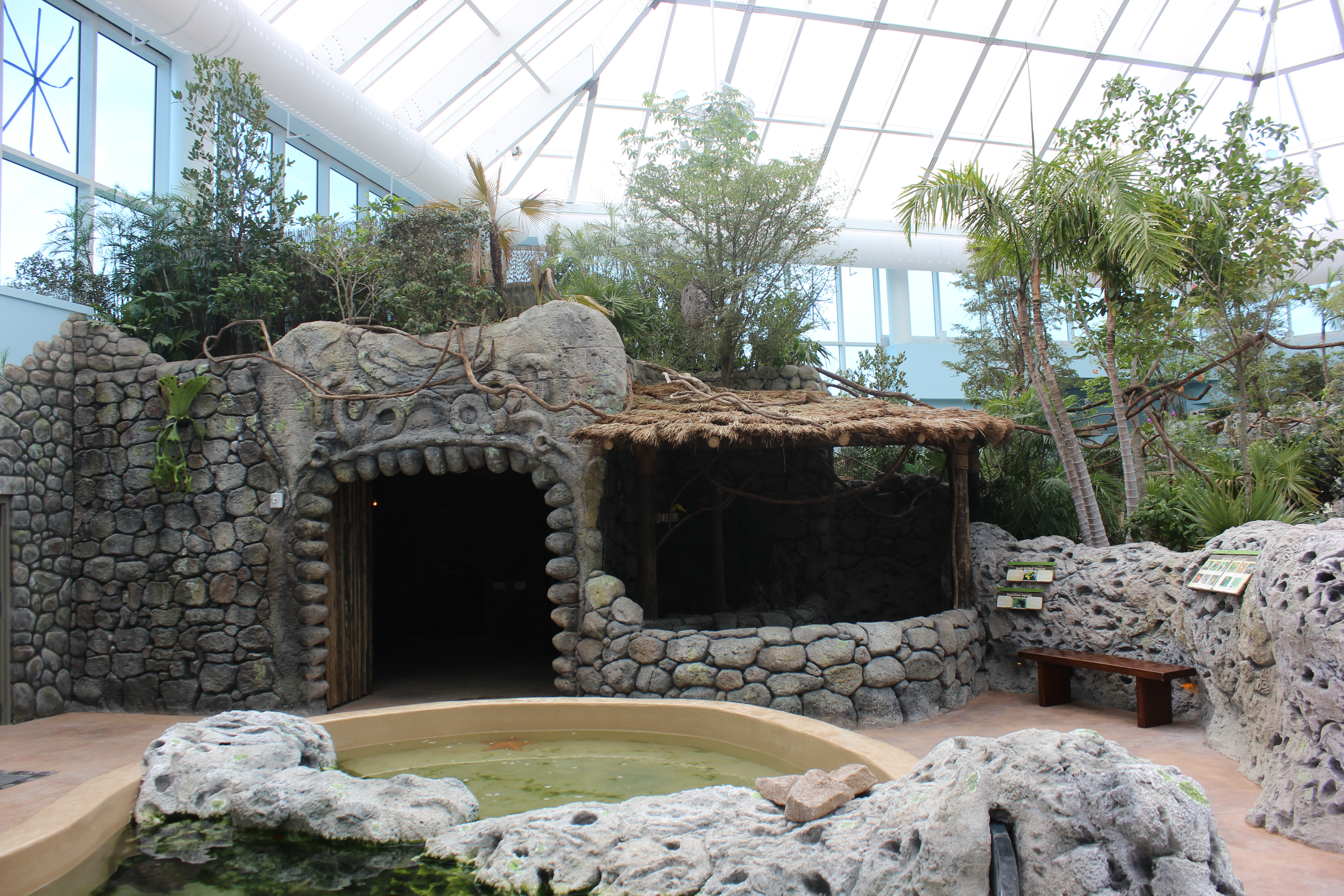
The Maya Ruins in Caribbean Journey's jungle houses vampire bats and reptiles.

The animals in this aquarium are often relocated, so this page may not reflect the most recent changes. Exhibits may include the following:

- Caribbean Jungle: Featuring flamingos, free-flying birds, a two-toed sloth, and other species in a naturally lit jungle habitat, guests walk along a simulated jungle pathway and can look into the aquatic exhibits below.
- H-E-B Caribbean Sea: This 400,000 gal (1,500,000 L) aquatic exhibit contains sandbar sharks, stingrays, and other species. Guests can view the exhibit from the longest acrylic display window in North America or walk through an acrylic tunnel.
- Coral Reef: Replicating the features of the Mesoamerican Barrier Reef off the coast of the Sian Ka’an Biosphere Reserve, the Coral Reef exhibit gives a look at a marine ecosystem and the species that reside there. Species include angelfish, goatfish, butterflyfish, and parrotfish.

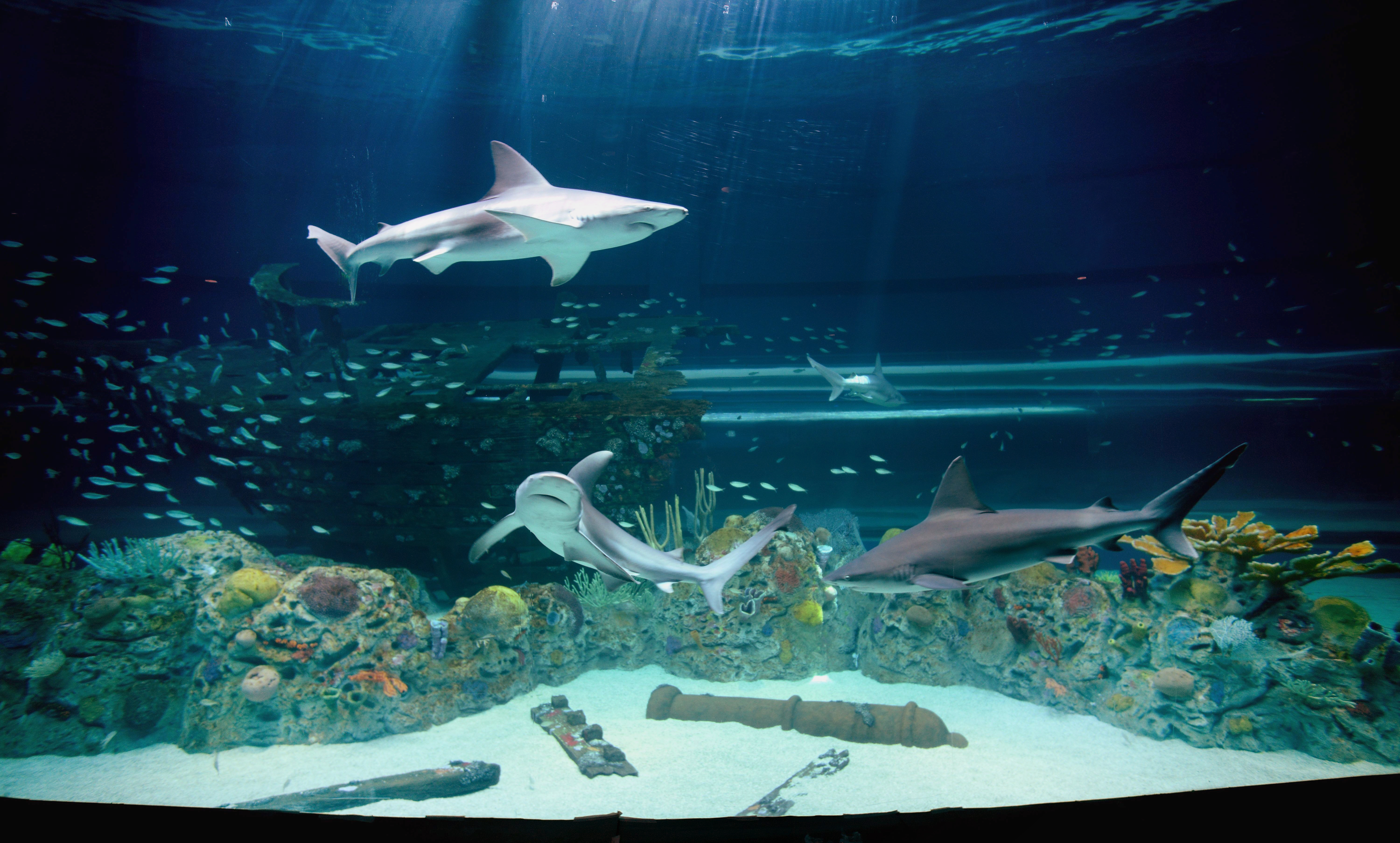
The 400,000 gal H-E-B Caribbean Sea exhibits sandbar sharks among a replica shipwreck.

- Blue Hole: This exhibit showcases a blue hole, deep underwater caverns that can descend hundreds of feet below sea level. Guests can step inside an acrylic "bubble" to view this exhibit from an underwater perspective.
- Dolphin Bay: This 400,000 gal saltwater exhibit houses four Atlantic bottlenose dolphins: Liko, Schooner, Shadow, and Kai. The dolphins put on an educational dolphin presentation, two to three times per day (depending on the season), so visitors may speak with trainers about how they interact with their dolphins and learn more about how to conserve and protect the world's oceans.
- Eagle Pass: All of the raptors formerly featured in this exhibit were rehabilitated at the Texas State Aquarium and cannot be released back into the wild. This exhibit has previously housed a bald eagle named Grace and a golden eagle named Bonnie. It currently houses two ocelots named Milla and Leeloo.

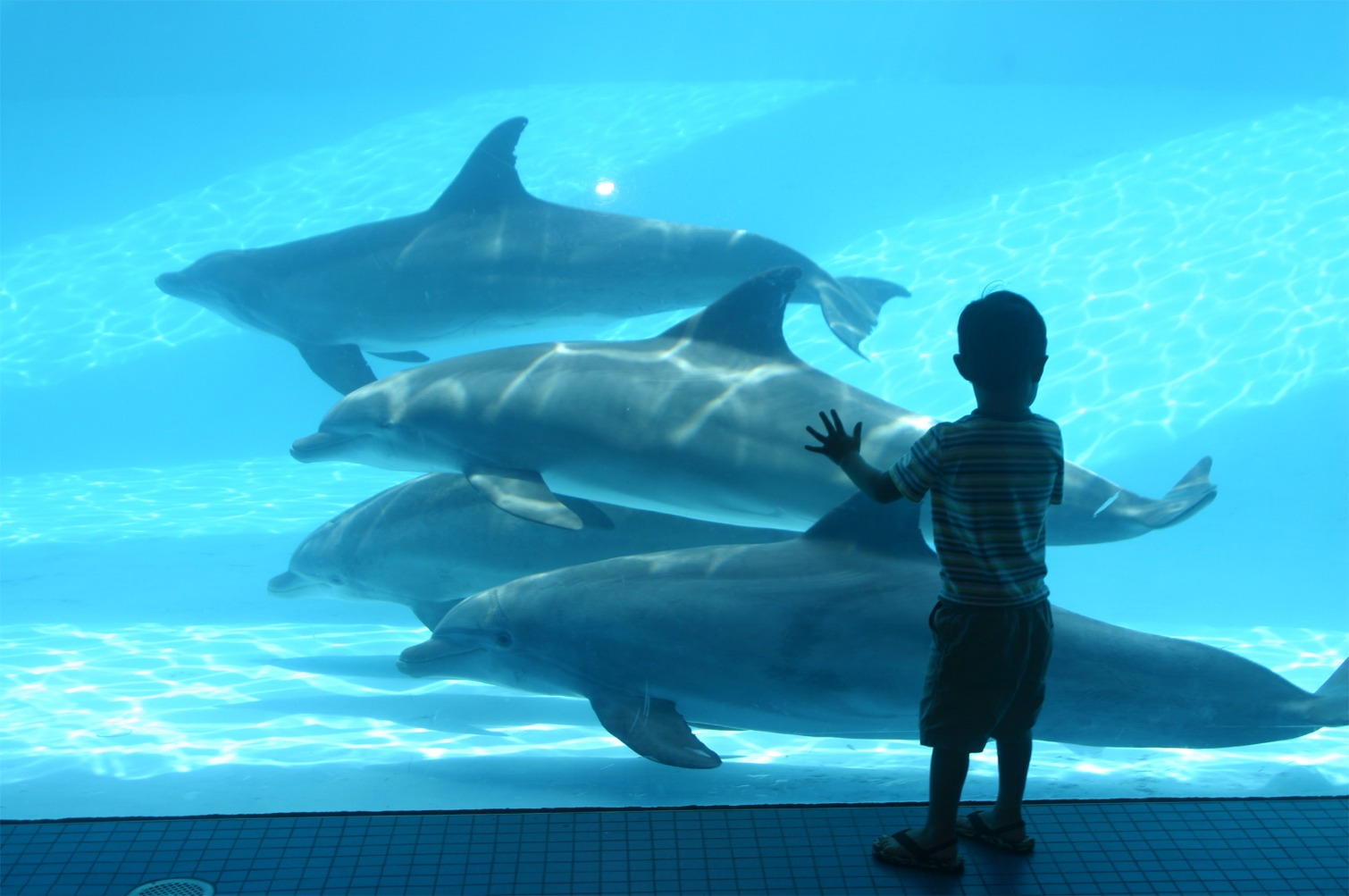
Dolphin Bay displays four bottlenose dolphins from above and below the water.

- Tentacles: This 800 gal(3,000 L) exhibit contains a variety of jellyfish and sea nettles, most of which can be found in the Gulf of Mexico.
- Flower Gardens: Replicating a coral reef, this 40,000 gal (150,000 L) exhibit features Atlantic tarpon, green moray eels, and cownose stingrays.
- Hawn Wild Flight Theater: These presentations feature a variety of trained birds and small mammals, as well as other animals, including parrots, hawks, owls, prehensile-tailed porcupines, African servals, and falcons. The Hawn Wild Flight Theater honors the Hawn family for their long-standing commitment to the aquarium's mission of wildlife education and conservation in South Texas. The theater was opened April 24, 2007.
- Islands of Steel: This area recreates the habitat formed around an oil platform. The 125,000 (470,000 L) exhibit includes nurse sharks, amberjack, Atlantic tarpon, grouper, a barracuda, and many other species that could be found in a naturally occurring habitat in the Gulf of Mexico. The exhibit formerly hosted an iconic sand tiger shark (Hans) but a mishap in 2015 led to the death of Hans as well as about 400 other fish.
- Living Shores: Visitors can interact with hermit crabs, lightning whelks, and pencil urchins that reside in several touch pools at this exhibit.
- Otter Creek: Three North American river otters reside at the aquarium and can be viewed interacting with one another and their trainers throughout the day.
- Saving Sharks: This interactive, informative exhibition is designed to bring awareness to a commonly misunderstood species.
- Stingray Lagoon: Visitors can touch Atlantic and cownose stingrays in the aquarium's largest outdoor touch pool.
- Swamp Tales: This exhibit houses two juvenile American alligators and several turtles. Bo, a 11-foot (3.4 m) American alligator, formerly resided in this exhibit, but died on September 25, 2020, after an infection in his back, left foot. He was estimated to be 25–50 years old and arrived at the aquarium in 1999.
- Tortuga Cay: Visitors can view the rehabilitated and unreleasable sea turtles above and below the water at this exhibit. Tortuga Cay includes three green sea turtles (Squirt, Pickles, and Crush), one Kemp's ridley sea turtle (Daisy), one hawksbill sea turtle (Hemingway), and a loggerhead sea turtle (Tiki).

== Programs ==
In addition to regular tours, the Texas State Aquarium offers many other educational programs.

- Aquarium discovery programs allow schools to bring their students to learn about the Gulf of Mexico environment.
- Aquavision (distance learning), for schools that are not able to tour the aquarium, uses web-based and video-conferencing technology to provide access to the animals and staff of the aquarium. Learning objectives are aligned with the Texas Education Knowledge and Skills.
- Overnight programs allow children to spend the night at the aquarium, where they can experience behind-the-scenes tours of the aquarium.
- Outreach programs allow staff members to come to schools and give presentations in the classroom.
- Spring break mini-camps are designed to promote STEM exploration and discovery. Activities include paddle boating and canoeing at the SeaLab facility.
- Summer SeaCamp is a weeklong camp also to promote STEM exploration and discovery. Activities include fishing, aquarium visits, field activities, chatting with an ocean scientist, tracking a shark, and an overnight stay at the aquarium.

== Gallery ==
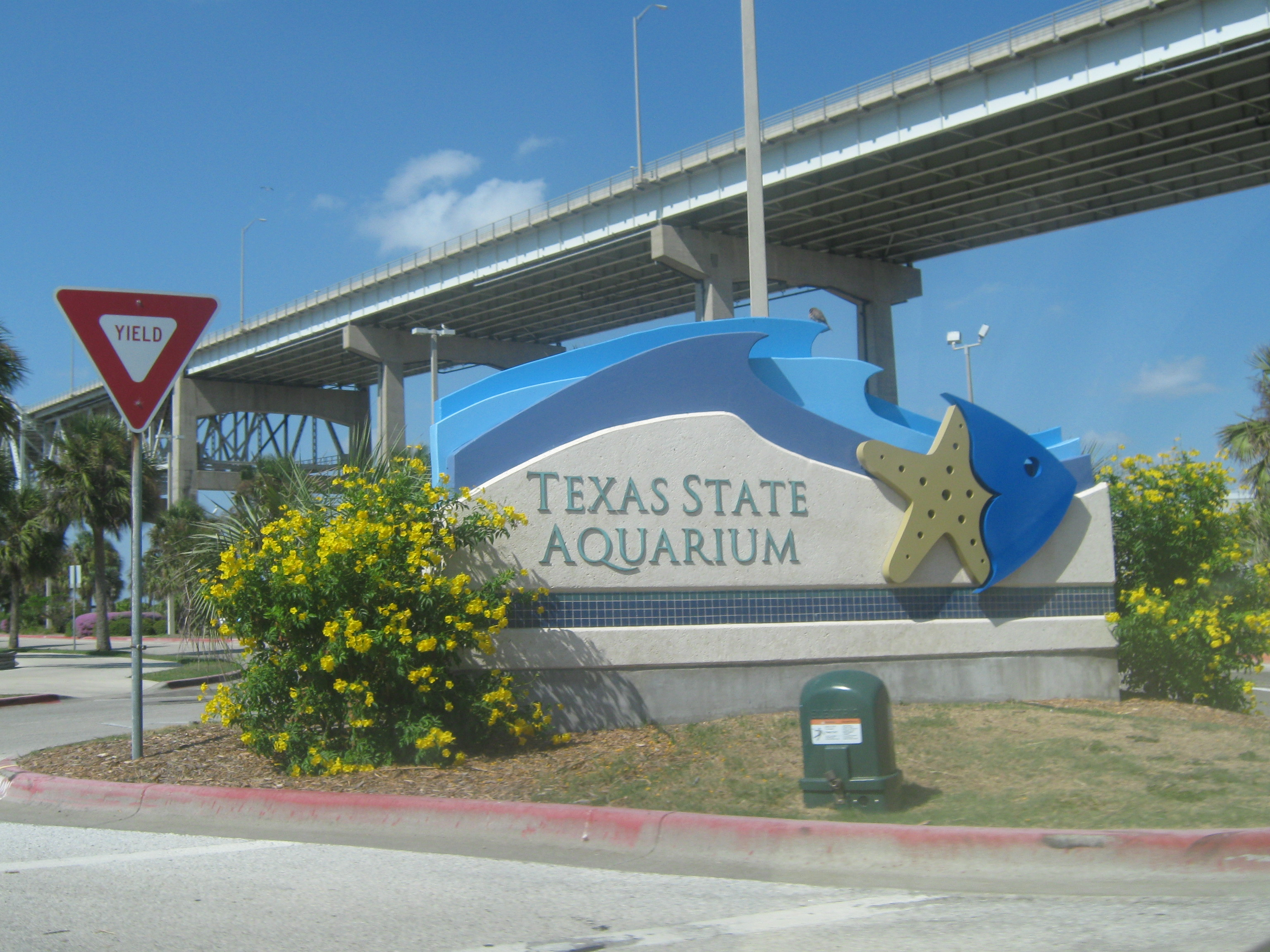
Entrance sign.

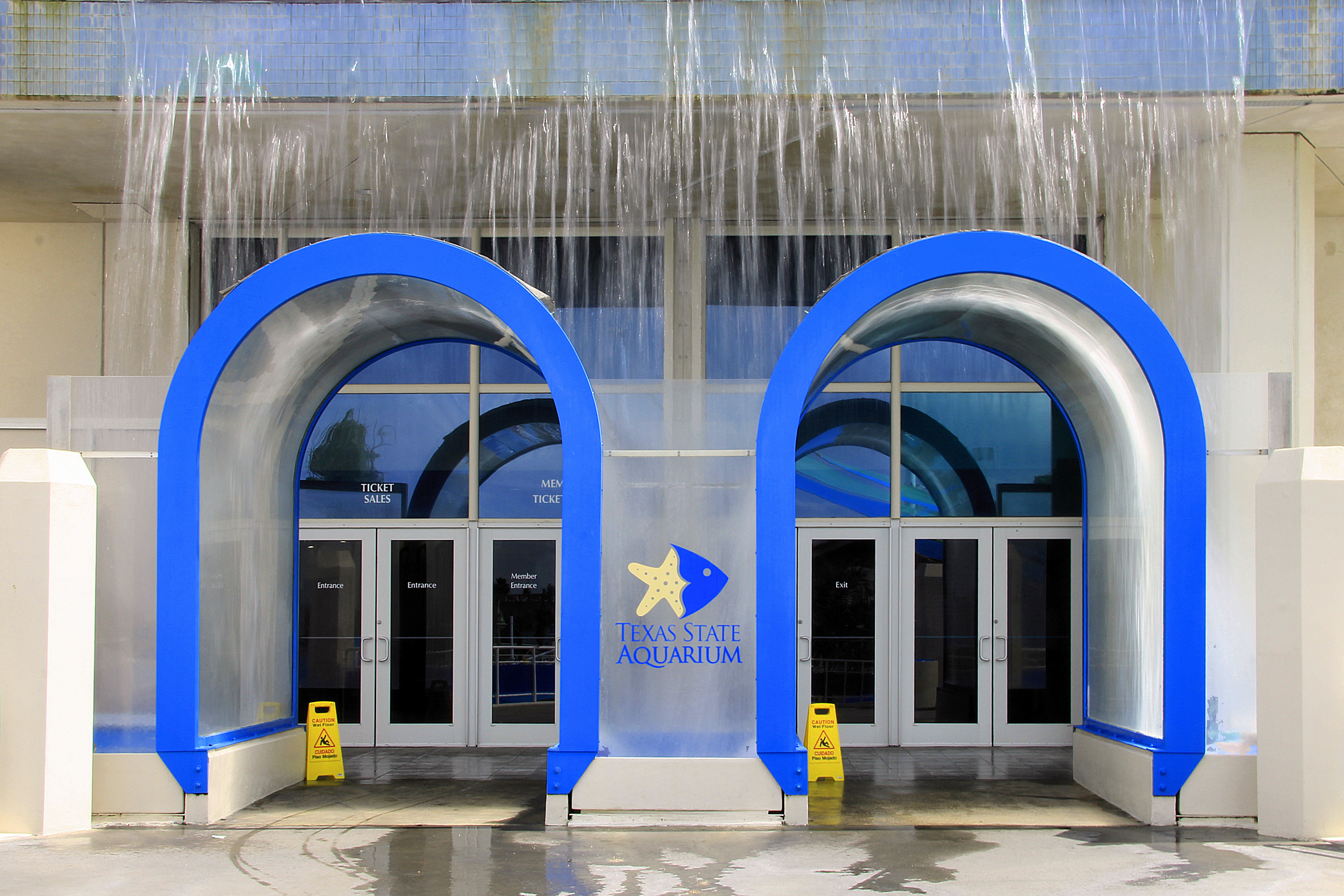
Waterfall over the entrance doors.

Turtle in one of the aquariums.

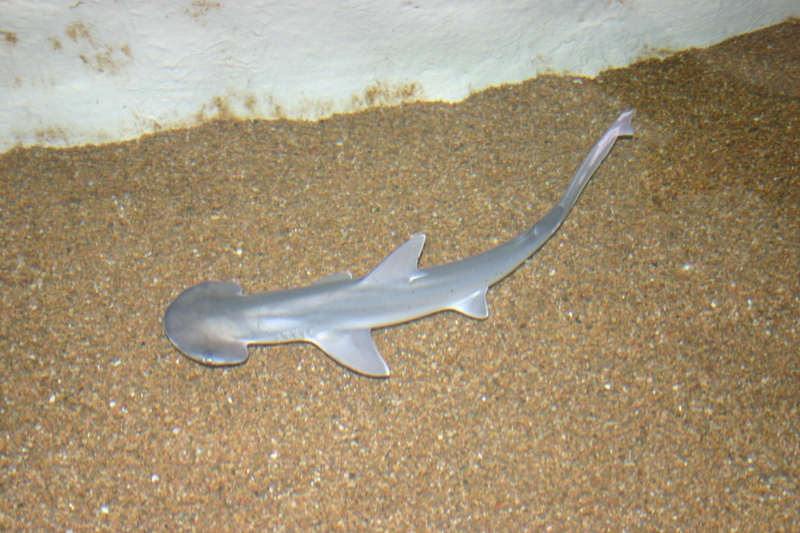
Bonnethead shark (Sphyrna tiburo).

American alligator (Alligator mississippiensis)

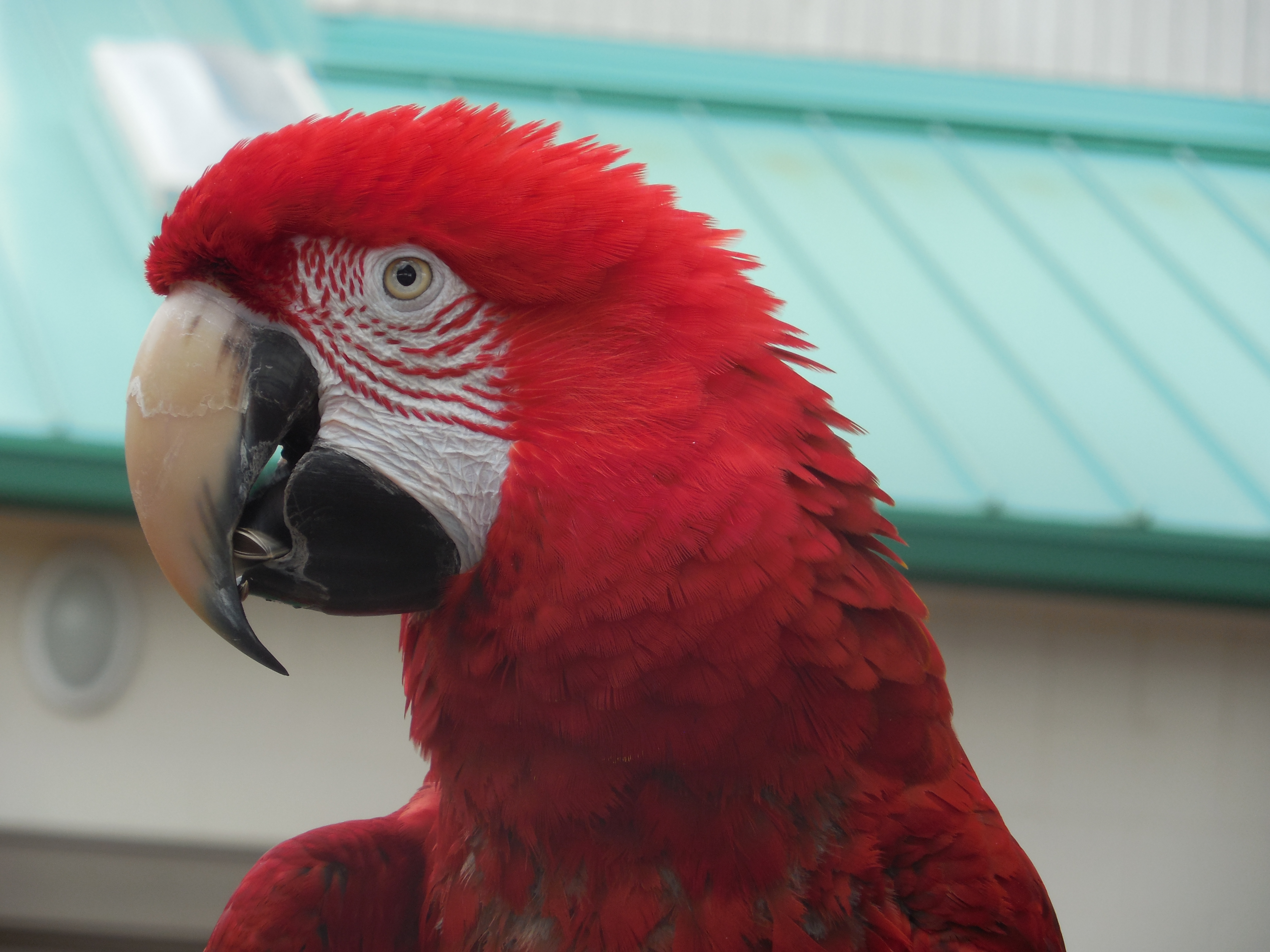
Red-and-green macaw (Ara chloropterus)

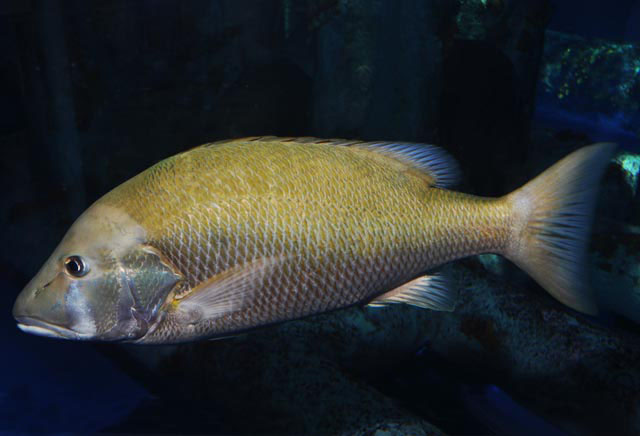
Dog snapper (Lutjanus jocu)

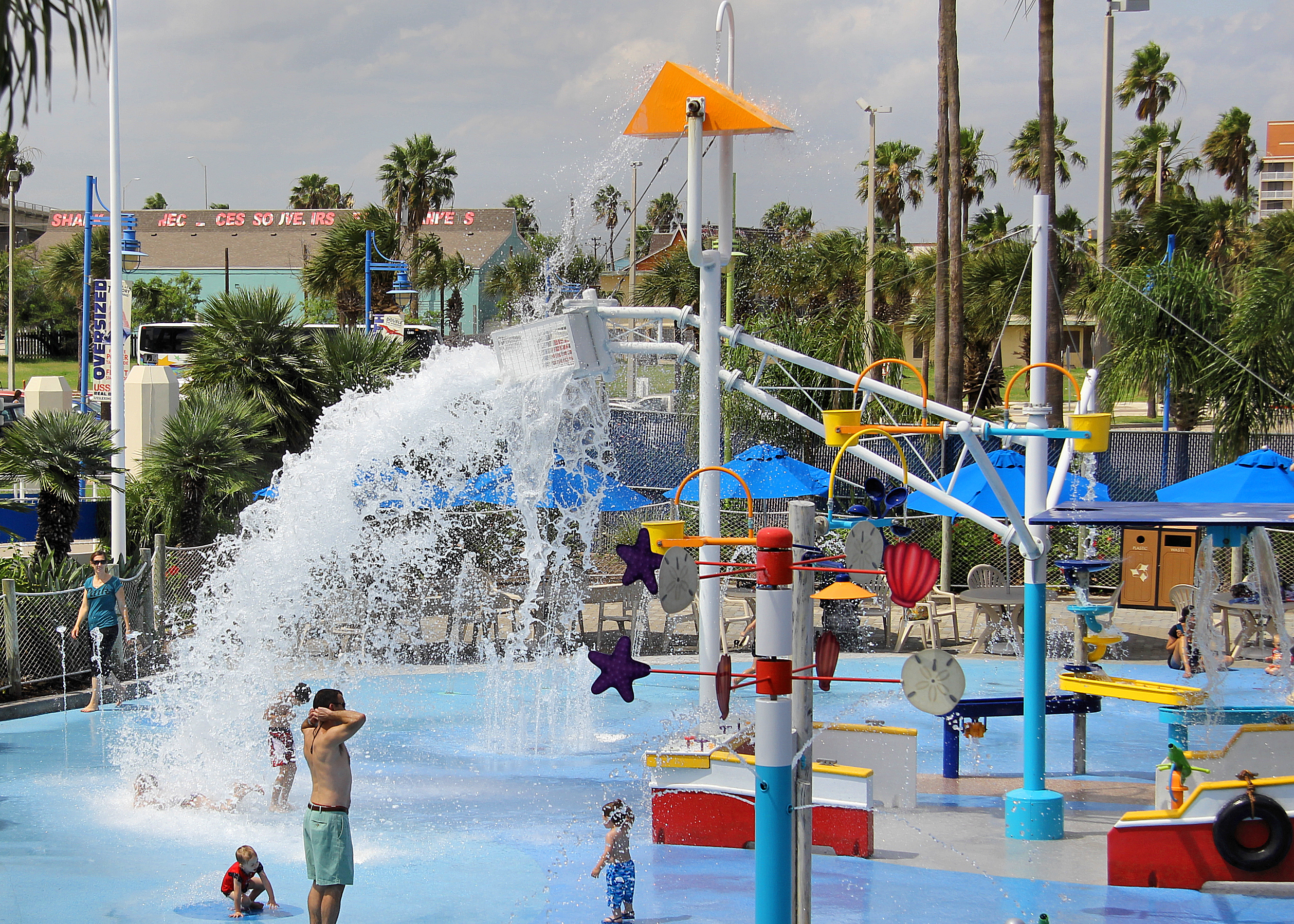
Splash park.

Video of a record number of cold-stunned sea turtles that were rescued by the aquarium.
