= Cold-stunning =

Hypothermic reaction in marine reptiles

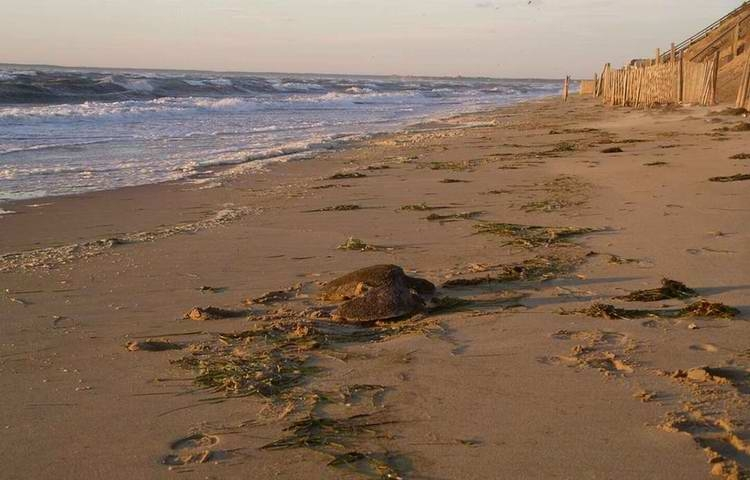
Two rescued cold-stunned turtles

Cold-stunning, also known as hypothermic stunning, is a hypothermic reaction experienced by marine reptiles, especially sea turtles, after prolonged exposure to cold water. Affected animals become weak and inactive. Cold-stunned sea turtles may float to the surface, where further exposure to cold temperatures can cause them to drown. Water temperatures of 8–10 °C have been associated with mass turtle-stunning events. Rescue is time-sensitive after cold-stunning occurs.

One study indicates that ocean warming has increased cold-stunning events affecting Kemp's ridley sea turtles in the northwest Atlantic.

== Notable instances ==
Video of the rescue efforts in 2021 by the Texas State Aquarium

In 2016, 1,700 turtles were cold-stunned in North Carolina after "an unusually temperate fall and early winter".

In 2021, nearly 5,000 cold-stunned turtles were rescued in Texas during a winter storm. It was described as the largest cold-stunning event documented in the state.

== See also ==
- Physiology of aquatic reptiles
