= List of mammals of the Mediterranean Sea =

The marine mammal species of the Mediterranean Sea includes 28 distinct species who have been observed, including 12 resident species: 11 cetaceans and one seal. In addition, it is common to find wandering individuals from other Atlantic species, such as the false killer whale, the Atlantic spotted dolphin, or the common minke whale, among others.

== Order: Carnivora ==
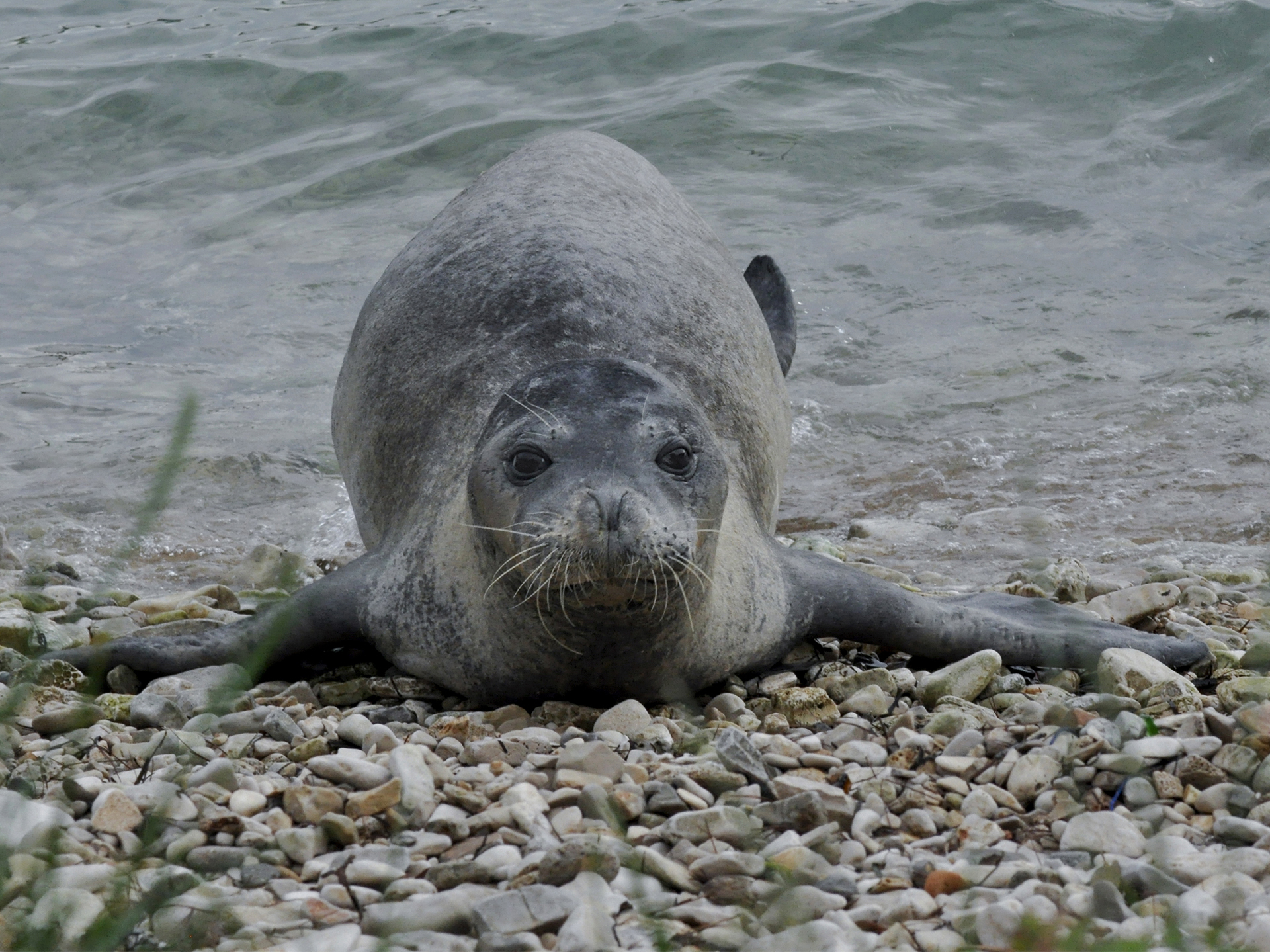
Mediterranean monk seal.

=== Family: Phocidae ===
- Genus: Monachus
  - Mediterranean monk seal, Monachus monachus EN

== Order: Artiodactyla ==
=== Infraorder: Cetacea ===
==== Family: Balaenopteridae ====
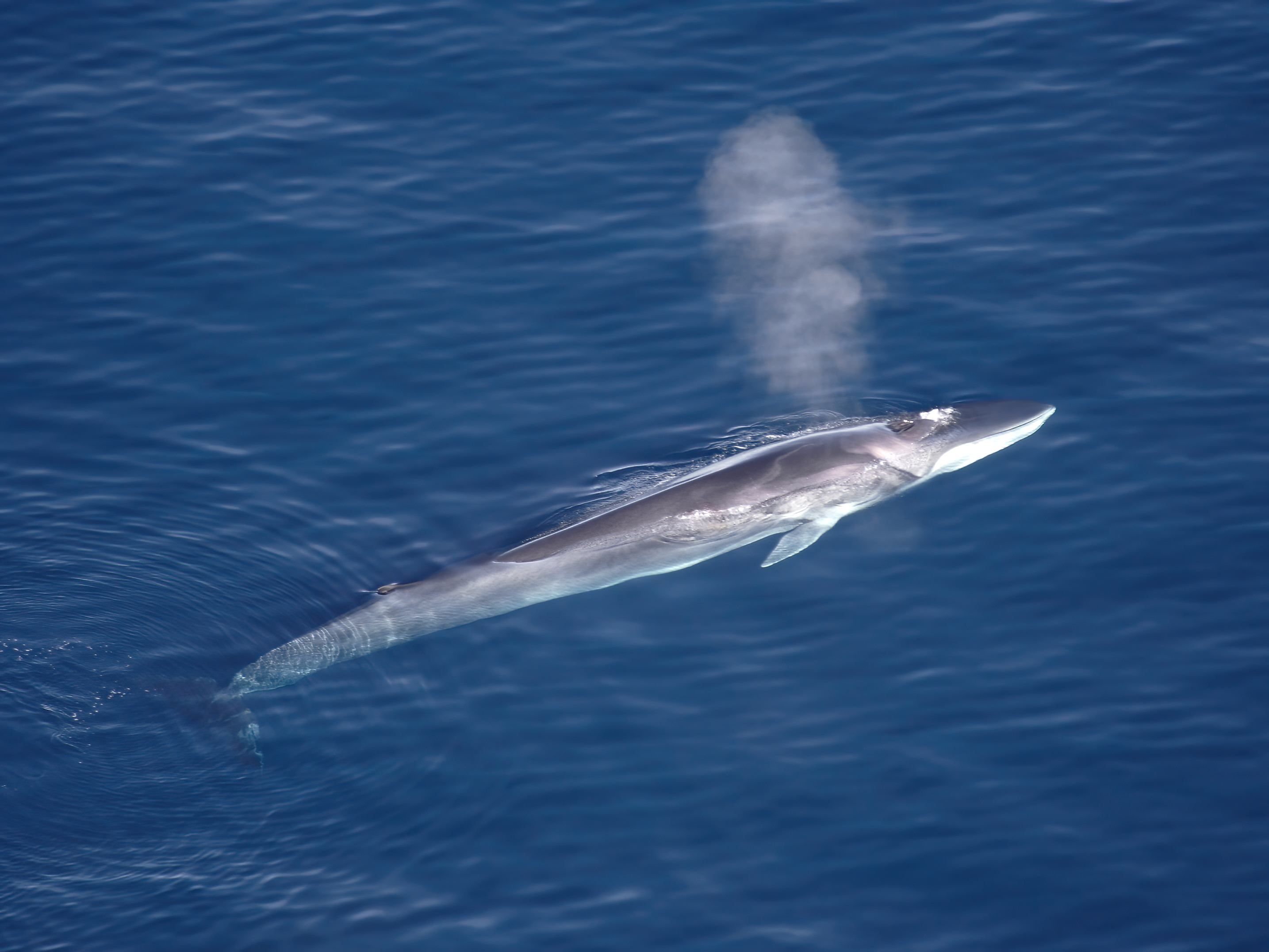
Fin whale.

- Genus: Balaenoptera
  - Fin whale, Balaenoptera physalus VU

==== Family: Delphinidae ====
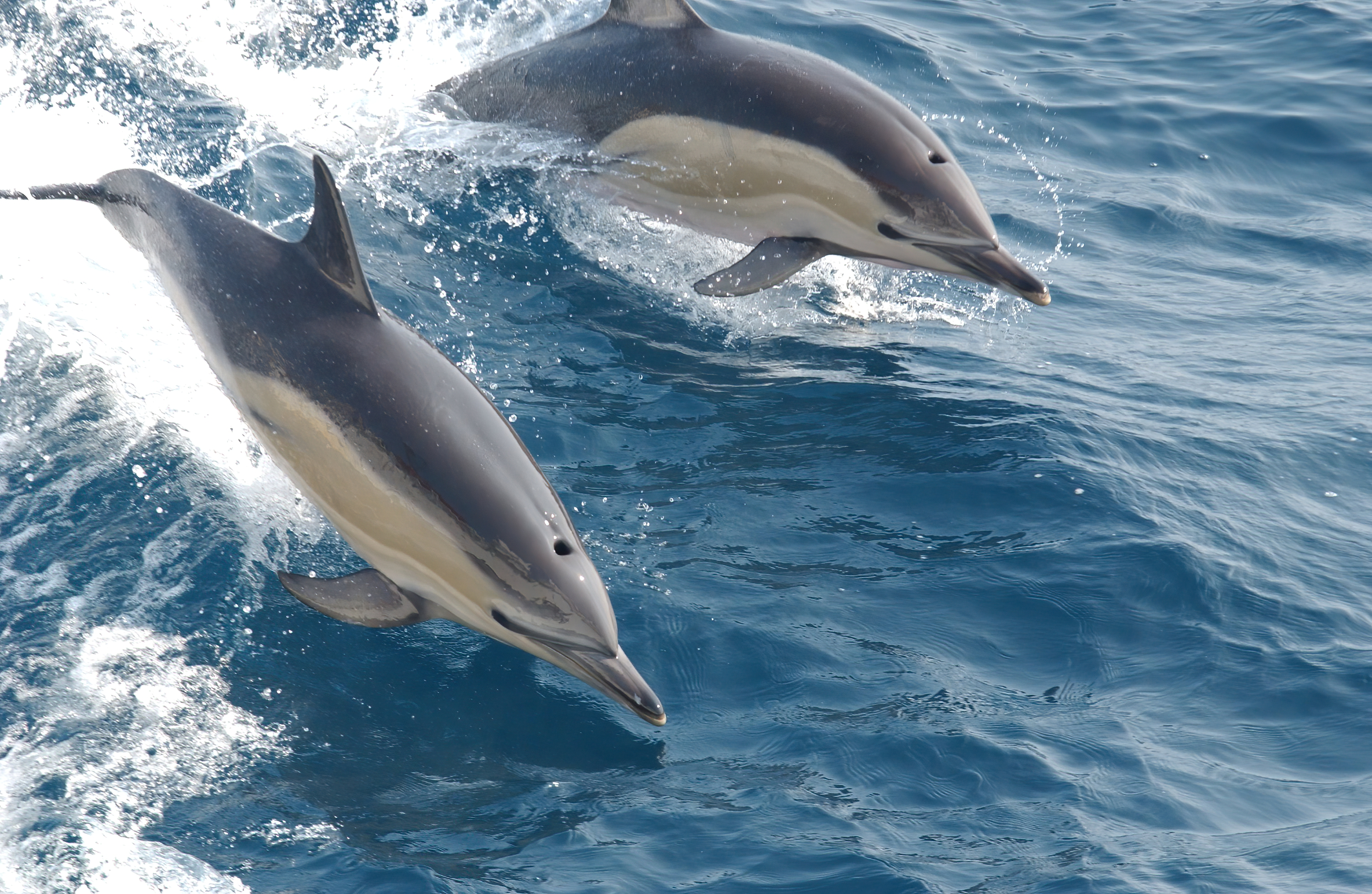
Common dolphin.

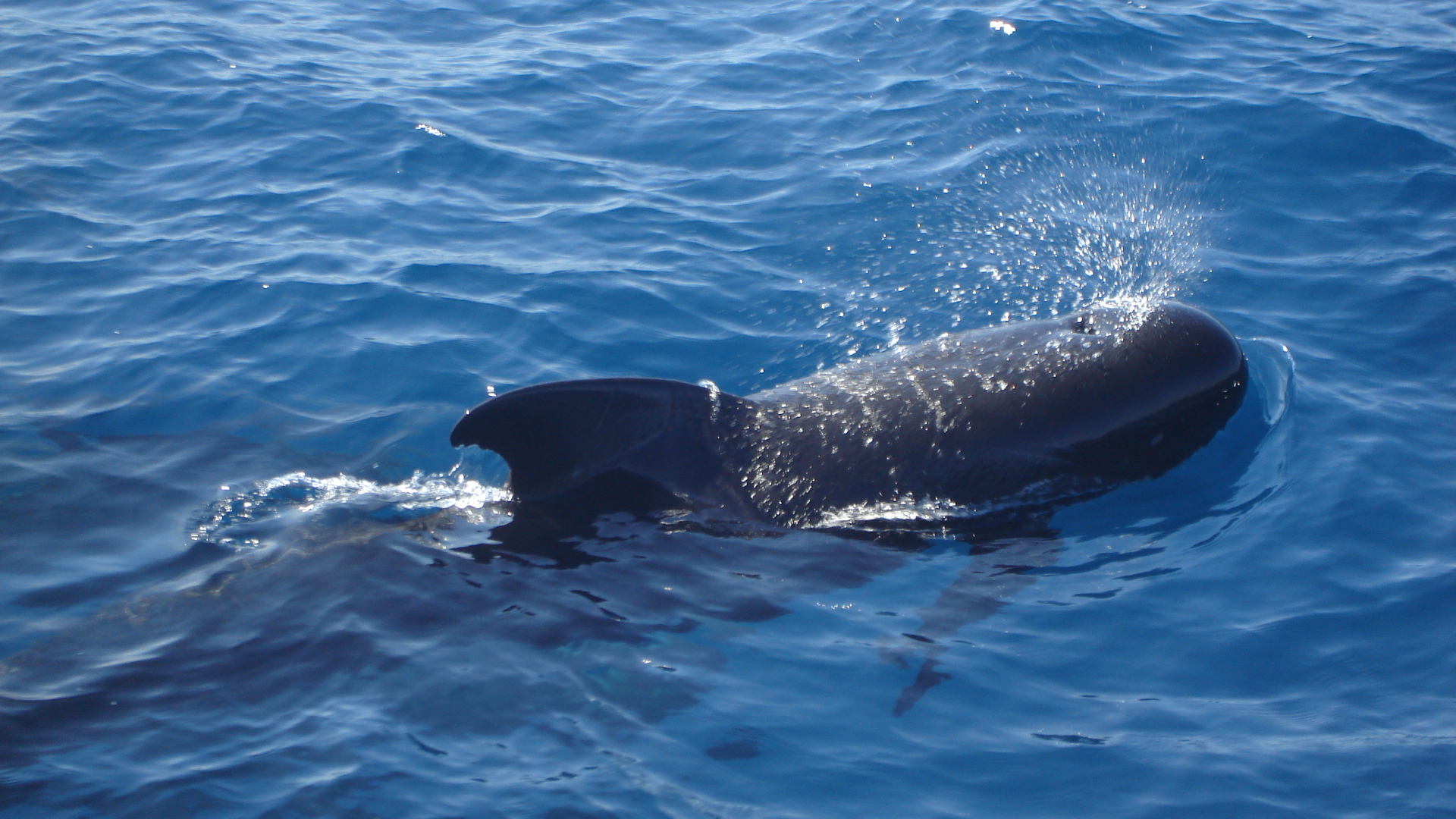
Long-finned pilot whale.

Orca.

- Genus: Delphinus
  - Common dolphin, Delphinus delphis LC
- Genus: Globicephala
  - Long-finned pilot whale, Globicephala melas LC
- Genus: Grampus
  - Risso's dolphin, Grampus griseus LC
- Genus: Orcinus
  - Orca, Orcinus orca DD
- Genus: Stenella
  - Striped dolphin, Stenella coeruleoalba LC
- Genus: Steno
  - Rough-toothed dolphin, Steno bredanensis LC
- Genus: Tursiops
  - Common bottlenose dolphin, Tursiops truncatus LC

==== Family: Phocoenidae ====
- Genus: Phocoena
  - Harbour porpoise, Phocoena phocoena LC

==== Family: Physeteridae ====
- Genus: Physeter
- Sperm whale, Physeter macrocephalus LC

==== Family: Ziphidae ====
- Genus: Ziphius
  - Cuvier's beaked whale, Ziphius cavirostris LC

== See also ==
- List of reptiles of the Mediterranean Sea
- List of fishes of the Mediterranean Sea
