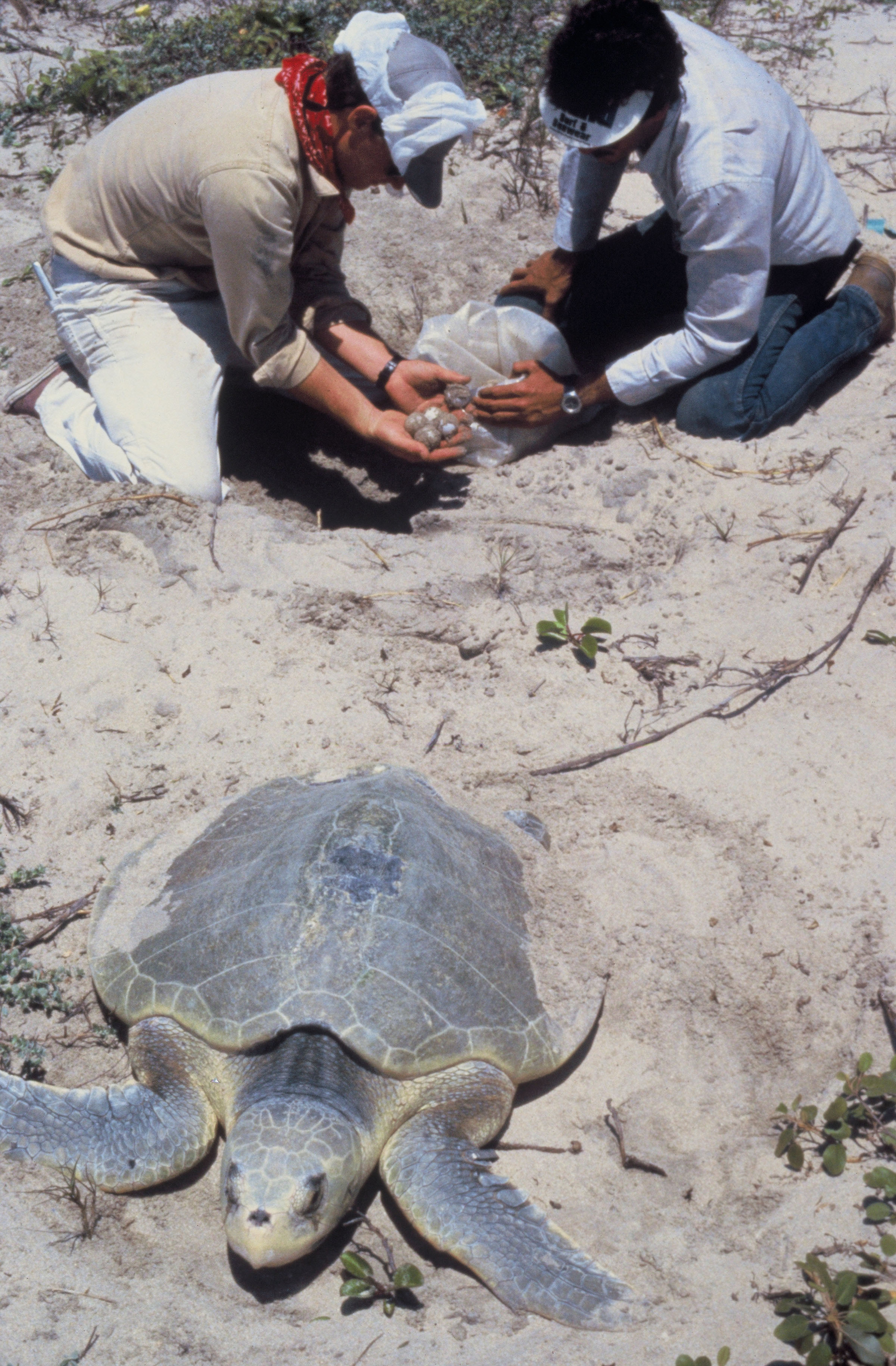
- Researchers collect Kemp's ridley sea turtle eggs

Scientific classification
- Kingdom: Animalia
- Phylum: Chordata
- Class: Reptilia
- Order: Testudines
- Suborder: Cryptodira
- Family: Cheloniidae
- Subfamily: Carettinae
- Genus: Lepidochelys; Fitzinger, 1843

Type species
- Chelonia olivacea Eschscholtz, 1829

Species
- Lepidochelys kempii Lepidochelys olivacea

= Ridley sea turtle =

Genus of turtles

Ridley sea turtles are a genus (Lepidochelys) of sea turtle comprising two species: Kemp's ridley sea turtle and the olive ridley sea turtle.

Kemp's ridley sea turtles are currently on the New York and United States lists of endangered species.

== Anatomy ==
Adult ridley sea turtles grow to a length of 51–71 cm (20–28 in), and weight of 36–50 kg (79–110 lb). They feed on crabs, fish, cephalopods, clams, and some marine vegetation.

== Etymology and taxonomic history ==
The origin of "ridley" is a subject of speculation. Prior to being known as ridleys, French naturalist Bernard Germain de Lacépède referred to the Lepidochelys species as "bastard turtles." Renowned sea turtle conservationist Archie Carr claimed that "ridley" was a common Floridan term, quite possibly, a dialectal corruption of "riddle."

== Conservation ==
The Kemp's ridley sea turtles were on the brink of extinction in the 1960s with low numbers of 200 nesting individuals. Due to strict laws that protected their nesting sites in Mexico and altered fishing gear to avoid accidental capture of the Kemp's ridley, their numbers have increased to estimated an 7000–9000 nesting individuals today. The olive ridley sea turtle is considered to have the most abundant numbers today, estimated as 800,000 nesting individuals. The threats to their survival are loss of nesting habitat, direct harvest of the eggs and adults, and entanglement in fishing gear. Laws against harvesting the adults and eggs also have helped the olive ridley sea turtles' numbers gradually increase.

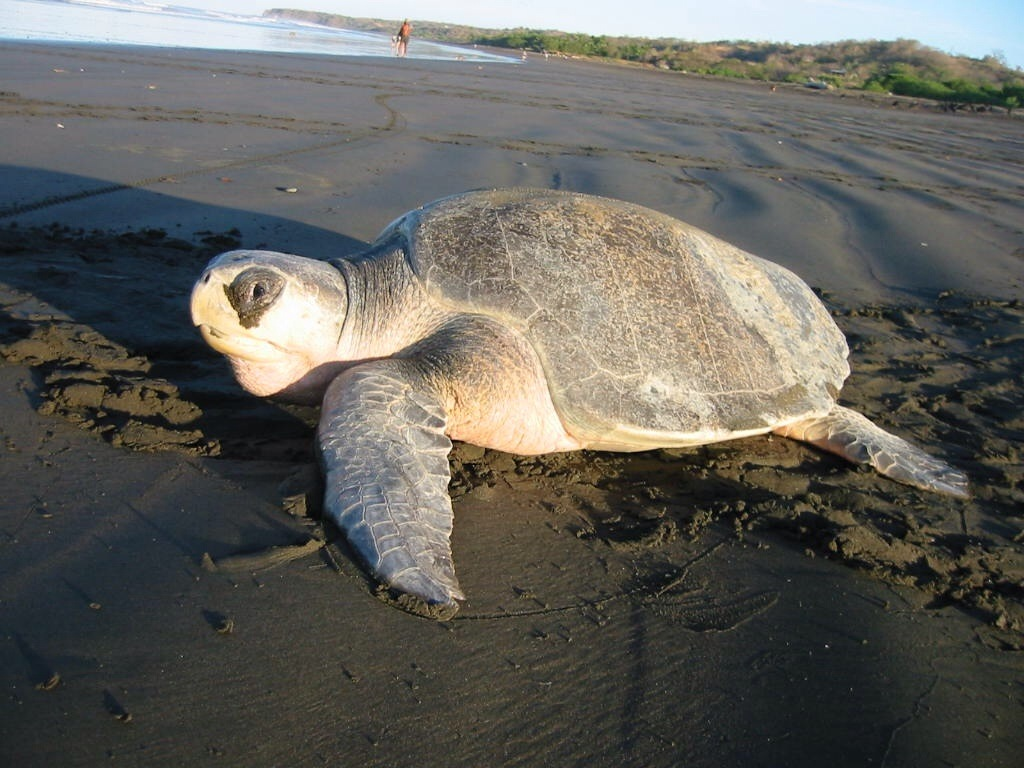
Female after laying eggs
