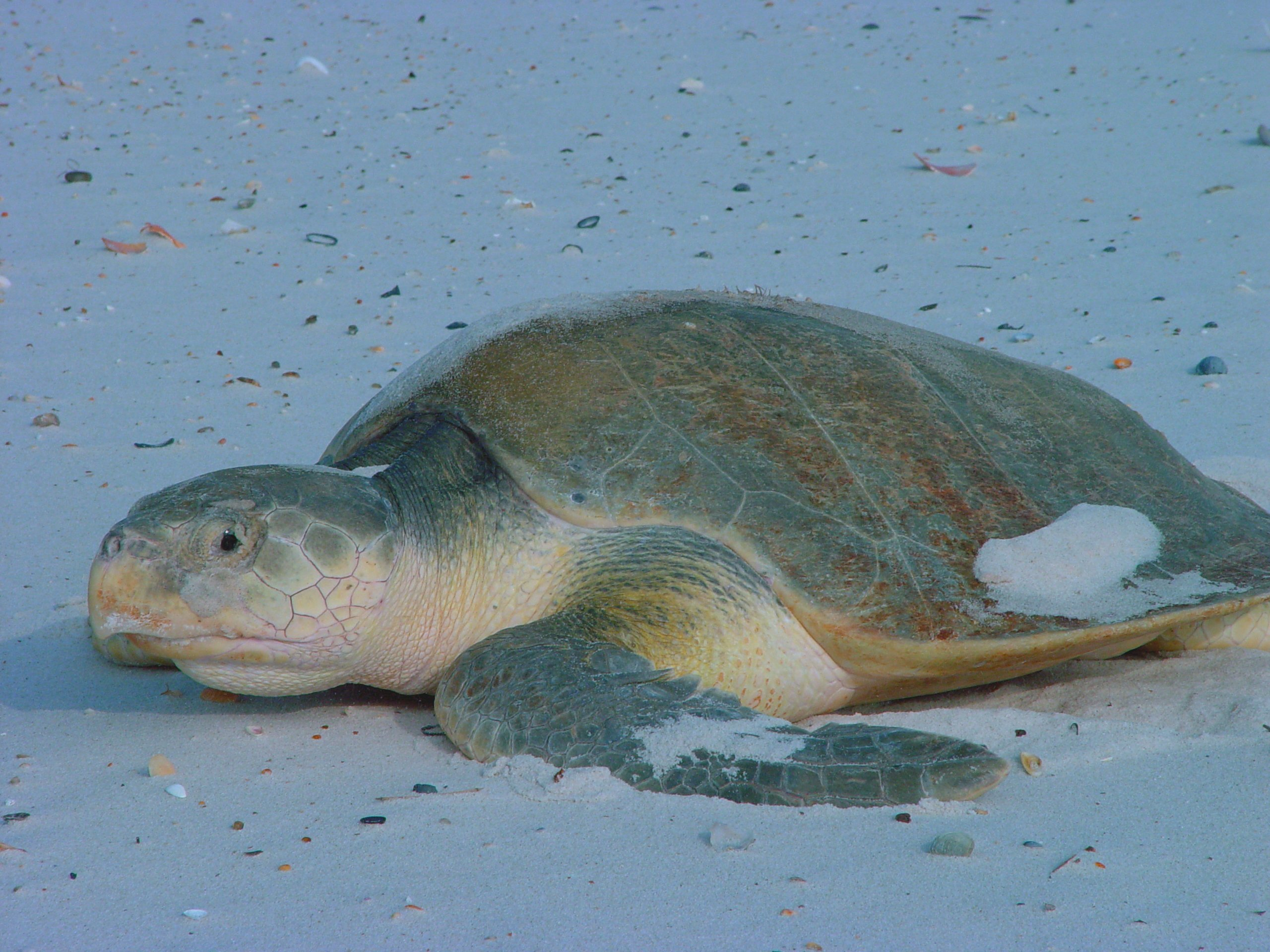
- Lepidochelys kempii

Conservation status
- Critically Endangered (IUCN 3.1)
- CITES Appendix I

Scientific classification
- Kingdom: Animalia
- Phylum: Chordata
- Class: Reptilia
- Order: Testudines
- Suborder: Cryptodira
- Family: Cheloniidae
- Genus: Lepidochelys
- Species: L. kempii

Binomial name
- Lepidochelys kempii (Garman, 1880)

Synonyms
- List: Thalassochelys kempii Garman, 1880; Lepidochelys kempii — Baur, 1890; Colpochelys kempii — O.P. Hay, 1905; Caretta kempii — Siebenrock, 1909; Lepidochelys olivacea kempii — Mertens & Wermuth, 1955; Lepidochelys kempii — Fritz & Havaš, 2007

= Kemp's ridley sea turtle =

Species of sea turtle

Computed tomography–based model of a Lepidochelys kempii skull, with selected muscles highlighted

Kemp's ridley sea turtle (Lepidochelys kempii), also called commonly the Atlantic ridley sea turtle, Kemp's ridley turtle, and Kemp's ridley, is a species of turtle in the family Cheloniidae. L. kempii is the rarest species of sea turtle and is the world's most endangered species of sea turtle as well as the smallest. It is one of two living species in the genus Lepidochelys (the other one being L. olivacea, the olive ridley sea turtle). L. kempii primarily occupies habitat around the Gulf of Mexico, though its migrations into the Atlantic Ocean are being affected by rising temperatures. Rising sea temperatures expand this species' range, leaving them vulnerable to cold-shocking events when weather changes. Kemp's ridley sea turtle is listed as endangered under the Endangered Species Act (ESA), and conservation efforts are attempting to rebuild population numbers. Human activity, including habitat destruction, climate change, and oil spills, threatens populations.

== Taxonomy ==
This species of turtle is called Kemp's ridley because Richard Moore Kemp (1825–1908) of Key West was the first to send a specimen to Samuel Garman at Harvard, but the origin of the name "ridley" itself is unknown. Prior to the term being popularly used (for both species in the genus), L. kempii at least was known as the "bastard turtle".

At least one source also refers to Kemp's ridley as a "heartbreak turtle". In her book The Great Ridley Rescue, Pamela Philips claimed the name was coined by fishermen who witnessed the turtles dying after being "turned turtle" (on their backs). The fishermen said the turtles "died of a broken heart".

== Description ==
Kemp's ridley is the smallest of all sea turtle species, with a carapace length of 58–70 cm (23–28 in) and weight of only 36–45 kg (80–100 lb) at maturity. Typical of sea turtles, it has a dorsoventrally depressed body with specially adapted flipper-like front limbs and a beak. Kemp's ridley turtle adults reach a maximum of 75 cm (30 in) in carapace length and weigh a maximum of 50 kg (110 lb). The adult's oval carapace is almost as wide as it is long and is usually olive-gray in color. The carapace has five pairs of costal scutes. In each bridge adjoining the plastron to the carapace are four inframarginal scutes, each of which is perforated by a pore. The head has two pairs of prefrontal scales.

These turtles change color as they mature. As hatchlings, they are almost entirely a dark purple on both sides, but mature adults have a yellow-green or white plastron and a grey-green carapace.

Kemp's ridley has a triangular-shaped head with a somewhat hooked beak with large crushing surfaces. The skull is similar to that of the olive ridley. Unlike other sea turtles, the surface on the squamosal bone where the jaw opening muscles originate faces to the side rather than to the back.

They are the only sea turtles that nest during the day.

== Distribution ==
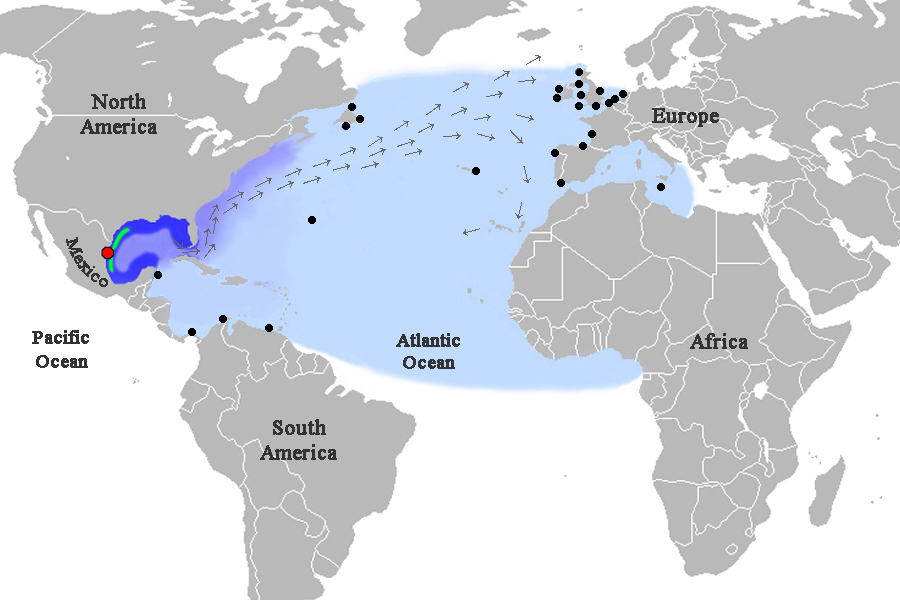
Distribution of Kemp's ridley sea turtle: red dot = primary nesting beach; green= adult male range; dark blue = adult female range; mid-blue = juvenile and subadult range; arrows = Gulf Stream; light blue = accidentals and vagrants (95% juveniles and subadults), black dots = verified records

The distribution of L. kempii is somewhat unusual compared to most reptiles, varying significantly among adults and juveniles, as well as males and females. Adults primarily live in the Gulf of Mexico, where they forage in the relatively shallow waters of the continental shelf (up to 409 m deep, but typically 50 m or less), with females ranging from the southern coast of the Florida Peninsula to the northern coast of the Yucatán Peninsula, while males have a tendency to remain closer to the nesting beaches in the Western Gulf waters of Texas (US), Tamaulipas, and Veracruz (Mexico). Adults of L. kempii are rarely found outside of the Gulf of Mexico and only 2–4% from the Atlantic are adults.

Head closeup

Juveniles and subadults, in contrast, regularly migrate into the Atlantic Ocean and occupy the coastal waters of the continental shelf of North America from southern Florida to Cape Cod, Massachusetts, and occasionally northward. The time periods of these migrations appear to be growing longer due to rising sea temperatures. Accidental and vagrant records are known with some regularity from throughout the northern Atlantic Ocean and Mediterranean Sea, where the Gulf Stream is believed to play a significant role in their dispersal. Confirmed records from Newfoundland to Venezuela in the west; to Ireland, the Netherlands, Malta in the Mediterranean, and numerous localities in between are known in the east. However, more than 95% of these involve juveniles or subadults. Several reports from the African coast from Morocco to Cameroon involve unverified specimens and may include misidentified olive ridley sea turtle (L. olivacea).

In November 2021, a male was found alive on Talacre beach in North Wales. The turtle was taken to the Anglesey Sea Zoo for treatment, with the intent of eventual transportation back to the Gulf of Mexico.

== Feeding and life history ==
=== Feeding ===
Kemp's ridley turtle feeds on mollusks, crustaceans (such as floating crabs and shrimp), jellyfish, fish, algae or seaweed, and sea urchins. Juveniles primarily are pelagic surface-feeders, while adults are opportunistic bottom-feeders that feed primarily on crabs. Research has shown that dives made by these turtles, including those made to forage, may be longer at night. Comparing dietary habits of head-started turtles (turtles raised in captivity before release) and wild turtles found little difference in variance in feeding habits, but variability exists in feeding habits due to habitat differences and maturation of the turtles. Variation in habitat region, as well as prey availability, was found to alter diet composition. Regional diet compositions aid in conservation efforts through enabling predicting food sources becoming affected by major events.

=== Life history ===
Most females return each year to a single beach—Rancho Nuevo in the Mexican state of Tamaulipas—to lay eggs. The females arrive in large groups of hundreds or thousands in nesting aggregations called arribadas, which is a Spanish word for "arrivals". Males will typically stay closer to breeding grounds.

Juvenile turtles tend to live in floating sargassum seaweed beds for their first years. Then, they range between northwest Atlantic waters and the Gulf of Mexico while growing into maturity.

They reach sexual maturity at the age of 10–12.

This is the only species that nests primarily during the day. The nesting season for these turtles is April to August. They nest mostly (95%) on a 16-mile beach in the Mexican state of Tamaulipas and on Padre Island in the US state of Texas, and elsewhere on the Gulf Coast. They mate offshore. Gravid females land in groups on beaches in arribadas or mass nesting. They prefer areas with dunes, or secondarily, swamps. The estimated number of nesting females in 1947 was 89,000, but shrank to an estimated 7,702 by 1985. Females nest one to four times during a season, keeping 10 to 20 days between nestings. Incubation takes 6–8 weeks. Around 100 eggs are in a clutch. The hatchlings' sex is decided by the temperature in the area during incubation. If the temperature is below 29.5 °C (85.1 °F), the offspring will be mainly male.

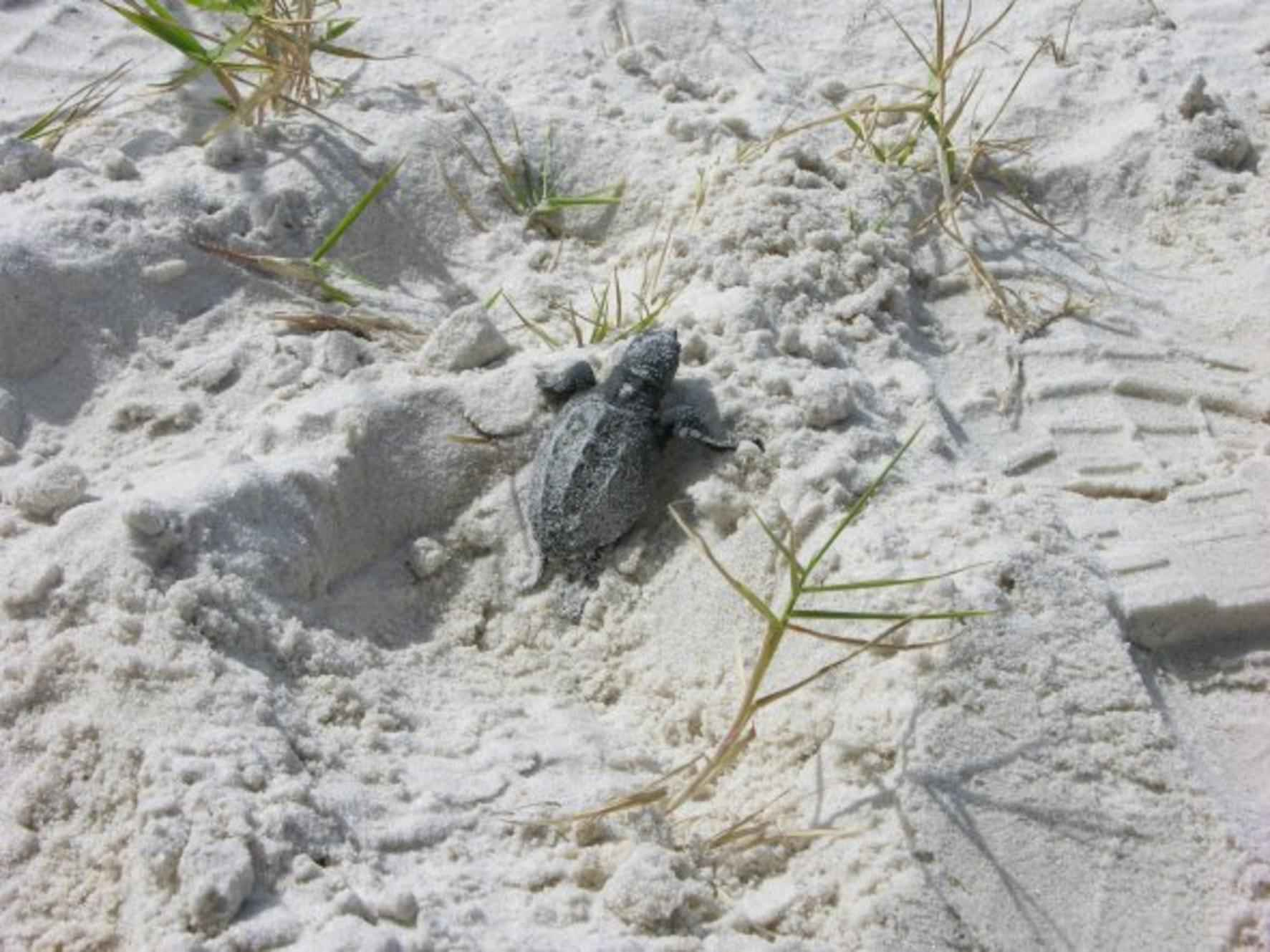
Hatchling

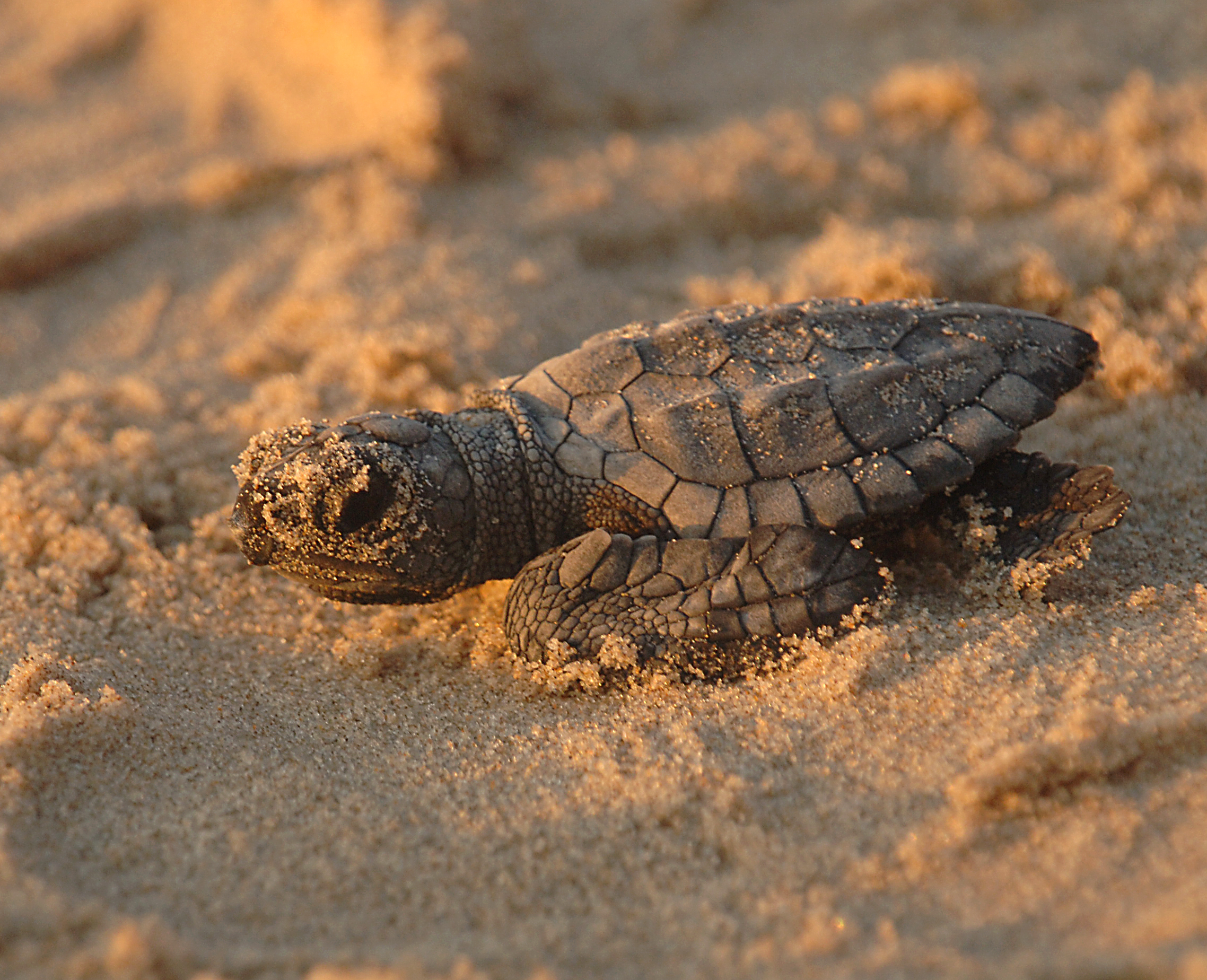
Hatchling

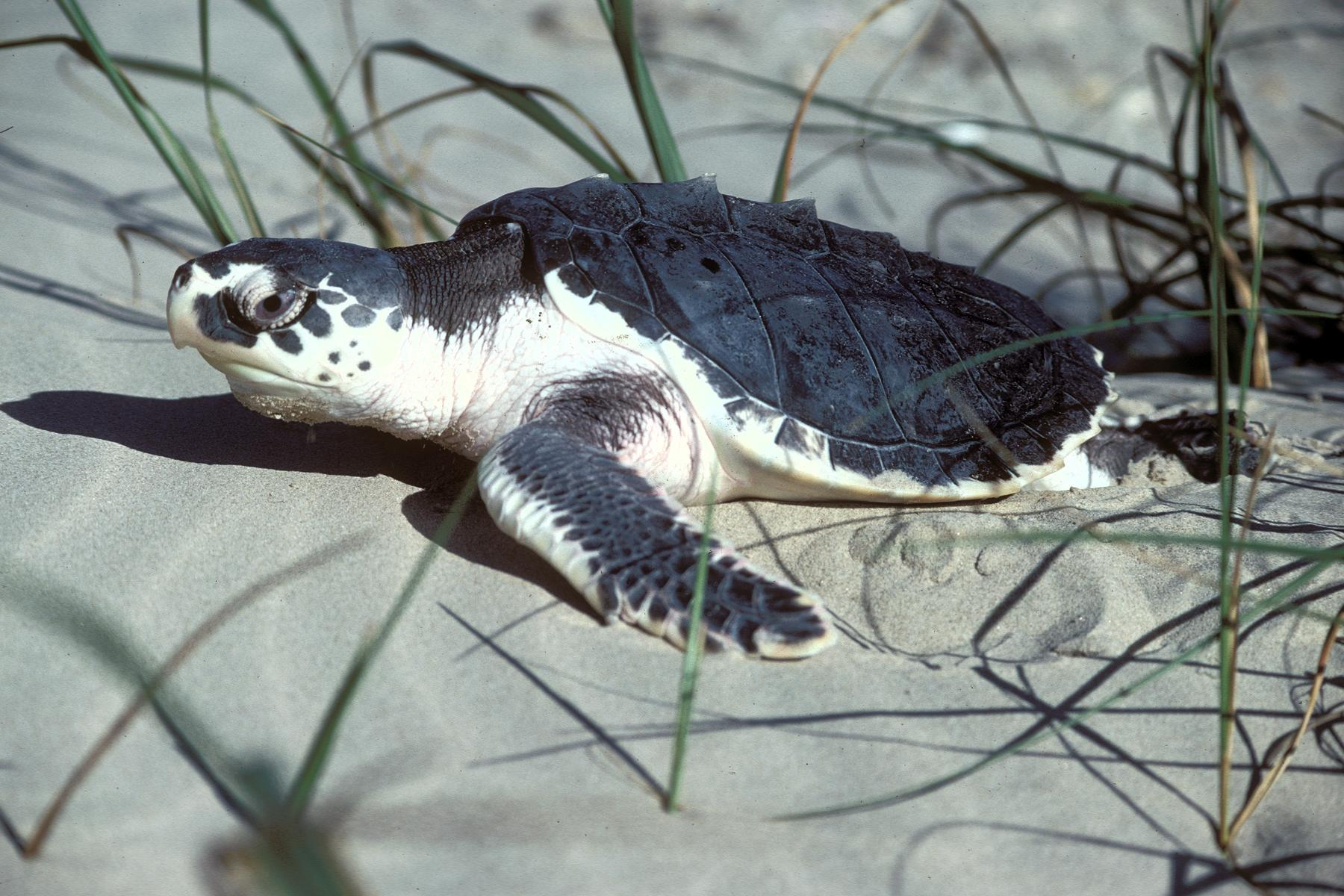
Juvenile turtle

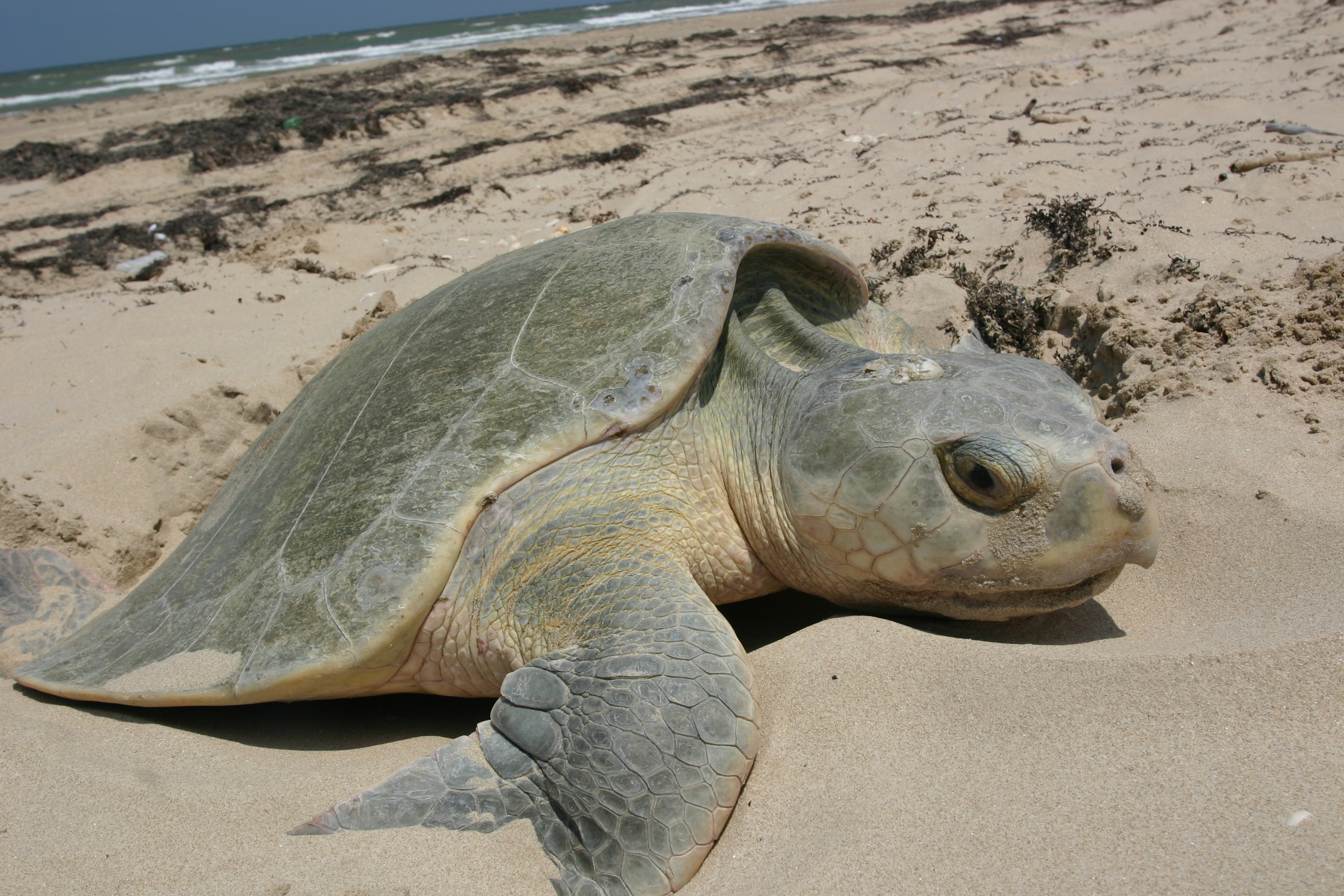
Adult turtle nesting

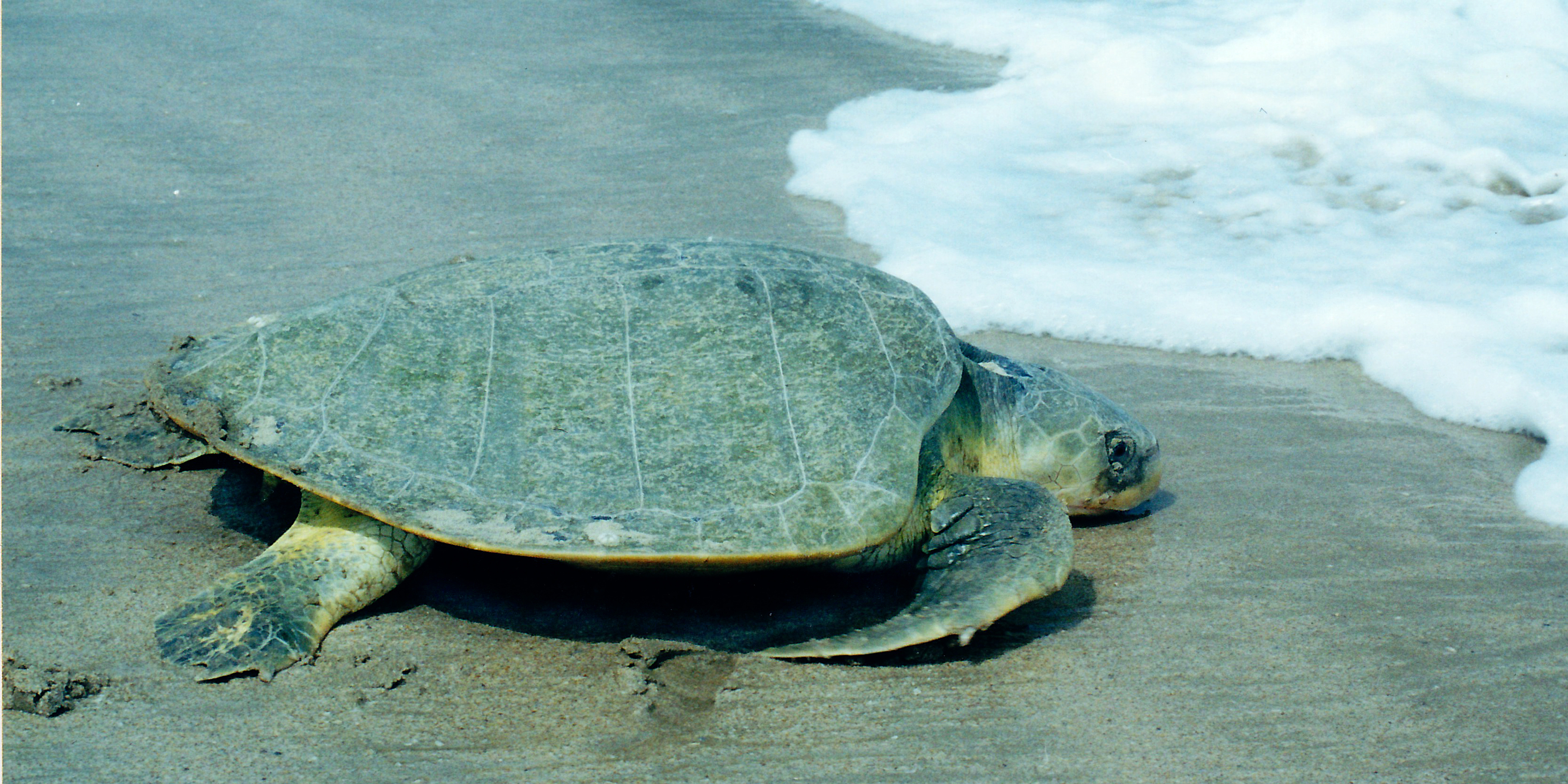
Nesting female returning to sea

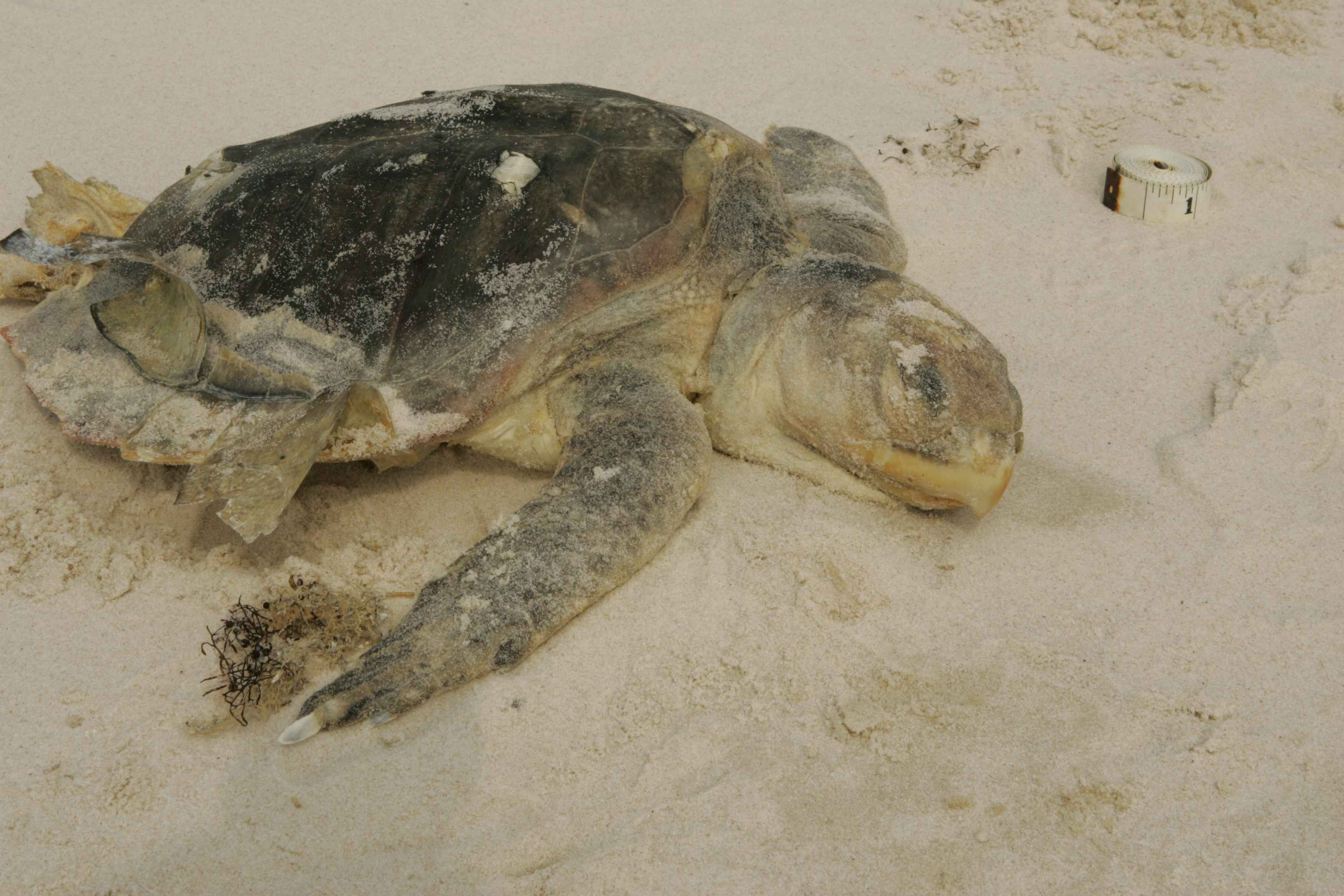
Deceased adult

== Conservation ==
Biologists collecting Kemp's ridley sea turtle's eggs to transport them to the Kennedy Space Center for hatching

Kemp's ridley sea turtle is currently listed as endangered under the Endangered Species Act (ESA). Egg harvesting and poaching first depleted the numbers of Kemp's ridley sea turtles. Still, today, major threats include habitat loss, pollution, and entanglement in shrimping nets. Some major current conservation efforts are aimed towards habitat protection, reduction of bycatch, rescue and rehabilitation, and reduction of killing.

Efforts to protect L. kempii began in 1966, when Mexico's Instituto Nacional de Investigaciones Biológico-Pesqueras (National Institute of Biological-Fisheries Research) sent biologists Hunberto Chávez, Martin Contreras, and Eduardo Hernández to the coast of southern Tamaulipas to survey and instigate conservation plans. And in the United States, Kemp's ridley turtle was first listed under the Endangered Species Conservation Act of 1970 on December 2, 1970, and subsequently under the Endangered Species Act of 1973. In 1977, an informal, binational multiagency group, the Kemp's Ridley Working Group, first met to develop a recovery plan. A binational recovery plan was developed in 1984, and revised in 1992. A draft public review of the second revision was published by National Marine Fisheries Service in March 2010. This revision includes an updated threat assessment.

From 1947 to 1985, L. kempii nests experienced a sharp decline from an estimated 121,517 nests in 1947 to 702 nests in 1985 (decline of 99.4%), and have since been exponentially recovering until approximately 2011–2016, when another decline in nests occurred. Nesting as of 2016 is estimated to be 9.9% of the nest estimate of 1947.

One mechanism used to protect turtles from fishing nets is the turtle excluder device (TED). It is a grid of bars with an opening at the top or bottom, fitted into the neck of the shrimp trawl. It works by allowing small animals to slip through bars and get caught, while sea turtles strike the bars and are ejected through an escape hole on either the top or bottom of the device. These mechanism designs are controlled through federal regulations to ensure proper use. There are multiple types of TED construction: oval grid, hooped, fixed angle, Super Shooter, Anthony Weedless, and flounder types. Each design is adapted to be best suited for certain conditions/uses or varies by complexity of the design.

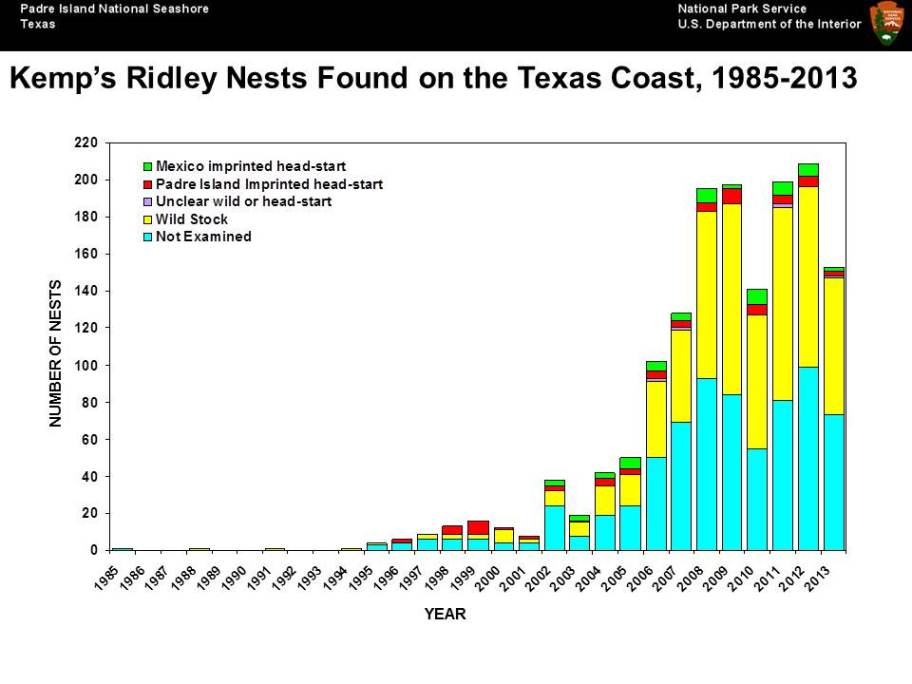
Kemp's ridley nests found on the Texas coast 1985–2013

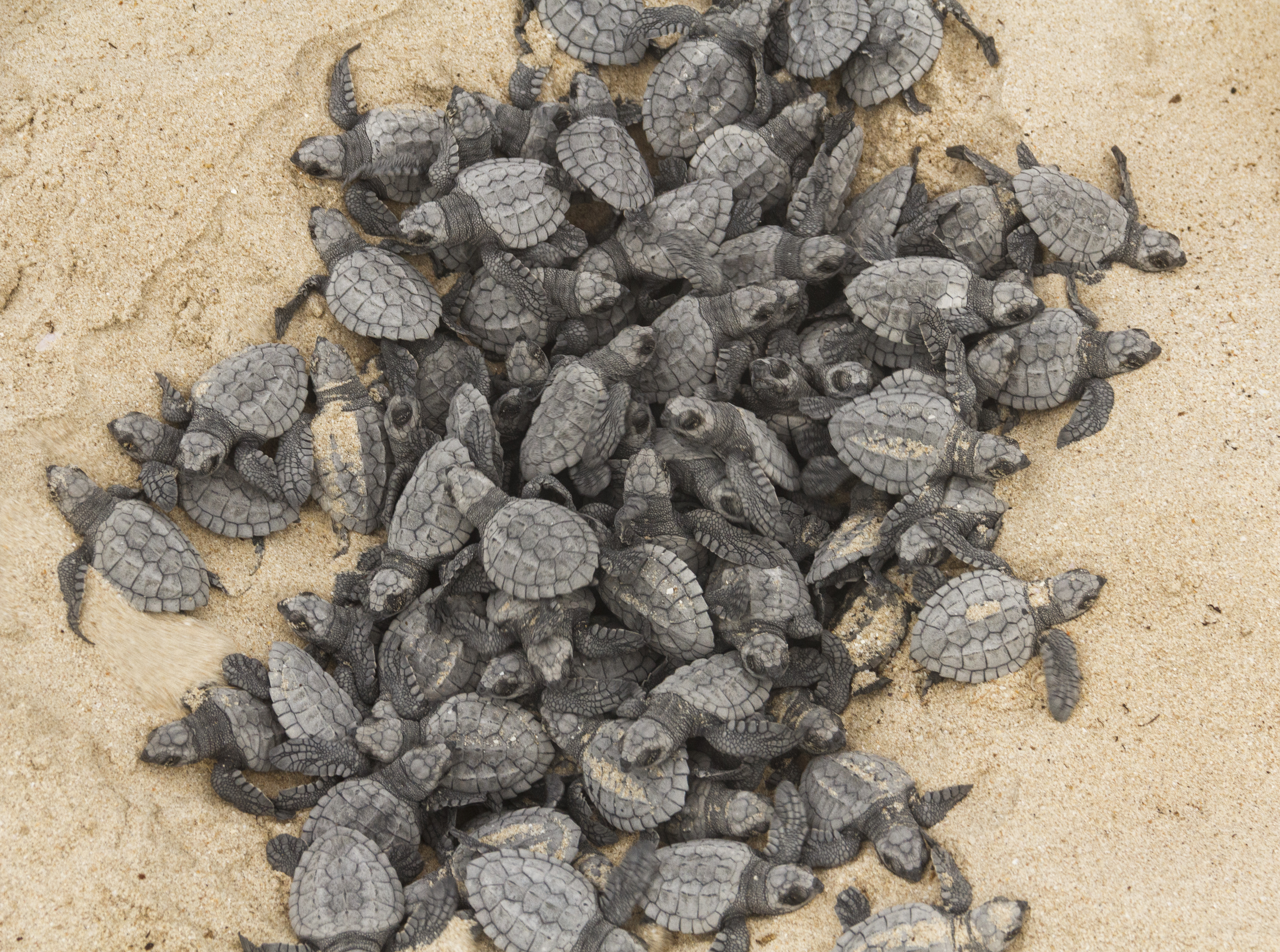
Kemp's ridley hatchlings. Rancho Nuevo, Tamaulipas, Mexico. 2017

In September 2007, Corpus Christi, Texas, wildlife officials found a record of 128 Kemp's ridley sea turtle nests on Texas beaches, including 81 on North Padre Island (Padre Island National Seashore) and four on Mustang Island. The figure was exceeded in each of the following 7 years (see graph to 2013, provisional figures for 2014 as at July, 118.). Wildlife officials released 10,594 Kemp's ridley hatchlings along the Texas coast in 2007. The turtles are popular in Mexico as raw material for boots and as food.

In July 2020, five rehabilitated turtles were released back into Cape Cod with satellite tracking devices to monitor their well-being. A 2020 rescue mission to save 30 turtles from the freezing seas of Cape Cod was delayed by weather and technical issues, spurring a temporary rescue mission en route between Massachusetts and New Mexico. The Tennessee Aquarium offered overnight shelter and care, and the turtles were eventually released to the sea. These cold-stunning events may become more common with rising sea temperatures, as juveniles linger in near-shore waters in the American Northeast and are subjected to late-season storms.

As of June 13, 2025, 383 Kemp's ridley nests were documented on the Texas coast—breaking the previous record of 353 nests set in 2017 at Padre Island National Seashore.

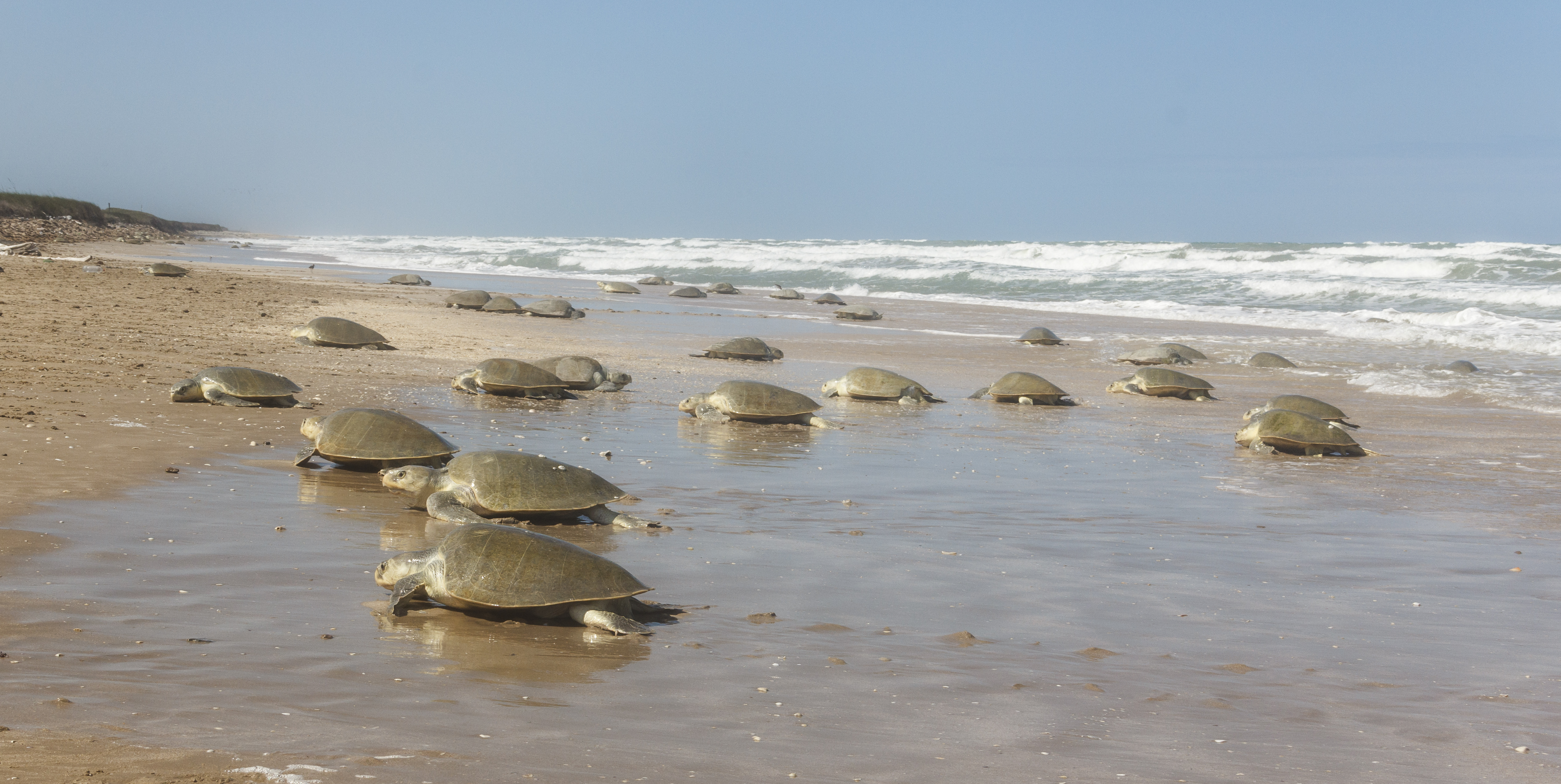
A Kemp's ridley arribada in Rancho Nuevo beach, Tamaulipas, Mexico, in 2017

== Oil spills ==
Some Kemp's ridleys were airlifted from Mexico after the 1979 blowout of the Ixtoc 1 rig, which spilled millions of gallons of oil into the Gulf of Mexico.

Since April 30, 2010, 10 days after the accident on the Deepwater Horizon, 156 sea turtle deaths were recorded; most were Kemp's ridleys. Louisiana Department of Wildlife and Fisheries biologists and enforcement agents rescued Kemp's ridleys in Grand Isle. Most of the 456 oiled turtles that were rescued, cleaned, and released by the US Fish and Wildlife Service were Kemp's ridleys.

Of the endangered marine species frequenting Gulf waters, only Kemp's ridley relies on the region as its sole breeding ground.

As part of the effort to save the species from some of the effects of the Deepwater Horizon oil spill, scientists took nests and incubated them elsewhere; 67 eggs were collected from a nest along the Florida Panhandle on June 26, 2010, and brought to a temperature-controlled warehouse at NASA's Kennedy Space Center, where 56 hatched, and 22 were released on 11 July 2010.

The overall plan was to collect eggs from about 700 sea turtle nests, incubate them, and release the young on beaches across Alabama and Florida over a period of months. Eventually, 278 nests were collected, including only a few Kemp's ridley nests.

Since the 2010 Deepwater Horizon spill, scientists have identified the δ13C values present in turtle scutes to reflect the incorporation of oil. Exposure to oil and the subsequent incorporation of δ13C isotopes have been linked to lessened reproductive success of Kemp's ridley sea turtles.
