= Island gigantism =

Biological phenomenon

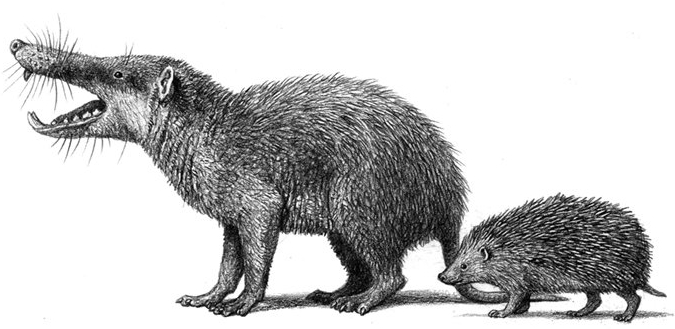
Size comparison of the giant gymnure/moonrat (a type of insectivore closely related to hedgehogs) Deinogalerix from the Late Miocene of Gargano, Italy, next to the related European hedgehog (Erinaceus europaeus)

Island gigantism, or insular gigantism, is a biological phenomenon in which the size of an animal species isolated on an island increases dramatically in comparison to its mainland relatives. Island gigantism is one aspect of the more general "island effect" or "Foster's rule", which posits that when mainland animals colonize islands, small species tend to evolve larger bodies, and large species tend to evolve smaller bodies (insular dwarfism). This is itself one aspect of the more general phenomenon of island syndrome which describes the differences in morphology, ecology, physiology and behaviour of insular (island) species compared to their continental counterparts. Following the arrival of humans and associated introduced predators (dogs, cats, rats, pigs), many giant as well as other island endemics have become extinct (e.g. the dodo and Rodrigues solitaire, giant flightless pigeons related to the Nicobar pigeon). A similar size increase, as well as increased woodiness, has been observed in some insular plants such as the Mapou tree (Cyphostemma mappia) in Mauritius which is also known as the "Mauritian baobab" although it is a member of the grape family (Vitaceae).

== Possible causes ==
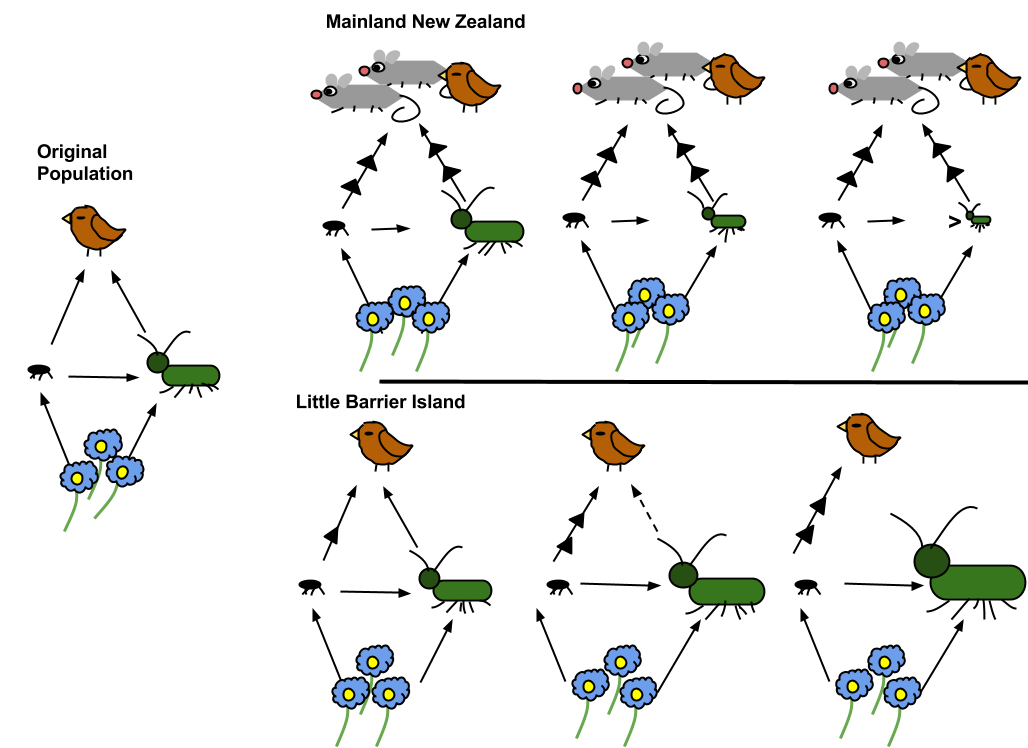
Diagram displaying the change in size of weta species in two ecosystems. The size and population of weta are affected by predation. Rats introduced on the mainland began to prey on weta, reducing their population; weta shrank in response. On an island isolated from predation, such as Little Barrier Island, weta have a dense population and have grown to a massive size. Insular species of giant weta are the only ones not facing extinction. As weta grow over time, bird predation declines.

Large mammalian carnivores are often absent on islands because of insufficient range or difficulties in over-water dispersal. In their absence, the ecological niches for large predators may be occupied by birds, reptiles or smaller carnivorans, which can then grow to larger-than-normal size. For example, on prehistoric Gargano Island in the Miocene-Pliocene Mediterranean, on islands in the Caribbean like Cuba, and on Madagascar and New Zealand, some or all apex predators were birds like eagles, falcons and owls, including some of the largest known examples of these groups.

Since small size usually makes it easier for herbivores to escape or hide from predators, the decreased predation pressure on islands can allow them to grow larger. (Note: The reduction in predation on islands often also leads to tamer behavior of island prey species, a trend that has been analyzed in lizards.) Small herbivores may also benefit from the absence of competition from missing types of large herbivores.

Benefits of large size that have been suggested for island tortoises include decreased vulnerability to scarcity of food and/or water, through ability to survive for longer intervals without them, or ability to travel longer distances to obtain them. Periods of such scarcity may be a greater threat on oceanic islands than on the mainland.

Thus, island gigantism is usually an evolutionary trend resulting from the removal of constraints on the size of small animals related to predation and/or competition. Such constraints can operate differently depending on the size of the animal, however; for example, while small herbivores may escape predation by hiding, large herbivores may deter predators by intimidation. As a result, the complementary phenomenon of island dwarfism can also result from the removal of constraints related to predation and/or competition on the size of large herbivores. In contrast, insular dwarfism among predators more commonly results from the imposition of constraints associated with the limited prey resources available on islands. As opposed to island dwarfism, island gigantism is found in most major vertebrate groups and in invertebrates.

Territorialism may favor the evolution of island gigantism. A study on Anaho Island in Nevada determined that reptile species that were territorial tended to be larger on the island compared to the mainland, particularly in the smaller species. In territorial species, larger size makes individuals better able to compete to defend their territory. This gives additional impetus to evolution toward larger size in an insular population.

A further means of establishing island gigantism may be a founder effect operative when larger members of a mainland population are superior in their ability to colonize islands.

Island size plays a role in determining the extent of gigantism. Smaller islands generally accelerate the rate of evolution of changes in organism size, and organisms there evolve greater extremes in size.

== Examples ==
=== Mammals ===
Many rodents grow larger on islands, whereas carnivorans, proboscideans and artiodactyls usually become smaller.

==== Eulipotyphlans ====
Example	Binomial name	Native range	Current status	Continental relative
Balearic giant shrew	Nesiotites hidalgo	Mallorca and Menorca	Extinct (3000–2000 BC)	Red-toothed shrews
Sardinian shrew	Asoriculus similis	Sardinia and Corsica	Extinct (Holocene)	Red-toothed shrews
Sicilian shrew	Asoriculus burgioi	Sicily	Extinct (Early Pleistocene)	Red-toothed shrews
Deinogalerix	Deinogalerix spp.	Gargano Island	Extinct (Late Miocene)	Moon rats

==== Rodents ====
Example	Binomial name	Native range	Current status	Continental relative	Insular / mainland length or mass ratio
Blunt-toothed giant hutia	Amblyrhiza inundata	Anguilla and Saint Martin	Extinct (Pleistocene)	Neotropical spiny rats	
Larger Jamaican giant hutia	Clidomys osborni	Jamaica	Extinct (Late Pleistocene)	Neotropical spiny rats	
Plate-toothed giant hutia	Elasmodontomys obliquus	Puerto Rico	Extinct (c. 1 AD)	Neotropical spiny rats	
Twisted-toothed mouse	Quemisia gravis	Hispaniola	Extinct	Neotropical spiny rats	
Arboreal giant hutia	Tainotherium valei	Puerto Rico	Extinct	Neotropical spiny rats	
Lesser Jamaica giant hutia	Xaymaca fulvopulvis	Jamaica	Extinct	Neotropical spiny rats	
Mallorcan giant hamsters	Apocricetus darderi	Mallorca	Extinct	Apocricetus alberti	
Mallorcan giant hamsters	Tragomys macpheei	Mallorca	Extinct	Cricetus kormosi	
Gargano giant hamster	Hattomys gargantua	Gargano Island	Extinct	Cricetus kormosi	
St Kilda field mouse	Apodemus sylvaticus hirtensis	St Kilda	Least Concern	Wood mouse	MR ≈ 2
Hensel's field mouse	Rhagamys orthodon	Corsica and Sardinia	Extinct (after 1300 BC)	Wood mouse	
Tenerife giant rat	Canariomys bravoi	Tenerife	Extinct (Late Pleistocene)	African rufous-nosed rats	
Gran Canaria giant rat	Canariomys tamarani	Gran Canaria	Extinct (before AD 1500)	African rufous-nosed rats	
Formentera black-tailed garden dormouse	Eliomys quercinus ophiusae	Formentera	Rare (Introduced by humans)	Garden dormouse and other Leithiinae dormice	
Balearic giant dormice	Hypnomys spp.	Mallorca & Menorca	Extinct (Holocene)	Garden dormouse and other Leithiinae dormice	
Leithia melitensis Sicilian-Maltese giant dormice	Leithia cartei	Sicily and Malta	Extinct	Garden dormouse and other Leithiinae dormice	
Leithia melitensis Sicilian-Maltese giant dormice	Leithia melitensis	Sicily and Malta	Extinct	Garden dormouse and other Leithiinae dormice	
Orkney vole	Microtus arvalis orcadensis	Orkney Islands	Vulnerable	Common vole and other meadow voles	
Gargano giant voles	Mikrotia magna	Gargano Island	Extinct (Early Pliocene)	Common vole and other meadow voles	
Gargano giant voles	M. maiuscula	Gargano Island	Extinct (Early Pliocene)	Common vole and other meadow voles	
Gargano giant voles	M. parva	Gargano Island	Extinct (Early Pliocene)	Common vole and other meadow voles	
St Kilda house mouse	Mus musculus muralis	St Kilda	Extinct (c. AD 1930)	House mouse	
Flores giant rat	Papagomys armandvillei	Flores	Near Threatened	North African black rat and other true rats	
Sulawesi giant rat	Paruromys dominator	Sulawesi	Least Concern	North African black rat and other true rats	
Admiralty giant rat	Rattus detentus	Manus Island	Unknown / Likely threatened	North African black rat and other true rats	
Congreso black rat population	Rattus rattus	Isla del Congreso	Least Concern	North African black rat and other true rats	
Channel Islands deer mice	Peromyscus anyapahensis	Northern Channel Islands of California	Extinct (c. 6000 BC)	North American deer mouse	
Channel Islands deer mice	P. nesodytes	Northern Channel Islands of California	Extinct (c. 6000 BC)	North American deer mouse	
Gargano giant dormouse	Stertomys laticrestatus	Gargano Island	Extinct	Glirinae dormice	

==== Lagomorphs ====
Example	Binomial name	Native range	Current status	Continental relative
Minorcan giant lagomorph	Nuralagus rex	Minorca	Extinct (Middle Pliocene)	Alilepus (?)
Minorcan giant lagomorph	Nuralagus rex	Minorca	Extinct (Middle Pliocene)	Trischizolagus (?)
	Prolagus imperialis	Gargano Island	Extinct	Pikas
Sardinian pika	Prolagus sardus	Corsica, Sardinia and Tavolara	Extinct (c. AD 1800)	Pikas

==== Primates ====
Example	Binomial name	Native range	Current status	Continental relative
Hispaniola monkey	Antillothrix bernensis	Hispaniola	Extinct (before AD 1600)	Cheracebus
Haitian monkey	Insulacebus toussaintiana	Southwestern Haiti	Extinct	Cheracebus
Cuban monkeys	Paralouatta marianae	Cuba	Extinct (Pleistocene)	Cheracebus
Cuban monkeys	P. varonai	Cuba	Extinct (Pleistocene)	Cheracebus
Jamaican monkey	Xenothrix mcgregori	Jamaica	Extinct	Cheracebus
Gorilla lemur	Archaeoindris fontoynontii	Central Madagascar	Extinct (c. 350 BC)	Lorisoids
Baboon lemurs	Archaeolemur spp.	Madagascar	Extinct (before AD 1280)	Lorisoids
Baboon lemurs	Hadropithecus spp.	Madagascar	Extinct (before AD 1280)	Lorisoids
Sloth lemurs	Babakotia spp.	Western and Central Madagascar	Extinct (c. AD 1500)	Lorisoids
Sloth lemurs	Palaeopropithecus spp.	Western and Central Madagascar	Extinct (c. AD 1500)	Lorisoids
Koala lemurs	Megaladapis edwardsi	Madagascar	Extinct (AD 1280–1420)	Lorisoids
Koala lemurs	M. grandidieri	Madagascar	Extinct (AD 1280–1420)	Lorisoids
Koala lemurs	M. madagascariensis	Madagascar	Extinct (AD 1280–1420)	Lorisoids

==== Carnivorans ====
Example	Binomial name	Native range	Current status	Continental relative
Sardinian giant otter	Megalenhydris barbaricina	Sardinia	Extinct (Late Pleistocene)	Otters
Fossa	Cryptoprocta ferox	Madagascar	Vulnerable	Mongooses
Giant fossa	Cryptoprocta spelaea	Madagascar	Extinct (before AD 1400)	Mongooses
Cryptoprocta bevatabe	Cryptoprocta bevatabe	Madagascar	Extinct (before BC 6300)	

==== Gondwanatherians ====
Example	Binomial name	Native range	Current status	Continental relative
Vintana	Vintana sertichi	Madagascar	Extinct (Late Cretaceous)	South American, India, African and Antarctic gondwanatheres.
Adalatherium	Adalatherium hui	Madagascar	Extinct (Late Cretaceous)	South American, India, African and Antarctic gondwanatheres.

=== Birds ===
==== Stem birds ====
Example	Binomial name	Native range	Current status	Continental relative
Balaur	B. bondoc	Hațeg Island	Extinct (Late Cretaceous)	Jeholornis
Gargantuavis	G. philohinos	Ibero-Armorican Island	Extinct (Late Cretaceous)	Patagopteryx (?)

==== Ratites ====
Example	Binomial name	Native range	Current status	Continental relative
Kiwis	Apterygidae	New Zealand	Variable	Proapteryx (Note: The earliest known New Zealand kiwi ancestor, a presumed recent arrival from Australia.)
Greater elephant birds	Aepyornithidae	Madagascar	Extinct (c. AD 1700)	Proapteryx
Lesser elephant birds	Mullerornithidae	Madagascar	Extinct (c. AD 1260)	Proapteryx
Giant moas	Dinornithidae	New Zealand	Extinct (c. AD 1450)	Tinamous
Lesser moas	Emeidae	New Zealand	Extinct (c. AD 1460)	Tinamous
Upland moas	Megalapterygidae	New Zealand	Extinct (c. AD 1300)	Tinamous

==== Waterfowl ====
Example	Binomial name	Native range	Current status	Continental relative
New Zealand musk duck	Biziura delautouri	New Zealand	Extinct (after AD 1500)	Australian musk duck
New Zealand geese	Cnemiornis calcitrans	New Zealand	Extinct	Cape Barren goose
New Zealand geese	C. gracilis	New Zealand	Extinct	Cape Barren goose
Garganornis	G. ballmanni	Gargano and Scontrone islands	Extinct (Late Miocene)	Geese
Turtle-jawed moa-nalo	Chelychelynechen quassus	Kauai	Extinct (c. AD 1000)	Dabbling ducks
Small-billed moa-nalo	Ptaiochen pau	Maui	Extinct (c. AD 1000)	Dabbling ducks
Large-billed moa-nalo	Thambetochen chauliodous	Maui Nui	Extinct (c. AD 1000)	Dabbling ducks
O'ahu moa-nalo	Thambetochen xanion	O'ahu	Extinct (c. AD 1000)	Dabbling ducks
Giant swan	Cygnus falconeri	Sicily and Malta	Extinct (Middle Pleistocene)	Mute swan
Scarlett's duck	Malacorhynchus scarletti	New Zealand	Extinct (after AD 1500)	Pink-eared duck

==== Pangalliformes ====
Example	Binomial name	Native range	Current status	Continental relative
Pile-builder megapode	Megapodius molistructor	New Caledonia and Tonga	Extinct (c. 1500 BC)	Scrubfowl
Megavitiornis	Megavitiornis altirostris	Fiji	Extinct	Galliformes
Sylviornis	Sylviornis neocaledoniae	New Caledonia and Isle of Pines	Extinct	Galliformes

==== Gruiformes ====
Example	Binomial name	Native range	Current status	Continental relative
Red rail	Aphanapteryx bonasia	Mauritius	Extinct (c. AD 1700)	Rails
Hawkins' rail	Diaphanapteryx hawkinsi	Chatham Islands	Extinct (c. AD 1900)	Rails
Antillean cave rail	Nesotrochis debooyi	Puerto Rico and Virgin Islands	Extinct	Rails
Cuban cave rail	Nesotrochis picapicensis	Cuba	Extinct	Rails
Haitian cave rail	N. steganinos	Hispaniola	Extinct	Rails
South Island takahē	Porphyrio hochstetteri	South Island, New Zealand	Endangered	Rails
North Island takahē	Porphyrio mantelli	North Island, New Zealand	Extinct (before AD 1900)	Rails
Adzebills	Aptornis defossor	New Zealand	Extinct	Madagascar flufftail
Adzebills	A. otidiformis	New Zealand	Extinct	Madagascar flufftail
Chatham coot	Fulica chathamensis	Chatham Islands	Extinct (after AD 1500)	Red-knobbed coot and other coots
Mascarene coot	Fulica newtonii	Mauritius and Réunion	Extinct (c. AD 1700)	Red-knobbed coot and other coots
New Zealand coot	Fulica prisca	New Zealand	Extinct (after AD 1280)	Red-knobbed coot and other coots
Réunion swamphen	Porphyrio coerulescens	Plaine des Cafres, Réunion	Extinct (c. AD 1730)	Purple swamphens

==== Pigeons ====
Example	Binomial name	Native range	Current status	Continental relative
Viti Levu giant pigeon	Natunaornis gigoura	Viti Levu, Fiji	Extinct	Crowned pigeons
Kanaka pigeon	Caloenas canacorum	New Caledonia	Extinct (c. 500 BC)	Nicobar pigeon
Rodrigues solitaire	Pezophaps solitaria	Rodrigues	Extinct (before AD 1778)	Nicobar pigeon
Dodo	Raphus cucullatus	Mauritius	Extinct (c. AD 1662)	Nicobar pigeon

==== Birds of prey ====
Example	Binomial name	Native range	Current status	Continental relative
Liko Cave golden eagle	Aquila chrysaetos simurgh	Crete	Extinct (Late Pleistocene)	Golden eagle
Giant crab-hawk	Buteogallus borrasi	Cuba	Extinct	Great black hawk and other hawks
Giant hawk	Gigantohierax sp.	Cuba	Extinct	Great black hawk and other hawks
Titan-hawk	Titanohierax gloveralleni	Cuba, Hispaniola and the Bahamas	Extinct	Great black hawk and other hawks
Jamaican caracara	Caracara tellustris	Jamaica	Extinct	Caracaras
Eyles' harrier	Circus eylesi	New Zealand	Extinct (c. AD 1000)	Swamp harrier
Gargano Island eagles	Garganoaetus freudenthali	Gargano Island	Extinct (Late Miocene)	Aquila delphinensis
Gargano Island eagles	G. murivorus	Gargano Island	Extinct (Late Miocene)	Aquila delphinensis
Haast's eagle	Hieraaetus moorei	New Zealand	Extinct (c. AD 1400)	Little eagle
Philippine eagle	Pithecophaga jefferyi	Philippines	Critically endangered	Bateleur

==== Parrots ====
Example	Binomial name	Native range	Current status	Continental relative
Hercules parrot	Heracles inexpectatus	New Zealand	Extinct (Miocene)	Other parrots
Kākāpō	Strigops habroptilus	New Zealand	Critically Endangered	Other parrots
Broad-billed parrot	Lophopsittacus mauritianus	Mauritius	Extinct (c. AD 1680)	Psittaculine parrots

==== Owls ====
Example	Binomial name	Native range	Current status	Continental relative
Cretan owl	Athene cretensis	Crete	Extinct (Pleistocene)	Little owl
Cuban giant owls	Ornimegalonyx spp.	Cuba	Extinct (Pleistocene)	Wood owls
Greater Gargano giant owl	Tyto gigantea	Gargano Island	Extinct (Late Miocene)	Barn owls
Andros Island barn owl	Tyto pollens	Andros Island, Bahamas	Extinct (before AD 1600)	Barn owls
Rivero's barn owl	Tyto riveroi	Cuba	Extinct	Barn owls
Lesser Gargano giant owl	Tyto robusta	Gargano Island	Extinct (Early Pliocene)	Barn owls

==== Caprimulgiformes ====
Example	Binomial name	Native range	Current status	Continental relative
New Zealand owlet-nightjar	Aegotheles novazelandiae	New Zealand	Extinct (c. AD 1200)	Australian owlet-nightjar
New Caledonian owlet-nightjar	Aegotheles savesi	New Caledonia	Critically endangered	Australian owlet-nightjar

==== Passeriforms ====
Example	Binomial name	Native range	Current status	Continental relative
Chatham raven	Corvus moriorum	Chatham Islands	Extinct	New Zealand raven
Long-legged bunting	Emberiza alcoveri	Tenerife	Extinct (after AD 1)	Cabanis's bunting
Giant nukupu'u	Hemignathus vorpalis	Hawaii	Extinct (after AD 1000)	Finches
Tasmanian superb fairywren	Malurus cyaneus cyaneus	Tasmania	Least Concern	Superb fairywren
Kangaroo Island superb fairywren	M. c. ashbyi	Kangaroo Island	Least Concern	Superb fairywren
Stout-legged wren	Pachyplichas yaldwyni	South Island of New Zealand	Extinct	Other passeriforms
St Kilda wren	Troglodytes troglodytes hirtensis	St Kilda, Scotland	Unknown	Eurasian wren
Capricorn silvereye	Zosterops lateralis chlorocephalus	Capricorn and Bunker Group of the Australian Great Barrier Reef	Unknown	Silvereye

=== Reptiles ===
==== Iguanids ====
Example	Binomial name	Native range	Current status	Continental relative	Insular / mainland length or mass ratio
Tongan giant iguana	Brachylophus gibbonsi	Tonga	Extinct (c. 800 BC)	South American iguanas	
Fijian giant iguana	Lapitiguana impensa	Fiji	Extinct (c. 1000 BC)	South American iguanas	
Angel Island chuckwalla	Sauromalus hispidus	Isla Ángel de la Guarda, Baja California	Endangered	Peninsular chuckwalla	MR ≈ 5
San Esteban chuckwalla	Sauromalus varius	San Esteban Island, Baja California	Vulnerable	Peninsular chuckwalla	MR ≈ 5

==== Geckos ====
Example	Binomial name	Native range	Current status	Continental relative	Insular / mainland length or mass ratio
Delcourt's giant gekko	Gigarcanum delcourti	New Caledonia	Extinct (c. AD 1870)	Diplodactylid geckos	LR ≈ 6.75 (Note: Based on the estimated total length of H. delcourti, ~23.6 in, and the average length of a member of Diplodactylus, the most species-rich genus of Australian diplodactylid geckos, ~3.5 in.)
New Caledonian giant gecko	Rhacodactylus leachianus	New Caledonia	Least Concern	Diplodactylid geckos	LR ≈ 4.4 (Note: Based on the average total length of the larger subspecies, R. l. leachianus, ~15.5 in, and the average length of a member of Diplodactylus, the most species-rich genus of Australian diplodactylid geckos, ~3.5 in.); MR ≈ 60 (Note: Based on the average mass of the larger subspecies, R. l. leachianus, ~240 g, with the average weight of a member of Diplodactylus, the most species-rich genus of Australian diplodactylid geckos, ~4 g.)
Rodrigues giant day gecko	Phelsuma gigas	Rodrigues	Extinct (c. AD 1850)	Day geckos	

==== Skinks ====
Example	Binomial name	Native range	Current status	Continental relative
Vaillant's mabuya	Chioninia vaillanti	Cape Verde	Endangered	Mainland mabuyine skinks
Cape Verde giant skink	Chioninia coctei	Cape Verde	Extinct (after AD 1900)	Mainland mabuyine skinks
Mauritius giant skink	Leiolopisma mauritiana	Mauritius	Extinct (after AD 1600)	Mainland eugongyline skinks
Terror skink	Phoboscincus bocourti	Île des Pins off New Caledonia	Endangered	Mainland eugongyline skinks
Kishinoue's giant skink	Plestiodon kishinouyei	Miyako Islands and Yaeyama Islands, Japan	Vulnerable	Plestiodon tamdaoensis

==== Wall lizards ====
Example	Binomial name	Native range	Current status	Continental relative
La Palma giant lizard	Gallotia auaritae	La Palma	Critically endangered	Mediterranean sandrunner lizards
La Gomera giant lizard	Gallotia bravoana	Gomera	Critically endangered	Mediterranean sandrunner lizards
Tenerife giant lizard	Gallotia goliath	Tenerife	Extinct (c. AD 1500)	Mediterranean sandrunner lizards
El Hierro giant lizard	Gallotia simonyi	El Hierro	Critically endangered	Mediterranean sandrunner lizards
Gran Canaria giant lizard	Gallotia stehlini	Gran Canaria	Least Concern	Mediterranean sandrunner lizards

==== Snakes ====
Example	Binomial name	Native range	Current status	Continental relative
Angel de la Guarda Island speckled rattlesnake	Crotalus mitchellii angelensis	Isla Ángel de la Guarda off Baja California	Least Concern	Speckled rattlesnake
Tadanae-jima striped snake population	Elaphe quadrivirgata	Tadanae-jima island off Tokyo	Unknown	Japanese striped snake
Island tiger snake populations	Notechis scutatus	Islands Mount Chappell (Tasmania); Williams, Hopkins, and the Nuyts Archipelago (all South Australia)	Least Concern	Tiger snake
Isla Cerralvo long-nosed snake	Rhinocheilus lecontei etheridgei	Jacques Cousteau Island off Baja California Sur	Unknown	Long-nosed snake

==== Dubious examples ====
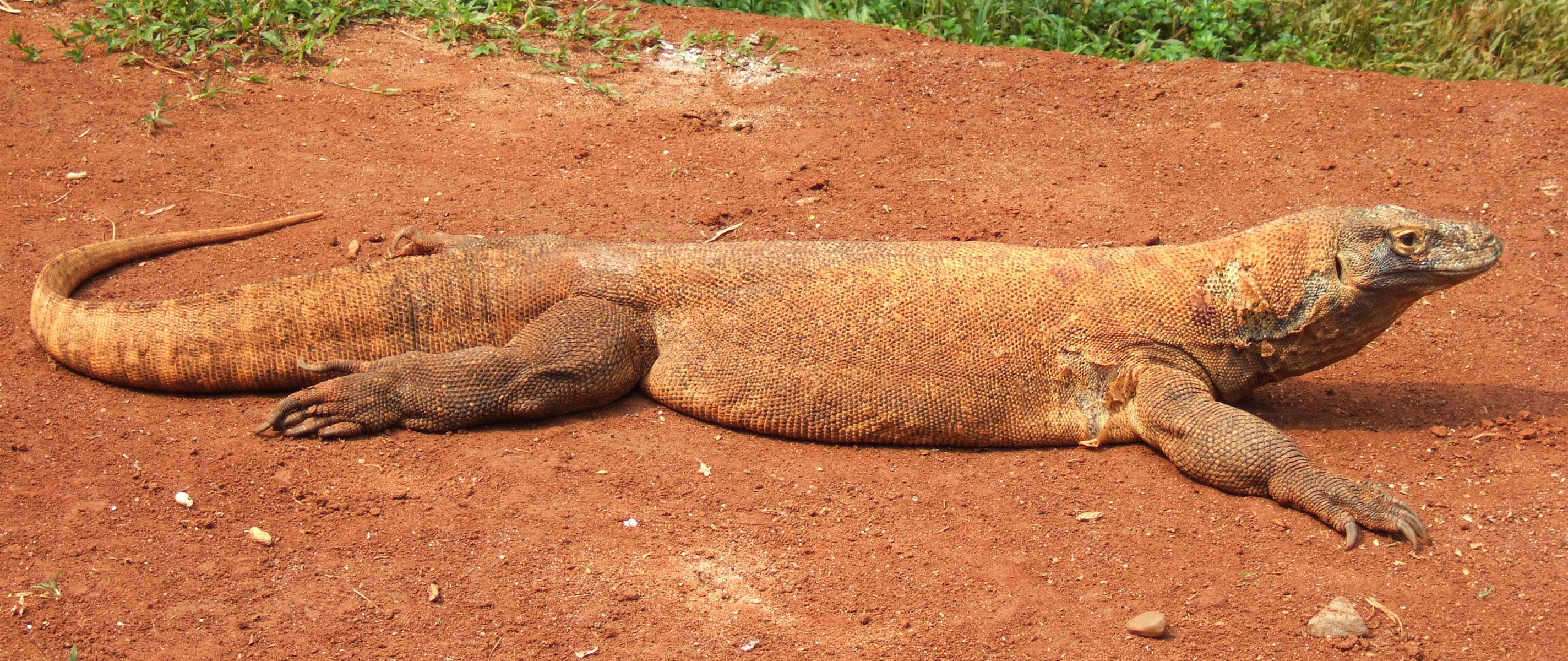
Komodo dragon (Lesser Sundas)

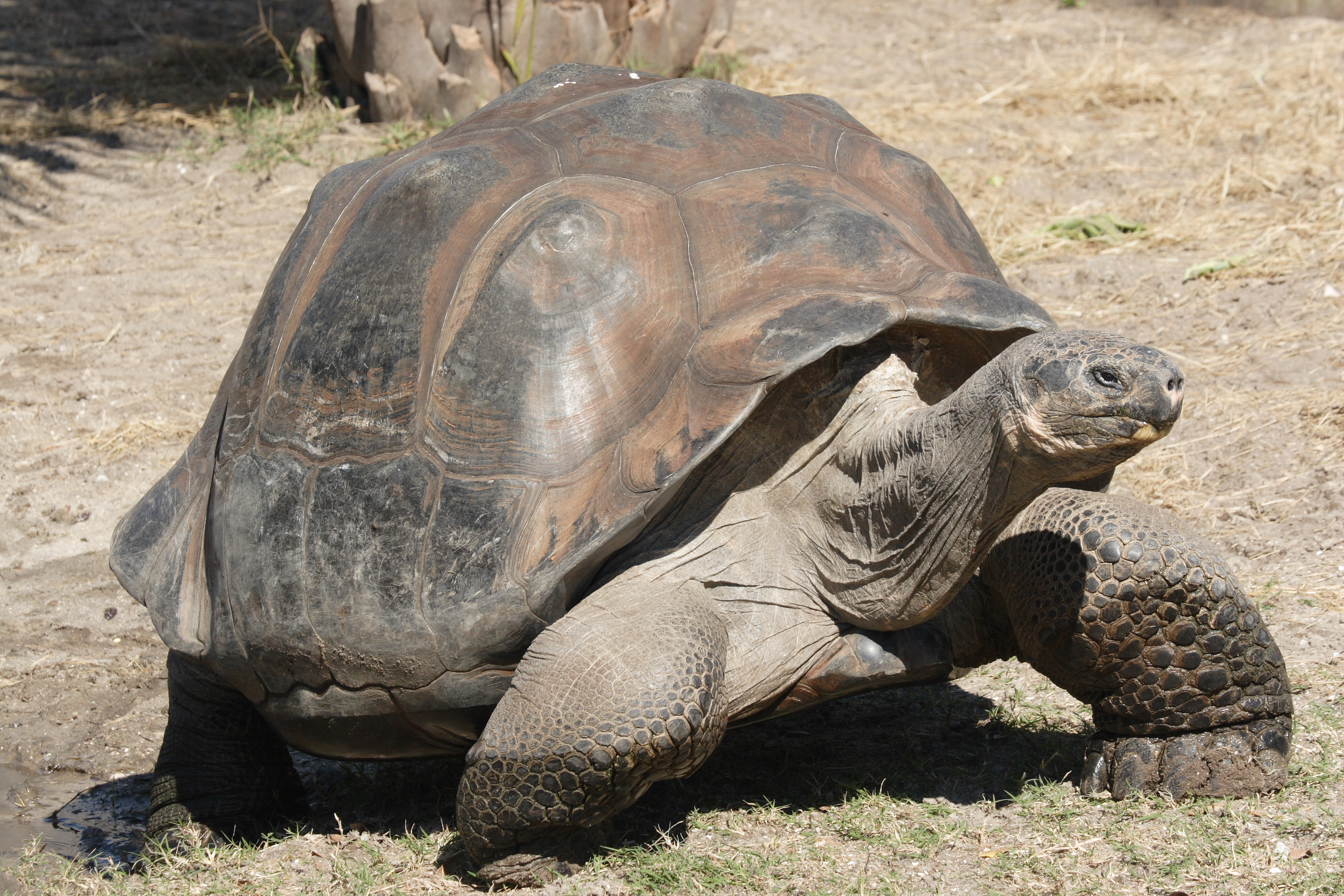
Galápagos giant tortoise

- The Komodo dragon of Flores and nearby islands, the largest extant lizard, and a similar (extinct) giant monitor lizard from Timor have been regarded as examples of giant insular carnivores. Since islands tend to offer limited food and territory, their mammalian carnivores (if present) are usually smaller than continental ones. These cases involve ectothermic carnivores on islands too small to support much mammalian competition. However, these lizards are not as large as their extinct Australian relative Megalania, and it has been proposed based on fossil evidence that the ancestors of these varanids first evolved their large size in Australia and then dispersed to Indonesia. If this is true, rather than being insular giants they would be viewed as examples of phyletic gigantism. Supporting this interpretation is evidence for a lizard in Pliocene India, Varanus sivalensis, comparable in size to V. komodoensis. Nevertheless, given that Australia is often described as the world's largest island and that the related Megalania, the largest terrestrial lizard known in the fossil record, was restricted to Australia, the perception of the largest Australasian/Indonesian lizards as insular giants may still have some validity.
- Giant tortoises in the Galápagos Islands and the Seychelles, the largest extant tortoises, as well as extinct tortoises of the Mascarenes and Canary Islands, are often considered examples of island gigantism. However, during the Pleistocene, comparably sized or larger tortoises were present in Australia (Meiolania), southern Asia (Megalochelys), Europe (Titanochelon), Madagascar (Aldabrachelys), North America (Hesperotestudo) and South America (Chelonoidis, the same genus now found in the Galápagos), and on a number of other, more accessible islands of Oceania and the Caribbean. In the late Pliocene they were also present in Africa ("Geochelone" laetoliensis). The present situation of large tortoises being found only on remote islands appears to reflect that these islands were discovered by humans recently and have not been heavily settled, making their tortoises less subject to overexploitation.
- Hatzegopteryx has features of island gigantism such as a more robust bodyplan and occupying niches taken by megafauna elsewhere (in this case, theropod dinosaurs). However, similar sized giant pterosaurs occurred elsewhere, though nowhere near as robust.

=== Amphibians ===
Example	Binomial name	Native range	Current status	Continental relative	Insular / mainland length or mass ratio
São Tomé giant tree frog	Hyperolius thomensis	São Tomé Island	Endangered	African reed frogs	
Palm forest tree frog	Leptopelis palmatus	Príncipe Island	Vulnerable	Red tree frog	LR ≈ 1.2 (Note: Based on the average female snout to vent length (SVL) of L. palmatus, ~96 mm, with the average female SVL of L. rufus, ~80 mm.)
Giant Fiji ground frog	Platymantis megabotoniviti	Viti Levu, Fiji	Extinct	Asian platymantines	
São Tomé giant grass frog	Ptychadena newtoni	São Tomé Island	Endangered	Mascarene grass frog	

=== Arthropods ===
Example	Binomial name	Native range	Current status	Continental relative
Coconut crab	Birgus latro	Indian Ocean islands and Polynesia	Vulnerable	Coenobita hermit crabs
Giant weta	Deinacrida spp.	New Zealand	Variable	South African king crickets
Giant pseudoscorpion	Garypus titanius	Boatswain Bird Island	Critically Endangered	Garypoids
Hissing cockroaches	Gromphadorhini spp.	Madagascar	Unknown	Blaberids
Saint Helena earwig	Labidura herculeana	Saint Helena	Extinct (c. AD 1967)	Shore earwig
Wallace's giant bee	Megachile pluto	North Moluccas	Vulnerable	Callomegachile
Megalara	Megalara garuda	Mekongga Mountains, Sulawesi	Unknown	Crabronine wasps
Madagascan giant pill-millipedes	Microsphaerotherium spp.	Madagascar	Unknown	Indian giant pill-millipedes (Arthrosphaera)
Madagascan giant pill-millipedes	Sphaeromimus spp.	Madagascar	Unknown	Indian giant pill-millipedes (Arthrosphaera)
Madagascan giant pill-millipedes	Zoosphaerium spp.	Madagascar	Unknown	Indian giant pill-millipedes (Arthrosphaera)
Orsonwelles	Orsonwelles spp.	Hawaii	Unknown	Money spiders
Conant's giant Nīhoa tree cricket	Thaumatogryllus conanti	Nīhoa	Unknown	Tree crickets
Giant Fijian long-horned beetle	Xixuthrus heros	Viti Levu, Fiji	Endangered	Australasian Xixuthrus
Taveuni beetle	Xixuthrus terribilis	Taveuni, Fiji	Unknown	Australasian Xixuthrus
Tyrannomolpus	Tyrannomolpus rex	Three Kings Islands	Unknown	Pilacolaspis leaf beetles

=== Gastropods ===
Example	Binomial name	Native range	Current status	Continental relative
Kauri land snails	Paryphanta spp.	New Zealand	Near Threatened	Other rhytidids
Kauri land snails	Powelliphanta spp.	New Zealand	Near Threatened	Other rhytidids

=== Flora ===
In addition to size increase, island plants may also exhibit "insular woodiness". The most notable examples are the megaherbs of New Zealand's subantarctic islands. Increased leaf and seed size was also reported in some island species regardless of growth form (herbaceous, bush, or tree).

Example	Binomial name	Native range	Current status	Continental relative
Campbell Island carrot	Anisotome latifolia	Campbell and Auckland Islands	Unknown	Apiaceae
Ross lily	Bulbinella rossii	Campbell and Auckland Islands	Naturally Uncommon	New Zealand Maori lily
Chatham Islands korokio	Corokia macrocarpa	Chatham Islands	Unknown	New Zealand korokio
Black-eyed daisy	Damnamenia vernicosa	Auckland and Campbell Islands	Naturally Uncommon	Astereae
Cucumber tree	Dendrosicyos socotranus	Socotra	Vulnerable	Gourds
St. Catherine's lace	Eriogonum giganteum	California Channel Islands	Naturally Uncommon	Eriogonum
Coco de mer	Lodoicea maldivica	Seychelles	Endangered	Borassoid palms
	Pleurophyllum criniferum	Antipodes, Auckland and Campbell Islands	Unknown	Cineraria
Silver-leaf daisy	Pleurophyllum hookeri	Macquarie Island, Auckland and Campbell Islands	Unknown	Cineraria
Campbell Island daisy	Pleurophyllum speciosum	Campbell and Auckland Islands	Naturally Uncommon	Cineraria
Macquarie Island cabbage	Stilbocarpa polaris	Macquarie Island and New Zealand subantarctic islands	Vulnerable	Araliaceae

== See also ==
- Deep-sea gigantism
- Island tameness
- Insular dwarfism
- Megafauna
- Pleistocene extinctions
- Polar gigantism
