= Gargano =

Historical and geographical region of Italy

Coordinates: 41.733°N 15.750°E

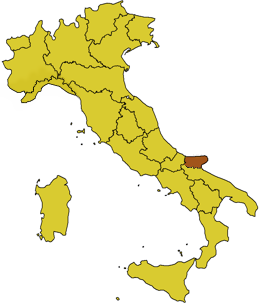
Position of the Gargano sub-region (highlighted in brown) within Italy: 'the spur on the boot of Italy'

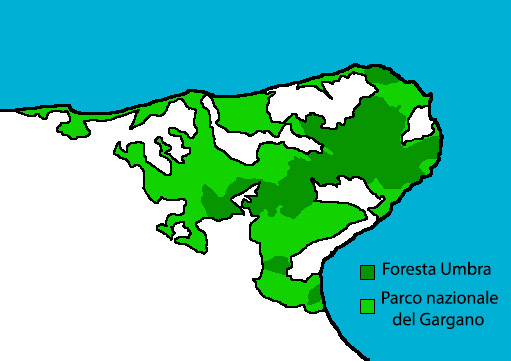
Gargano National Park, showing ancient woodlands of the Foresta Umbra

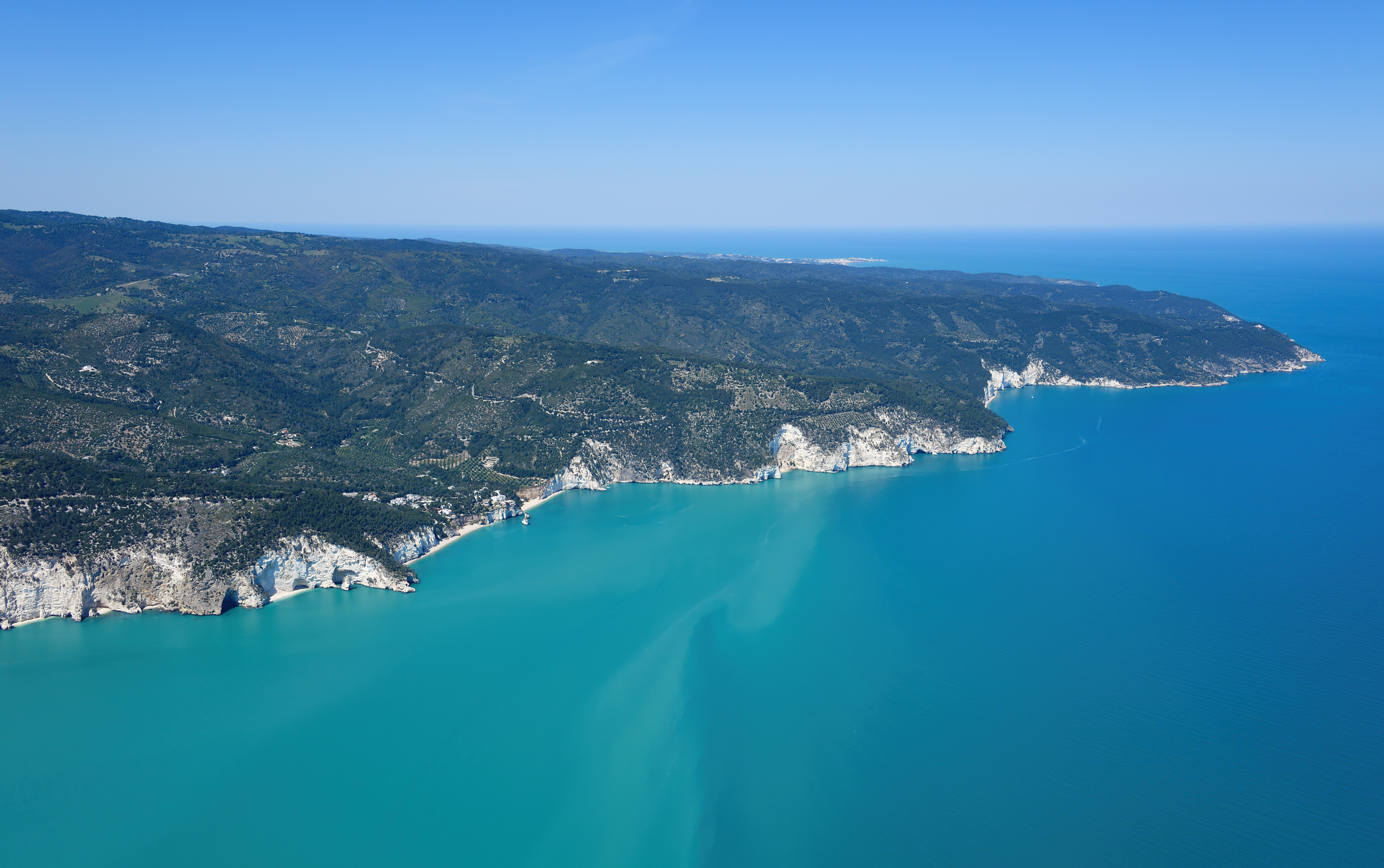
The limestone cliffs of Gargano's southeast coast, with Baia delle Zagare to the left of the center of the image

Gargano (Italian: [ɡarˈɡaːno]) is a historical and geographical sub-region in the province of Foggia, Apulia, southeast Italy, consisting of a wide isolated mountain massif made of highland and several peaks and forming the backbone of a promontory projecting into the Adriatic Sea, the "spur" on the Italian "boot".

== Monte Calvo ==
The high point is Monte Calvo at 1,065 m (3,494 ft). Most of the upland area, about 1,200 km^{2} (460 sq mi), is part of the Gargano National Park, founded in 1991.

The Gargano peninsula is partly covered by the remains of an ancient forest, Foresta Umbra, the only remaining part in Italy of the ancient oak and beech forest that once covered much of Central Europe as well as the Apennine deciduous montane forests ecoregion. The Latin poet Horace spoke of the oaks of Garganus in Ode II, ix.

In this region since 1978 a feud has been fought between the clans of the Società foggiana.

== Tourism ==
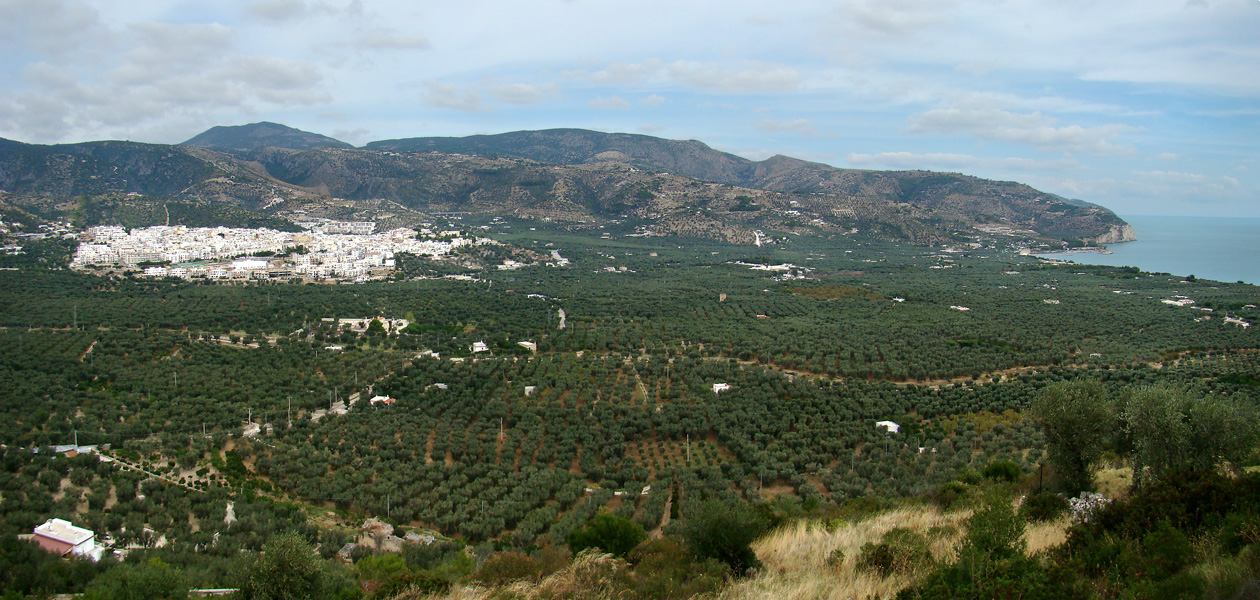
The coast around Mattinata

The coast of Gargano houses numerous beaches and tourist facilities, including resorts such as Vieste, Peschici and Mattinata. The two major salt lakes of Lesina and Varano are located in the northern part of the peninsula. Gargano is the site of the oldest shrine in Western Europe dedicated to the archangel Michael: the Sanctuary of Saint Michael the Archangel.

Other tourist attractions includes the Sanctuary of Saint Pio of Pietrelcina in San Giovanni Rotondo, the Abbey of Saint Mary of Ripalta (Lesina) and the volcanic rocks, dating back to the Triassic Period, known as "Black Stones" in Lesina, as well as the Sanctuary of Saint Nazario.

=== Annual events ===
- Saint Primiano and the saint sailing-race on 15 May
- Saint Nazario and the pilgrimage to the Sanctuary with the same name on July 28
- Saint Rocco's Day on 15, 16 and 17 August in Rignano Garganico
- Procession of the Fracchie on Good Friday in San Marco in Lamis
- Saint Valentine's day in Vico del Gargano
- Pilgrimages (cumpagnie) to the shrine of Saint Michael the Archangel in Monte Sant'Angelo on May 8 and September 29
- Gargano Running Week is held in October, the first time in 2014 and includes trail running, skyrunning, jogging, ultra distance running and speed running. The 10 K and the half marathon are supervised by FIDAL.

== Gargano Peninsula fossils ==
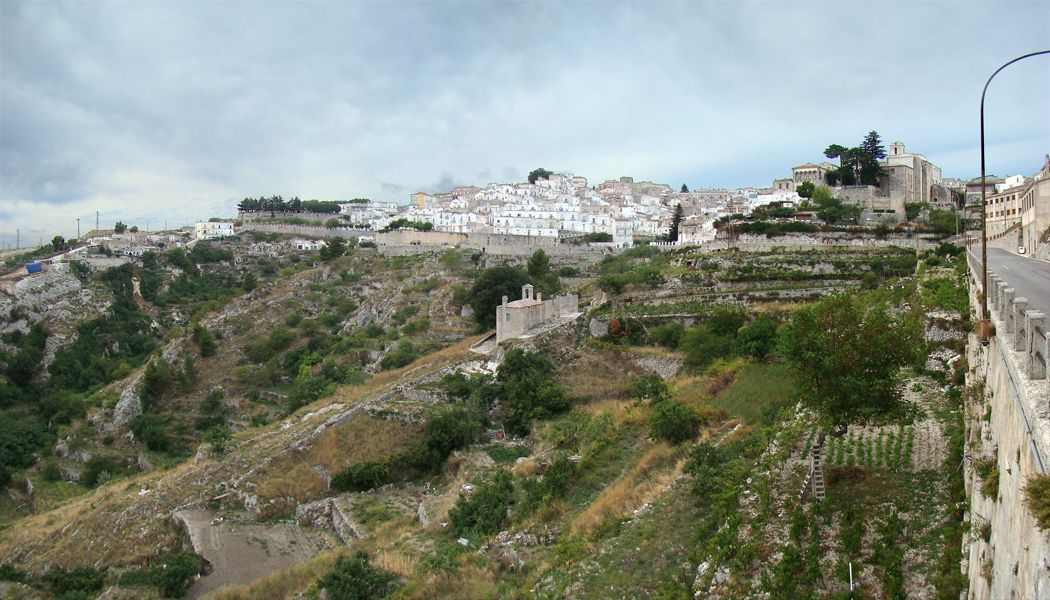
Monte Sant'Angelo on the slopes of Gargano

The Gargano peninsula is associated with the Gargano fauna, also referred to as the Terre Rosse ("Red Soils") fauna or the Mikrotia fauna. Between the Miocene and the early Pliocene, this area consisted of large island that included both the modern Gargano peninsula proper and adjacent parts of peninsular Italy, with other locales associated with its fauna having been found in Scontrone and Palena, Abruzzo. Like other island endemic environments, the Gargano fauna was notably unbalanced. Mammals were represented chiefly by rodents and other microfauna, all of which displayed island gigantism, alongside a single species of marine otter and one native genus of ruminants. Birds were also well-represented, including both giant and flightless species, and birds of prey made up a large proportion of the island's native predators. Among the rodents, glirids were especially diverse.

The fossils have been primarily recovered from partially infilled paleokarst fissures across Monte Gargano. Locales in Abruzzo consist instead of marine and beach deposits.

Early descriptions of the Gargano fauna speculated that it originated from a single colonization event through a direct land bridge or a series of close islands, either through the Apennines chain or from the Balkan Peninsula, potentially associated with the desiccation of the Mediterranean basin during the Messinian salinity crisis in the late Miocene. This was challenged beginning in the 1980s on the basis of the low and fragmented biodiversity of the fauna and the "staggered" appearance of new taxa, suggesting multiple waves of colonization through indirect methods such as rafting or flying during periods of low sea level. Some paleontologists, beginning with P.M. Butler in 1980, have speculated that the Gargano fauna was "seeded" by a surviving relic of an older continental fauna later added to by invasions of other species, in part to account for the presence of animals like amphibians that cannot easily cross saltwater.

The surface features of the ancient karst developed in Mesozoic limestone. In these, sediment accumulated together with the remains of the local fauna, forming thick layers of reddish, massive or crudely stratified silty-sandy clays, known as terrae rossae ("red soils"). Through the mid-Pliocene, some of these deposits were flooded, probably due to tectonic movement of the Apulian Plate. Others were overlaid by other sediments of terrestrial or freshwater origin. In this way a buried, partially reworked paleokarst originated.

Later, as the ice ages cycle got underway, sea levels sank and the former island was continentalized. In the cool and semiarid conditions of the Early Pleistocene (some 1.8–0.8 mya) a second karstic cycle occurred, producing the neokarst which removed part of the paleokarst fill.

=== Fauna ===
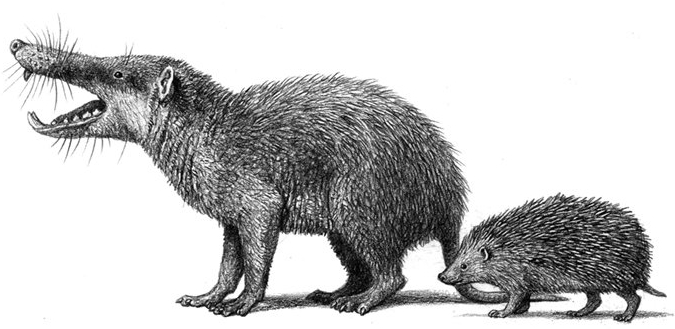
Deinogalerix in scale with a modern European hedgehog by Mauricio Antón.

The Gargano Island endemic mammals included:

- Deinogalerix - 5 species of gymnures ("hairy hedgehogs"), among them the giant D. koenigswaldi with a skull of c.20 cm length. (Freudenthal, 1972; Butler, 1980)
- Hoplitomeryx - some 5 species of "prongdeer" with five horns and sabre-like upper canine teeth. They ranged from tiny to the size of a red deer, and large and small ones apparently occurred at the same time rather than one evolving from the other. (Leinders 1984, van der Geer 2005, van der Geer 2008)
- Mikrotia - 3 or more species of murine rodent. The largest species, M. magna, had a skull 10 cm long. (Freudenthal, 1976, Parra et al., 1999)
- Paralutra garganensis - an endemic species of otter. (Willemsen, 1983)
- Prolagus imperialis and P. apricenicus - huge endemic pika species. P. apricenicus is smaller and found in most deposits, while P. imperialis is much larger and only known from younger deposits. (Mazza, 1987)
- Stertomys - 5 species of dormouse, among them the giant S. laticrestatus (Daams and Freudenthal, 1985) and four smaller species (Freudenthal and Martín-Suárez, 2006)
- Hattomys - 3 species of giant hamsters, among them the giant H. gargantua. (Freudenthal, 1985)

Non-endemic mammals found on the island included:

- Apodemus gorafensis - a field mouse
- A prehistoric species of Cricetus hamster (Freudenthal, 1985)
- Megacricetodon - another hamster (Freudenthal, 1985)

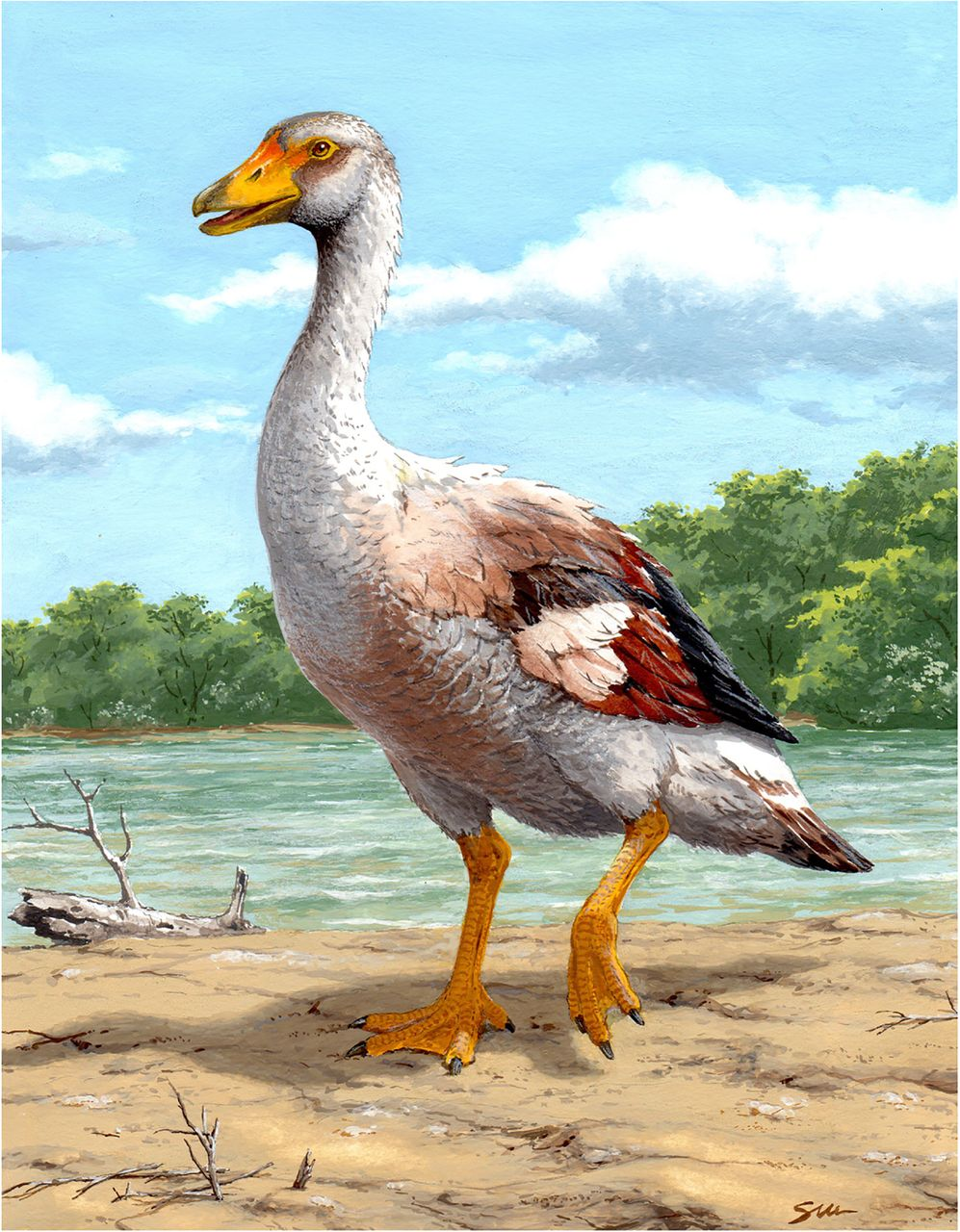
Life reconstruction of Garganornis

Bird species occurring at Gargano included (studied by Ballmann, 1973, 1976):

- Apus wetmorei, a swift.
- Columba omnisanctorum - one of the oldest pigeon fossils known. It probably was more widespread and if so, the older name C. pisana would likely apply to it.
- Garganoaetus freudenthali and Garganoaetus murivorus - two species of falconid, the former larger than a golden eagle, the latter well-sized; endemic. The smaller species, which likely is the stratigraphically oldest, is closely related to Aquila delphinensis from La Grive-Saint-Alban, France, according to Peter Ballmann in 1973. Its closest living relatives are the small eagles (Hieraaetus, Spizaetus, Lophaetus).
- Garganornis ballmanni, a flightless giant goose-like waterfowl
- "Strix" perpasta - a true owl, perhaps the same as the widespread Bubo zeylonensis lamarmorae, a paleosubspecies of the brown fish-owl (Mlíkovský 2002) but this taxon was usually known from later times.
- Tyto - 2 or 3 species of barn owls. The largest, T. gigantea, was up to twice as massive as the living eagle-owl Bubo bubo. T. robusta was also large; this species and the former were endemic but actually seem to have been chronosubspecies. The supposed remains of the smaller T. sanctialbani found at Gargano are now placed in the widespread Tyto balearica.
- An indeterminate woodpecker.

== Languages ==
According to Pellegrini, Gargano is home to area IIIb of Southern Italo-Romance varieties. Each town, in turn, speaks its own sub-variety. The Candeloro (or Candelaro in Italian) river defines the boundaries of the promontory as well as the borders with area IIb (that of Foggiano varieties).

== See also ==
- Daunia
- Tavoliere delle Puglie
- Apulia
- Garganica, the local breed of goat
- Trabucco, a giant fishing machine belonging to Gargano tradition
- 1627 Gargano earthquake

== Sources ==
- Butler, M., 1980. The giant erinaceid insectivore, Deinogalerix Freudenthal, from the upper Miocene of Gargano, Italy. Scripta Geologica 57, 1-72.
- Daams, R., Freudenthal, M. (1985): "Stertomys laticrestatus, a new glirid (dormice, Rodentia) from the insular fauna of Gargano (Prov. of Foggia, Italy)." Scripta Geologica 77: 21–27. (includes full text PDF)
- Freudenthal, M. (1972): "Deinogalerix koenigswaldi nov. gen., nov. spec., a giant insectivore from the Neogene of Italy." Scripta Geologica 14: 1-19 (includes full text PDF)
- Freudenthal, M. (1976): "Rodent stratigraphy of some Miocene fissure fillings in Gargano (prov. Foggia, Italy)". Scripta Geologica 37: 1-23 (includes full text PDF)
- Freudenthal, M. (1985) "Cricetidae (Rodentia) from the Neogene of Gargano (Prov. of Foggia, Italy)". Scripta Geologica 77: 29-76. (includes full text PDF)
- Freudenthal, M., Martín-Suárez, E. (2006): "Gliridae (Rodentia, Mammalia) from the Late Miocene Fissure Filling Biancone 1 (Gargano, Province of Foggia, Italy)." Palaeontologia Electronica 9.2.6A: 1-23.
- Leinders, J.J.M. (1984): "Hoplitomerycidae fam. nov. (Ruminantia, Mammalia) from Neogene fissure fillings in Gargano (Italy); part 1: The cranial osteology of Hoplitomeryx gen. nov. and a discussion on the classification of pecoran families". Scripta Geologica 70: 1-51, 9 plates.
- Mazza, P (1987). "Prolagus apricenicus and Prolagus imperialis: two new Ochotonids (Lagomorpha, Mammalia) of the Gargano (Southern Italy)". Bollettino della Società Paleontologica Italiana. 26 (3): 233–243.
- Mlíkovský, Jirí (2002): Cenozoic Birds of the World, Part 1: Europe: 215. Ninox Press, Prague. ISBN 80-901105-3-8 PDF fulltext
- Parra, V.; Loreau, M. & Jaeger, J.-J. (1999): "Incisor size and community structure in rodents: two tests of the role of competition". Acta Oecologica 20(2): 93-101. doi:10.1016/S1146-609X(99)80021-6 (HTML abstract)
- Van der Geer, A.A.E. (2005). "The postcranial of the deer Hoplitomeryx (Mio-Pliocene; Italy): another example of adaptive radiation on Eastern Mediterranean Islands" (PDF). Monografies de la Societat d'Història Natural de les Balears. 12: 325–336.
- Van der Geer, A.A.E. (2008). "The effect of insularity on the Eastern Mediterranean early cervoid Hoplitomeryx: the study of the forelimb" (PDF). Quaternary International. 182 (1): 145–159. Bibcode:2008QuInt.182..145V. doi:10.1016/j.quaint.2007.09.021.
- Willemsen, G.F. (1983). "Paralutra garganensis sp. nov. (Mustelidae, Lutrinae), a new otter from the Miocene of Gargano, Italy". Scripta Geologica. 72: 1–8. (includes full text PDF)
