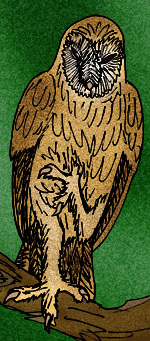

Scientific classification
- Kingdom: Animalia
- Phylum: Chordata
- Class: Aves
- Order: Strigiformes
- Family: Tytonidae
- Genus: Tyto
- Species: †T. robusta

Binomial name
- †Tyto robusta Ballmann, 1973

Synonyms
- see text

= Tyto robusta =

Tyto robusta Temporal range: Late Miocene/Early Pliocene 5.5–5 Ma

Extinct species of bird

Tyto robusta is a prehistoric species of barn-owl. It lived in what is now Monte Gargano in Italy, which was an island throughout much of the Neogene when sea levels were higher. The owl's remains date back to the Miocene-Pliocene boundary 5.5 to 5 million years ago. The fossil bones are about 60% as long again as a modern barn owl, giving a total length of about 50–65 cm for T. robusta. This owl provides an interesting case study of evolution and insular gigantism.

== Evolution, taxonomy and systematics ==
It was found sympatrically with the gigantic relative, Tyto gigantea, which at some 220% of the size of the barn owl grew to some 70–85 cm in length—larger than a Eurasian eagle-owl and maybe up to twice as heavy. Like other apex predators they can be presumed to have occurred at low population densities. Being apparently endemic to Gargano Island and perhaps some other islands in today's Apennines, where one or two huge eagles and at least at times a normal-sized barn-owl also occurred (though no large mammalian carnivores), these owls raise the question how minimum viable populations could be maintained long enough for them to live and prosper.

It is extremely commonplace for larger predatory birds such as Falconiformes and Strigiformes to evolve differently-sized sexes. Namely, the females being considerably larger with little or no overlap in size between sexes. This allows them to hunt for different-sized prey, allowing a larger, more resilient population to live off a land. But this was apparently not the case here, as there is a reasonably large sample of bones of each of the 3 owl taxa to display the natural and sexual variation within each.

In the oldest fossil samples, no giant owls were found to accompany them, whereas the latest seemed to a range of owls attributed to all 3 species. The small owls supposedly were replaced by or evolved into T. robusta from some point onwards, and T. gigantea appeared later, supposedly alongside it as well as a recolonization by Continental European stock. That this was by no means a very parsimonious assumption was already noted in the original descriptions of the remains assigned to T. robusta:

"If one assumes that the large barn-owls on Gargano would have arisen from multiple colonizations [...], T. robusta would have to be separated into two distinct species. The medium-sized form of the first colonist cannot be the same as the middle-sized form of the second colonist. As there are no morphological findings to support this assumption, it was refrained from separating [the T. robusta material into] two species. In how far one can actually expect morphological differences in forms so closely related is debatable."

More recently, it was noted that the smaller barn-owl of Gargano was not Tyto sanctialbani, which inhabited Europe north of the Alps in the latter Miocene, but its Mediterranean relative Tyto balearica, which was a sister species or chronospecies of or a southward divergence from T. sanctialbani and decidedly more robust. In addition, it appeared as if the Tyto of the youngest samples fell into 2, not 3 size groups.

Presumably, the island was initially colonized by T. balearica whose core range eventually extended from the Apennines westwards to Iberia; they might have become cut off from the main population when the Mediterranean reflooded at the end of the Messinian salinity crisis 6 million years ago. The entire population evolved into larger T. robusta, which were still close enough in size to exclude T. balearica from maintaining a constant presence alongside the larger owls. By and by, much of the fauna of Gargano Island, in a dramatic case of evolution according to Cope's Rule, became larger and larger; the barn-owls were not an exception as there was larger and larger prey accessible only to large individuals of each successive generation.

According to the revised theory, T. robusta had entirely evolved into T. gigantea eventually, and the prey preferences of these were so that the plentiful smaller mammals were again less intensely preyed upon, permitting a resident population of the now well-distinct T. balearica to recolonize Gargano Island. The remains initially presumed to be "late" T. robusta would actually be large T. balearica. Jirí Mlíkovský who proposed this solution does not use paleosubspecies in his taxonomic treatments and synonymized T. robusta with T. gigantea. But the former was actually described a few pages before the latter in the same work, and thus the synonymy would be the other way around. In any case, if these owls are considered paleosubspecies, the largest and latest form would be called Tyto robusta gigantea.

However, with more material having become available in the last few years, it is possible to better determine which individual bone belonged to what owl taxon, and it seems as if the giant barn-owls may indeed be separable as distinct species; the possibility of only a single large to huge population with marked sexual dimorphism existing at any one time cannot be fully excluded though. Identification of the small barn owl species as T. balearica and not T. sanctialbani was confirmed on the other hand.

== Ecology ==
The fossil owl bones are of Gargano are found in terra rossa (red earth) paleokarst infills. As the global climate moved towards the start of the last ice age period, it was not too dissimilar from today, albeit a bit warmer and more humid. Conditions must have been more extreme in the Mediterranean basin though, as the region had been drastically affected by the Messinian Salinity Crisis. In any case, the Gargano giant barn-owls must have lived in habitat not too different from that of the Caribbean giant barn-owls of the Quaternary: semihumid to semiarid—perhaps seasonally arid—open country tending to karstic, and vegetated mainly with shrubs and small trees, perhaps dotted with copses of larger trees. The owls would probably have sought sheltered places to roost during the day, but for nesting barn-owls prefer crevices or hollows, and those of sufficient size would probably have been more plentiful in the broken ground than in the smallish trees of the region. Like some barn-owls today, the huge forms of Gargano Island might thus have been ground-nesters.

These owls would have ruled Gargano's nightly skies; at daytime the no less impressive Garganoaetus eagles took over. As the larger land animals of Gargano Island are impressively well-known, it is possible to give a quite comprehensive list of the animals the giant owls ate even in the absence of fossil owl pellets providing direct evidence. Available prey included:

- Deinogalerix—"hairy hedgehogs" that ranged from weasel- to dog-sized. The giant D. koenigswaldi with a skull of c.20 cm length could still have been preyed upon by the largest barn-owl females, though probably not on a regular basis as being the terrestrial apex predator it was a fierce animal and not easily subdued.
- Smaller species of the Hoplitomeryx—"prongdeer", five-horned sabre-toothed even-toed ungulates. Barn-owls generally do not feed on carrion, their beak and head shapes being ill-suited for tearing apart prey too large to manipulate with their feet also. Thus the red deer-sized largest Hoplitomeryx do not seem to have been part of the giant owls' prey.
- Paralutra garganensis—a species of otter endemic to Gargano Island.
- Prolagus imperialis and P. apricenicus—huge pikas endemic to Gagano Island.
- Stertomys laticrestatus—a dormouse of large size. Apparently a monotypic genus.
- Hattomys—3 species of giant hamster, at least some of which probably also occurred elsewhere.

In addition, the smaller rodents (Mikrotia spp. and Apodemus gorafensis mice and a Cricetus hamster) might have been taken on occasion (or preferably by T. robusta, whatever its taxonomic and systematic status). It is unlikely that ponderous owls on an island abundant in mammalian prey would evolve good bird-hunting skills, but theoretically the local pigeons (Columba omnisanctorum or C. pisana) as well as the smaller Tyto balearica might have been possible prey also.
