= Manus Island spiny rat =

Conservation status
- Critically endangered, possibly extinct (IUCN 3.1)

Scientific classification
- Kingdom: Animalia
- Phylum: Chordata
- Class: Mammalia
- Order: Rodentia
- Family: Muridae
- Genus: Rattus
- Species: R. detentus

Binomial name
- Rattus detentus Timm, Weijola, Aplin, Flannery & Pine, 2016
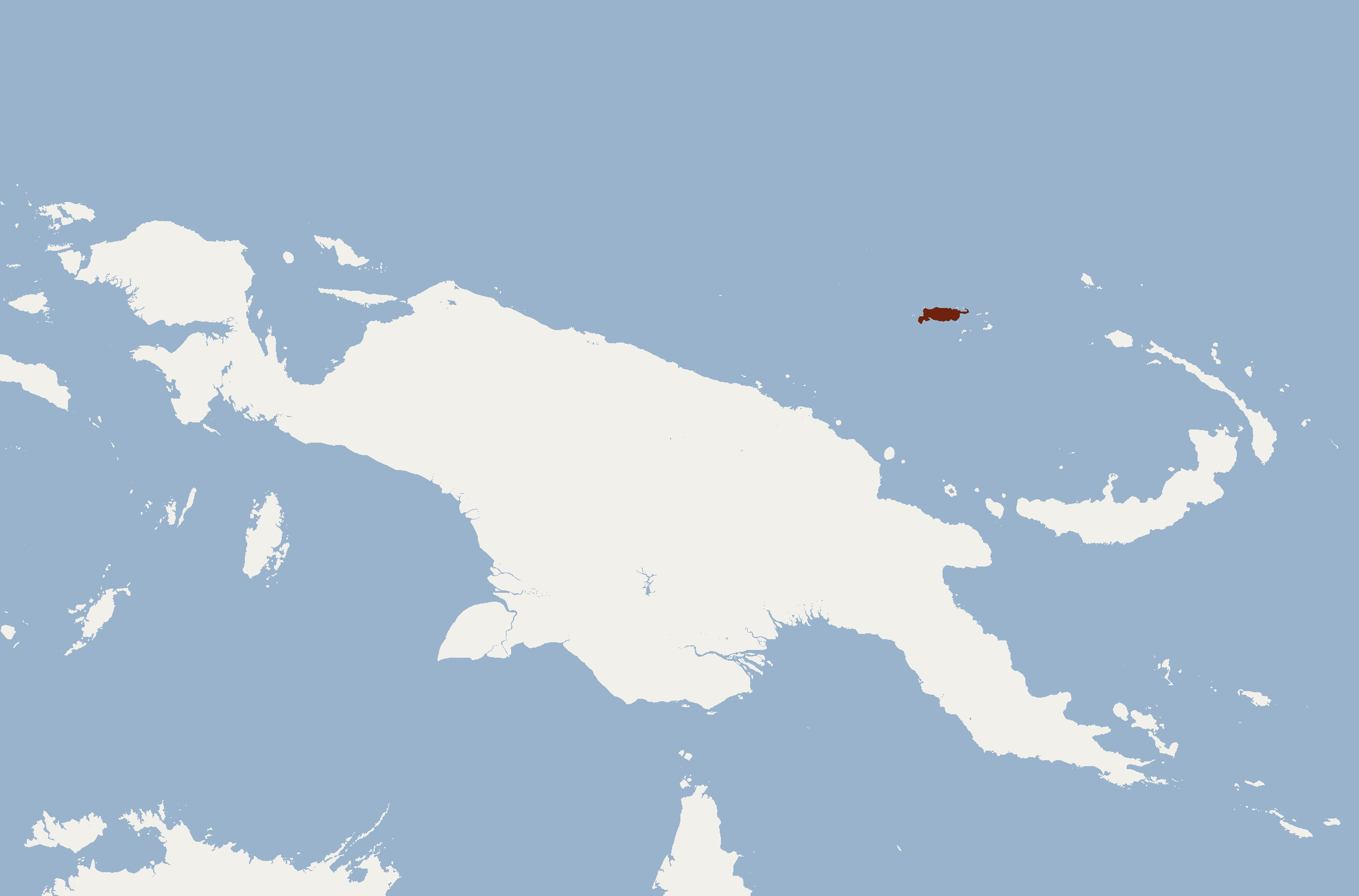

Species of rodent

The Manus Island spiny rat or Admiralty rat, (Rattus detentus) is a species of rodent in the family Muridae. It is endemic to Manus Island in Papua New Guinea, and potentially the neighboring island of Los Negros.

It was given its name after the Latin word for "detained" in reference to its isolation on the island and in a show of solidarity to the detainees at the then-open Manus Regional Processing Centre.

It is notable for its large size, being larger than any other Rattus found across the Melanesian archipelago, and may be an example of island gigantism. It is thought to be highly divergent member of the Austro-Papuan Rattus radiation and thus no close relatives are known.

This species is thought to be threatened by deforestation for logging and agriculture, as well as invasive species such as feral cats. A significant portion of Manus Island has been deforested since the 1990s. However, local residents have claimed that the species is widespread in Manus and also occurs on Los Negros Island, and the localities this species was captured at indicate that it may have some resilience to human impacts. However, the lack of detections of this species in recent surveys indicate that it occurs at low densities and is not universally common; thus it is classified as Critically Endangered (Possibly extinct) by the IUCN Red List.
