= Peromyscus nesodytes =

Peromyscus nesodytes Temporal range: Late Pleistocene- Early Holocene

Scientific classification
- Kingdom: Animalia
- Phylum: Chordata
- Class: Mammalia
- Infraclass: Placentalia
- Order: Rodentia
- Family: Cricetidae
- Subfamily: Neotominae
- Genus: Peromyscus
- Species: †P. nesodytes

Binomial name
- †Peromyscus nesodytes Wilson 1936

Extinct species of rodent

The giant island deer mouse (Peromyscus nesodytes) is believed to have become extinct approximately 8,000 years BP and lived during the late Pleistocene on California’s Channel Islands. The giant island deer mice were about 35% larger than the current-day eastern deer mouse.

== Overview ==
In 1934, Robert W. Wilson designated P. nesodytes as a new species after discovering a mouse bone (a right ramus of the mandible). He writes, “The outstanding character of P. nesodytes is its large size, which is greater than any living species of Peromyscus native to the United States.” The only larger mice known are the extant mice of the genus Megadontomys found in Mexico and Central America.

The mouse “generally considered ancestral to P. nesodytes” is Peromyscus anyapahensis.P. anyapahensis is also extinct; it is smaller in body size than P. nesodytes.

The extreme size of P. nesodytes follows Foster's rule of insular gigantism and dwarfism, in which some rodent species attain greater body size following their occupation of islands lacking a multitude of predators.

== Habitat ==
The habitat of P. nesodytes was confined to the northern Channel Islands. Remains of P. nesodytes have been found on San Miguel Island and Santa Rosa Island. The northern Channel Islands once comprised a “super-island” called Santa Rosae; increased sea levels have separated the islands for thousands of years.

== Extinction ==
P. nesodytes probably became extinct following the possibly accidental introduction of a smaller mouse, Peromyscus maniculatus, by the Chumash people, who originate from the Santa Barbara area. The Chumash traded on the northern Channel Islands and could have been unknowing transporters of P. maniculatus to the islands. It has been noted that, on occasion, individuals of P. maniculatus could have secreted themselves in baskets of food and been unintentionally conveyed by boat to the islands for trading purposes.

P. maniculatus probably fared better at avoiding the most frequent mouse predator on the islands, the barn owl, than did P. nesodytes. A possible example of this appears in Daisy Cave, an archaeological site on San Miguel Island. Cave floor layers show fewer P. maniculatus remains in the older, deeper levels than in the newer, upper levels. Barn owls may have preferentially preyed on the larger species, P. nesodytes, rather than on the smaller P. maniculatus.
