= Foster's rule =

Ecogeographical rule in evolutionary biology

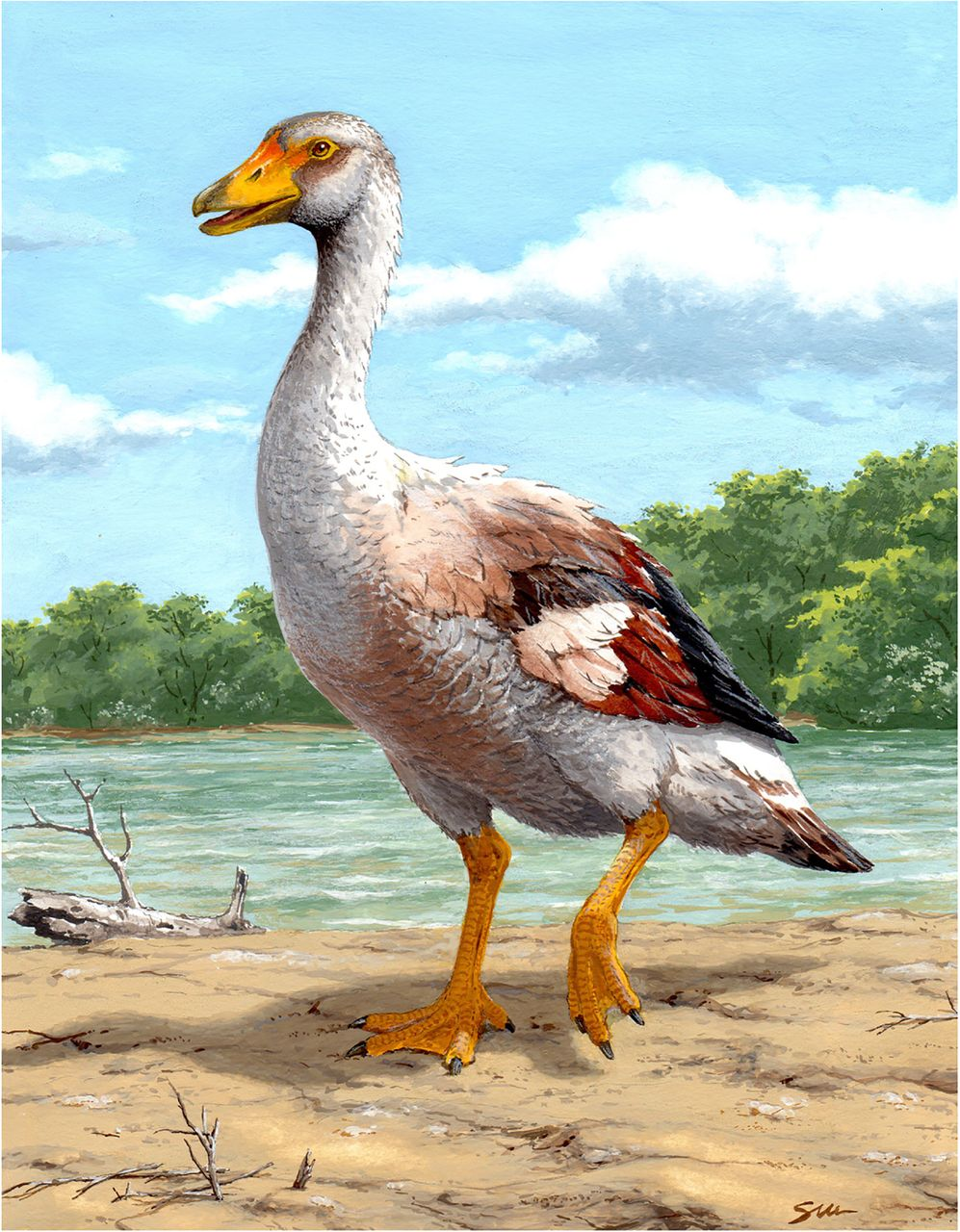
Garganornis ballmanni, a very large fossil goose from the Gargano and Scontrone islands of the Late Miocene

Foster's rule, also known as the island rule or the island effect, is an ecogeographical rule in evolutionary biology stating that members of a species get smaller or bigger depending on the resources available in the environment. For example, it is known that pygmy mammoths evolved from normal mammoths on small islands. Similar evolutionary paths have been observed in elephants, hippopotamuses, boas, sloths, deer (such as Key deer) and humans. It is part of the more general phenomenon of island syndrome which describes the differences in morphology, ecology, physiology and behaviour of insular species compared to their continental counterparts.

The rule was first formulated by Leigh Van Valen in 1973 based on the study by mammalogist J. Bristol Foster in 1964. In it, Foster compared 116 island species to their mainland varieties. Foster proposed that certain island creatures evolved larger body size (insular gigantism) while others became smaller (insular dwarfism). Foster proposed the simple explanation that smaller creatures get larger when predation pressure is relaxed because of the absence of some of the predators of the mainland, and larger creatures become smaller when food resources are limited because of land area constraints.

The idea was expanded upon in The Theory of Island Biogeography, by Robert MacArthur and Edward O. Wilson. In 1978, Ted J. Case published a longer paper on the topic in the journal Ecology.

Recent literature has also applied the island rule to plants.

There are some cases that do not neatly fit the rule; for example, artiodactyls have on several islands evolved into both dwarf and giant forms.

The Island Rule is a contested topic in evolutionary biology. Some argue that, since body size is a trait that is affected by multiple factors, and not just by organisms moving to an island, genetic variations across all populations could also cause the body mass differences between mainland and island populations.
