= Scripta Geologica =

- Discipline: Paleontology
- Language: English

Publication details
- Former names: Sammlungen des geologischen Reichsmuseums in Leiden, Leidsche Geologische Mededelingen
- History: 1881-present
- Publisher: National Museum of Natural History (Naturalis) (Netherlands)
- Frequency: Biannually
- Open access: Since 2007
- License: Creative Commons Attribution 3.0

Standard abbreviations
- ISO 4: Scr. Geol.

Indexing
- CODEN: SCGLA5
- ISSN: 0375-7587 (print); 1876-2077 (web)
- LCCN: 89650041
- OCLC no.: 212327271

Links
- Online access; Online access to special issues

Scripta Geologica is a peer-reviewed scientific journal that publishes on vertebrate and invertebrate palaeontology, palaeobotany/palynology, stratigraphy, petrology, and mineralogy, including gemmology with a focus on systematics. It is published by the Dutch National Museum of Natural History, Naturalis.

Scripta Geologica was established in 1881 as Sammlungen des geologischen Reichsmuseums in Leiden (1881-1923), changing its title to Leidse Geologische Mededelingen in 1925 (originally spelled as Leidsche Geologische Mededeelingen). From 1971, the latter title was published in parallel with Scripta Geologica until they were merged in 1985.

== Abstracting and indexing ==
Scripta Geologica is abstracted and indexed in PASCAL, GeoBase, GeoAbstracts and GeoRef.
