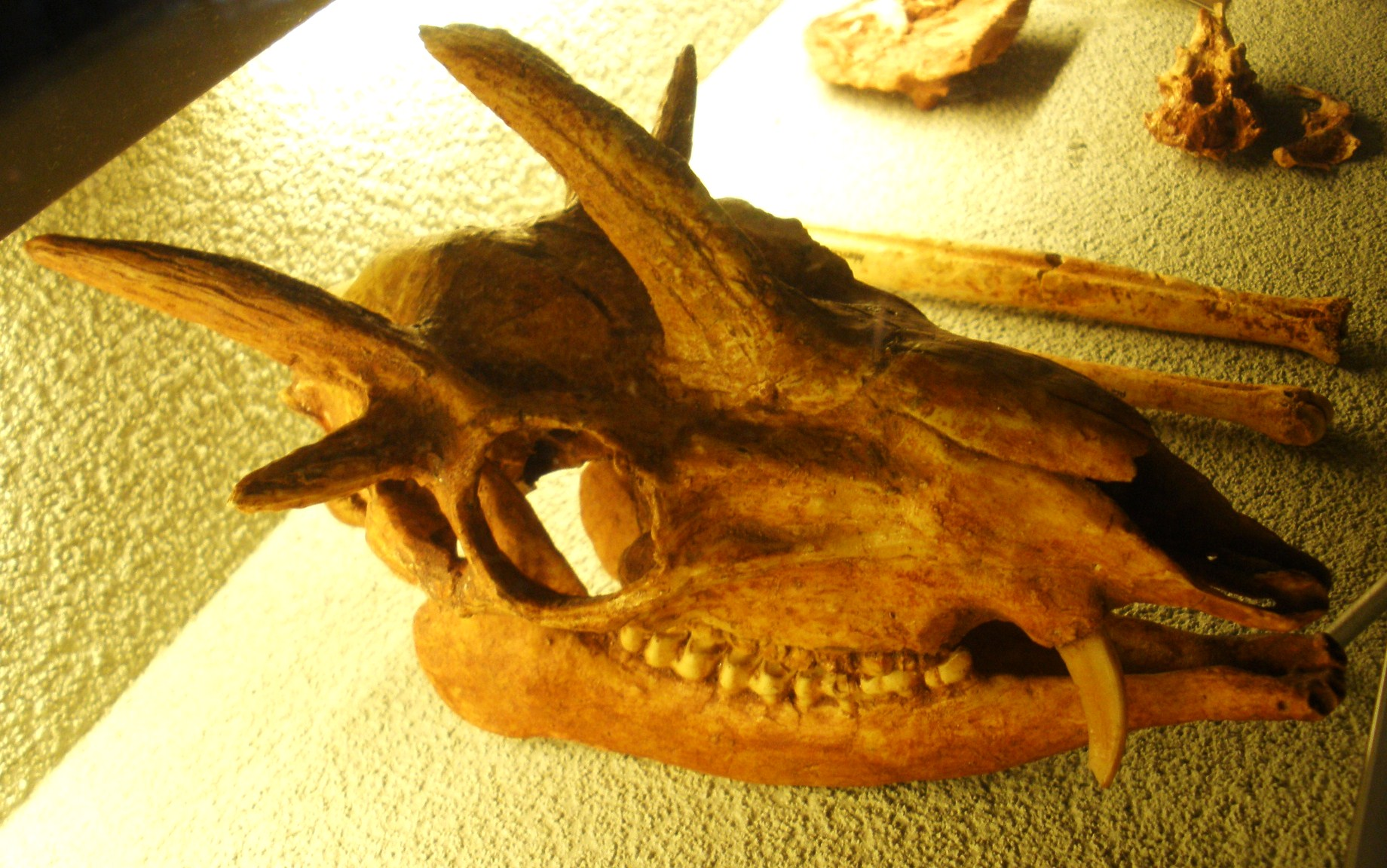
- Cast of the holotype of H. matthei, Naturalis, National Natural History Museum, Leiden, the Netherlands

Scientific classification
- Kingdom: Animalia
- Phylum: Chordata
- Class: Mammalia
- Order: Artiodactyla
- Family: †Hoplitomerycidae
- Genus: †Hoplitomeryx; Leinders, 1984

Species
- †H. matthei Leinders, 1984; †H. apruthiensis Mazza & Rustioni, 2011; †H. apulicus Mazza & Rustioni, 2011; †H. falcidens Mazza & Rustioni, 2011; †H. magnus Mazza & Rustioni, 2011; †H. minutus Mazza & Rustioni, 2011

= Hoplitomeryx =

Hoplitomeryx Temporal range: Late Miocene–Early Pliocene

Extinct genus of deer

Hoplitomeryx is a genus of extinct deer-like ruminants which lived on the former Gargano Island during the Miocene and the Early Pliocene, now a peninsula on the east coast of Southern Italy. Hoplitomeryx, also known as "prongdeer", had five horns and sabre-like upper canines similar to a modern musk deer.

Its fossilized remains were retrieved from the late 1960s onwards from reworked reddish, massive or crudely stratified silty-sandy clays (terrae rossae), which partially fill the paleo-karstic fissures in the Mesozoic limestone substrate and that are on their turn overlain by Late Pliocene-Early Pleistocene sediments of a subsequently marine, shallow water and terrigenous origin. In this way a buried paleokarst originated.

The fauna from the paleokarst fillings is known as Mikrotia fauna after the endemic murid of the region (initially named "Microtia", with a c, but later corrected, because the genus Microtia was already occupied). Later, after the regression and continentalization of the area, a second karstic cycle started in the late Early Pleistocene, the neokarst, which removed part of the paleokarst fill.

== Description ==
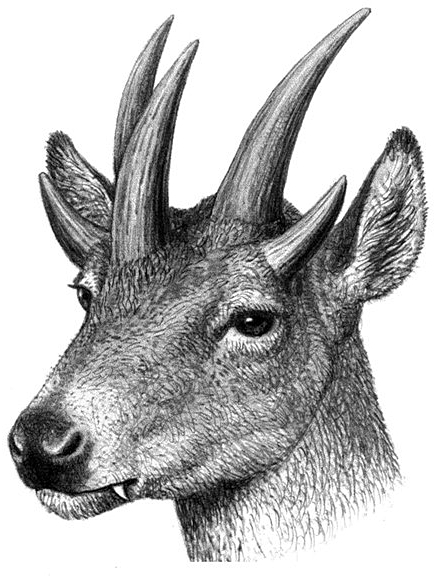
Life reconstruction of Hoplitomeryx by Mauricio Antón.

Hoplitomeryx was a small ruminant characterized by the presence of five horns, two in pairs above each orbit and one on the nasal bone, and of elongated canines similar to those of musk deer. Its skull is also characterized by a complete fusion of the navicocuboid with the metatarsal, a distally closed metatarsal gully, and a non-parallel-sided astragalus, Its post-cranial anatomy is characterized by an elongated patella.

== Species ==
The Hoplitomeryx skeletal material forms a heterogeneous group, containing four size groups from tiny to huge; within the size groups different morphotypes may be present. All size groups share the same typical Hoplitomeryx features. The different size groups are equally distributed over the excavated fissures, and are therefore not to be considered chronotypes. The hypothesis of an archipelago consisting of different islands each with its own morphotype cannot be confirmed so far. The small specimens show insular dwarfism, but this cannot be said for the medium and huge specimens.

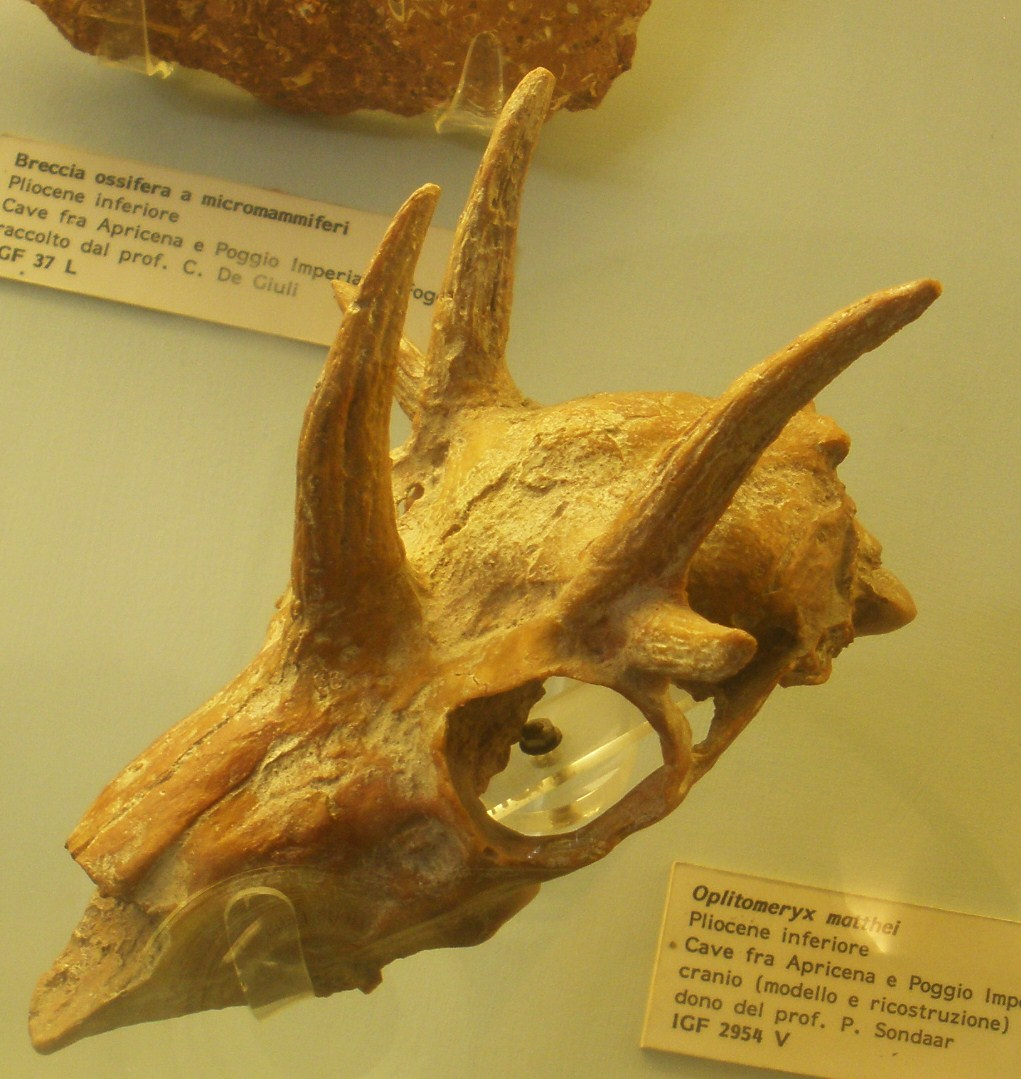
Skull

The situation with several co-existing morphotypes on an island is paralleled by Candiacervus (Pleistocene, Crete, Greece). Opinions about its taxonomy differ, and at present two models prevail: one genus for eight morphotypes, or alternatively, two genera for five species. The second model is based upon limb proportions only, but these are invalid taxonomic features for island endemics, as they change under influence of environmental factors that differ from the mainland. Also in Hoplitomeryx the morphotypes differ in limb proportions, but here different ancestors are unlikely, because in that case they all ancestors must have shared the typical hoplitomerycid features. In Candiacervus as well as in Hoplitomeryx, the largest species is as tall as an elk, but gracile and slender.

The large variation is instead explained as an example of adaptive radiation, starting when the Oligocene ancestor colonized the island. The range of empty niches promoted its radiation into several trophic types, yielding a differentiation in Hoplitomeryx. The shared lack of large mammalian predators and the limited amount of food in all niches promoted the development of derived features in all size groups (apomorphies).

== Taxonomy ==
The affinities of Hoplitomeryx have long been contentious, due to its unique morphology not closely resembling any living ruminant group. Following their discovery in the 1980s, the Hoplitomerycids were considered to be relatives of Cervidae (deer), possibly as descendants of the early Miocene genus Amphiomoschus or of the late Miocene Micromeryx, and potentially forming a sister taxon to cervids as a whole However, analysis of the horn cores show that they more closely resemble those of bovids (bovines, antelopes), an affinity also supported by their inner ear anatomy, which resembles those of bovids, and by similarities of brain morphology between Hoplitomeryx and bovids.
