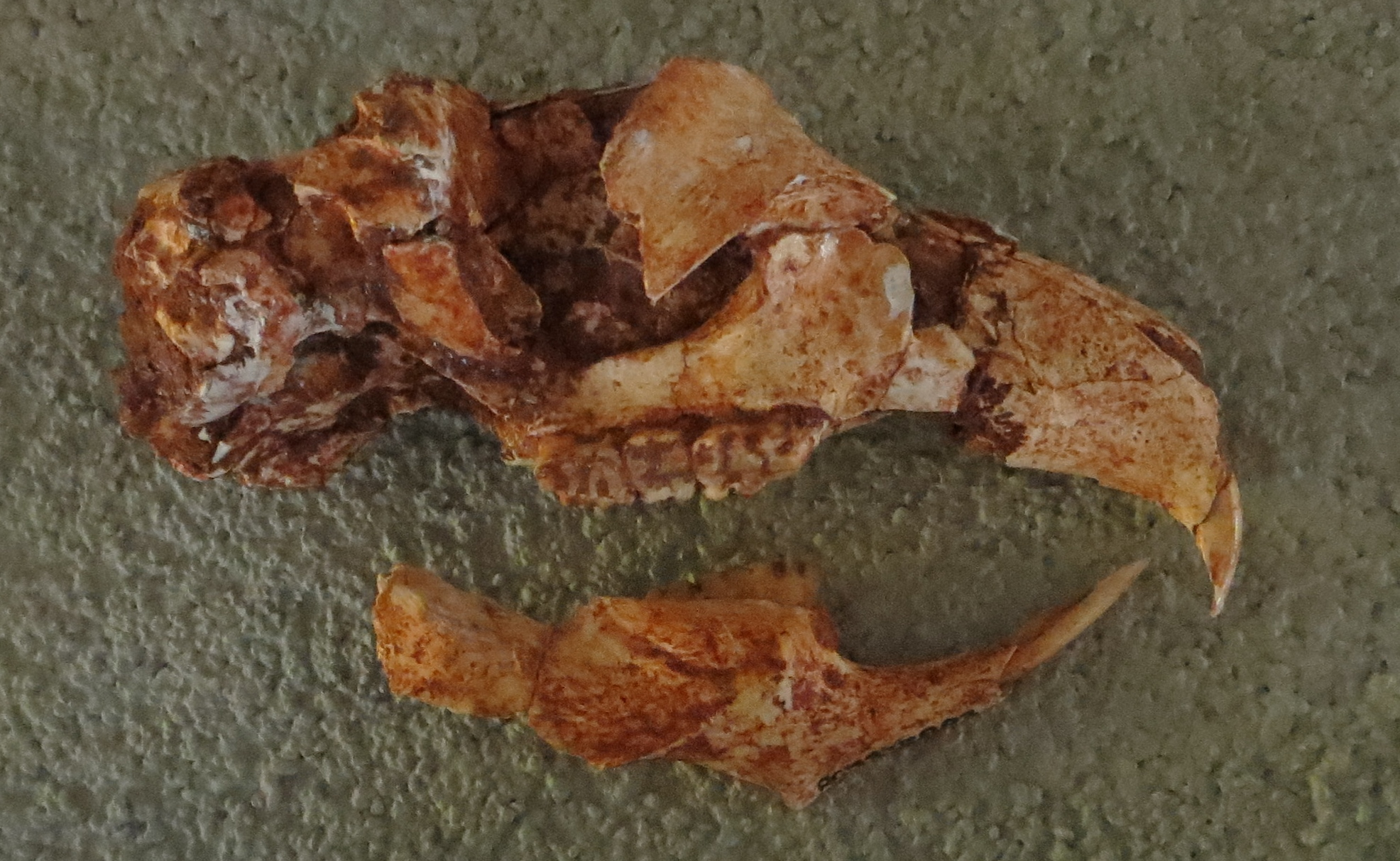
- Complete skull of M. magna
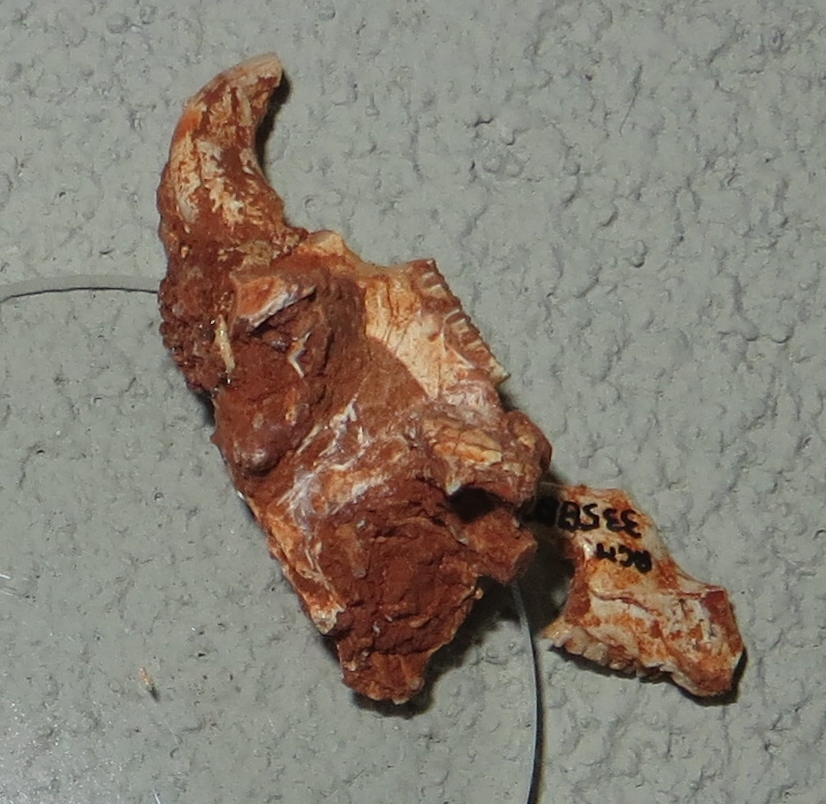
- Mandible of Mikrotia sp.

Scientific classification
- Kingdom: Animalia
- Phylum: Chordata
- Class: Mammalia
- Order: Rodentia
- Family: Muridae
- Subfamily: Murinae
- Genus: †Mikrotia; Freudenthal, 2006

Species
- †M. magna Freudenthal, 1976 (type species); †M. maiuscula Freudenthal, 1976; †M. parva Freudenthal, 1976

Synonyms
- Microtia Freudenthal, 1976 (preoccupied)

= Mikrotia =

Mikrotia Temporal range: Late Miocene, 11.63–5 Ma

Extinct genus of rodents

Mikrotia is an extinct rodent belonging to the Muridae. It lived during the upper Miocene (about 11.63 - 5 million years ago) and its fossil remains have been found in Italy (Gargano). The type species is M. magna, although two other species (M. maiuscula and M. parka) are also known.

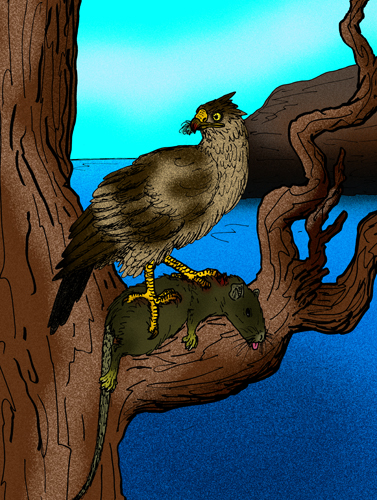
Garganoaetus freudenthali preying on a Mikrotia sp.

== Description ==
This animal, despite belonging to the Muridae, was much larger in size than its modern equivalents. The only known skull of the largest species, Mikrotia magna, was about 10 centimetres (3.9 in) long. The three known species of the genus Mikrotia show an evolutionary tendency towards the development of hypsodontal molars (with a high crown) and in the increase of the number of dental lobes in the first lower molar (as happened later to modern voles). The oldest specimens of the genus were still characterized by a dental pattern typical of murids, consisting of a succession of three parallel rows of cusps. However, an additional lobe was already present in the anterior part of the lower first molar. In a rather rapid evolutionary succession, various successive species of Mikrotia developed more and more additional lobes and increased hypsodontia. In the last and largest species, M. magna, the first lower molar had acquired a pattern totally similar to that of voles, with six rows of transverse ridges.

== Classification ==
Mikrotia is represented by three species (M. parva, M. maiuscula and M. magna), all found in the fissure deposits of Gargano. During the Miocene Gargano became an island and developed insular fauna, including large rodents. Mikrotia developed from unknown continental forms (perhaps Parapodemus, with which the older species of Mikrotia share the shape of the lower molars) and later its size increased, as did dental specializations.

Freudenthal initially described these species in the genus Microtia in 1976 (with reference to Microtus, a vole with similar teeth), but later the same scholar renamed the genus to Mikrotia in 2006, since the name Microtia was already preoccupied by a butterfly genus named in 1864.

Mikrotia, despite the affinities of the dentition with those of the arvicolines, belongs to the Muridae on the basis of cranial characteristics.
