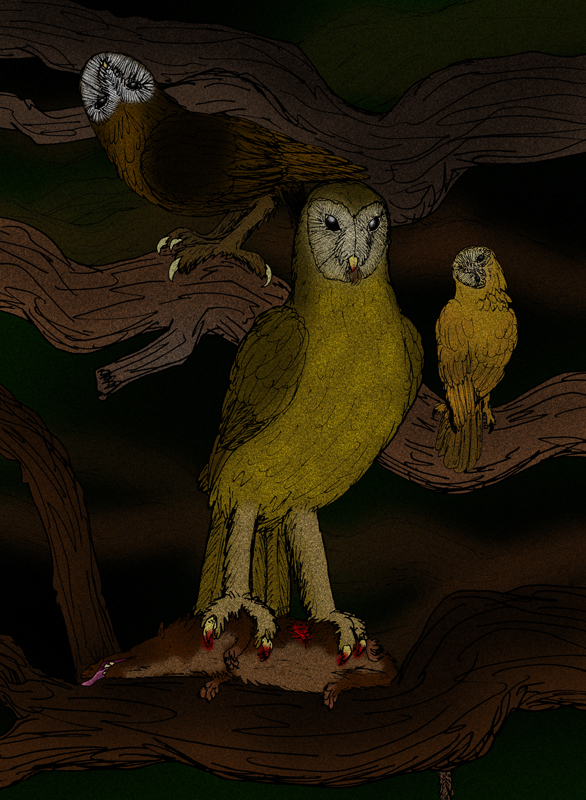
- Tyto gigantea

Scientific classification
- Kingdom: Animalia
- Phylum: Chordata
- Class: Aves
- Order: Strigiformes
- Family: Tytonidae
- Genus: Tyto
- Species: †T. gigantea

Binomial name
- †Tyto gigantea Ballmann, 1973

= Tyto gigantea =

Tyto gigantea Temporal range: Late Miocene 11.63–5.333 Ma

Extinct species of bird

Tyto gigantea is an extinct barn owl from what is now Gargano, Italy, dating back to the late Miocene. From its remains, T. gigantea is suggested to have been as large as or larger than the Eurasian eagle-owl (Bubo bubo).

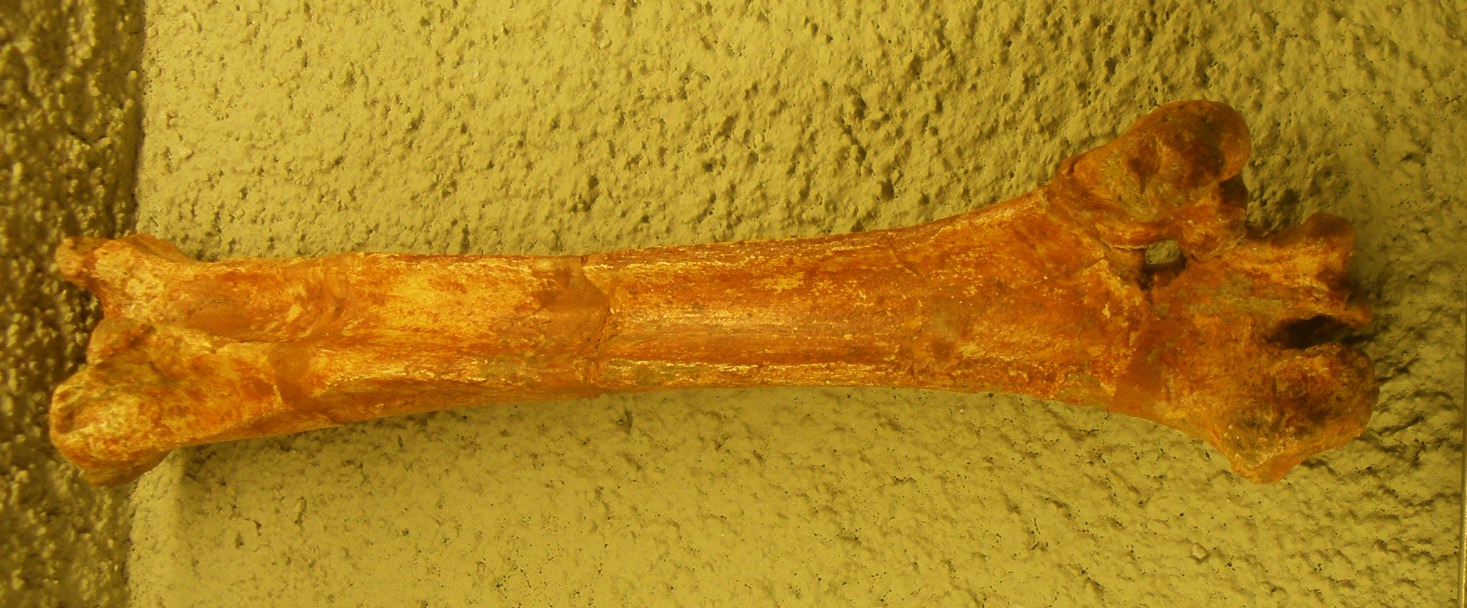
Tibiotarsus of Tyto gigantea.

This species seems to have lived at the same time as the closely related owl, Tyto robusta. That would represent a single lineage of owls adapting to the largest size of their prey on the island, such as the great erinaceomorph of Gargano, Deinogalerix, and rodents.
