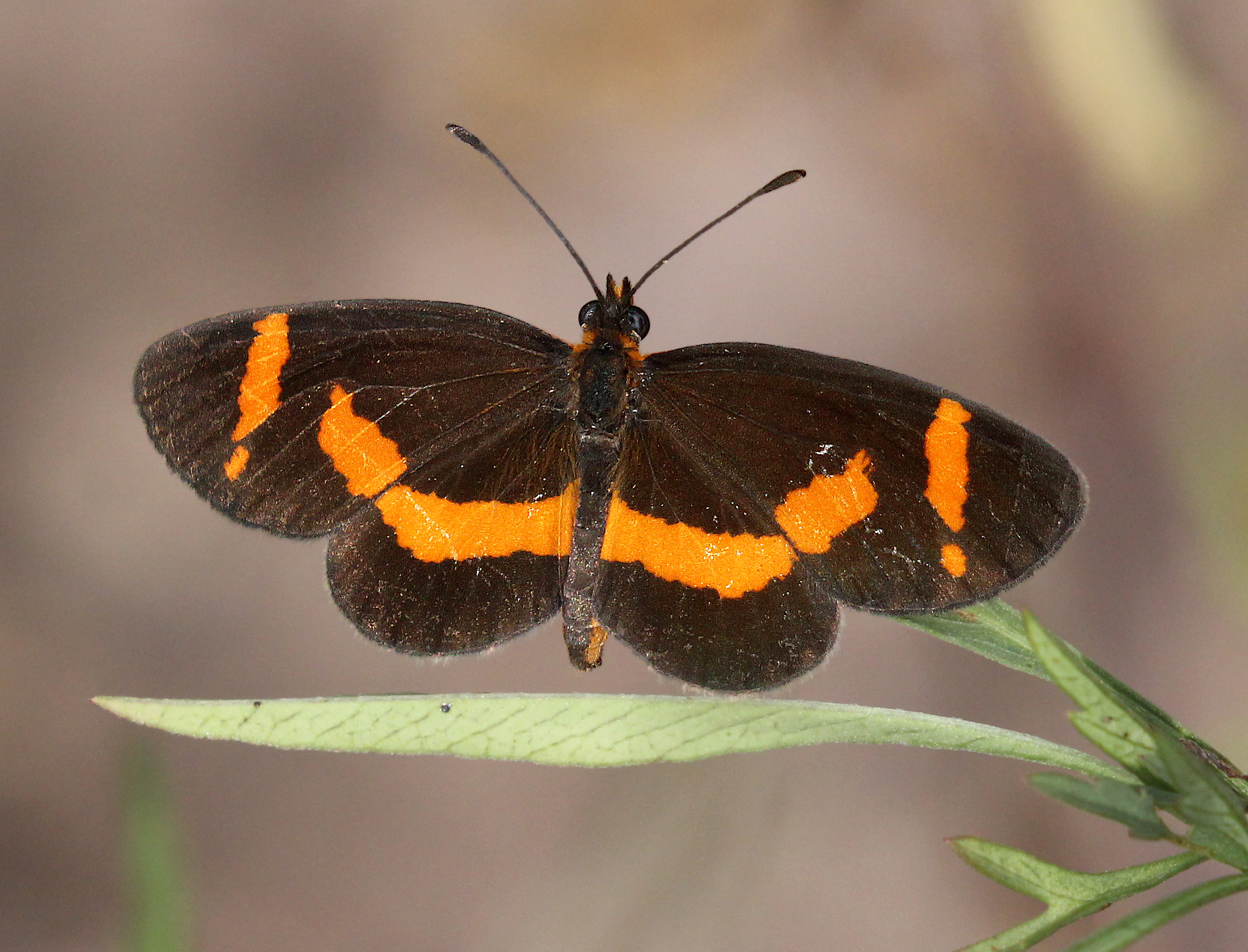

Scientific classification
- Kingdom: Animalia
- Phylum: Arthropoda
- Class: Insecta
- Order: Lepidoptera
- Family: Nymphalidae
- Subfamily: Nymphalinae
- Tribe: Melitaeini
- Subtribe: Chlosynina
- Genus: Microtia; Bates, 1864
- Species: M. elva

Binomial name
- Microtia elva Bates, 1864

Synonyms
- Microtia elva f. draudti Röber, [1914]

= Microtia (butterfly) =

Genus of butterflies

Microtia is a monotypic genus of butterflies from southern United States and Central America in the family Nymphalidae. It contains the single species Microtia elva, the elf. Larvae of this species feed on Tetramerium and other species in the family Acanthaceae.

== Subspecies ==
- Microtia elva elva (Guatemala, Nicaragua)
- Microtia elva horni Rebel, 1906 (Mexico, Oaxaca)
