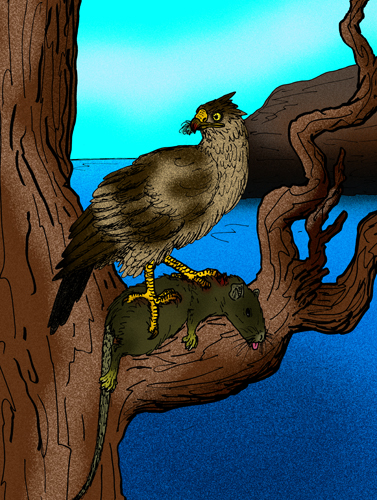
- G. freudenthali feeding on a Mikrotia sp.

Scientific classification
- Kingdom: Animalia
- Phylum: Chordata
- Class: Aves
- Order: Accipitriformes
- Family: Accipitridae
- Subfamily: Buteoninae
- Genus: †Garganoaetus; Ballmann, 1973

Species
- †Garganoaetus freudenthali †Garganoaetus murivorus

= Garganoaetus =

Garganoaetus Temporal range: Early Pliocene

Extinct genus of birds

Garganoaetus is an extinct genus of buteonin accipitrid bird of prey from the early Pliocene in Italy. G. freudenthali was comparable in size to a golden eagle and was likely an apex predator; G. murivorus was hawk sized. Species of Garganoaetus would have lived alongside other Gargano island animals that it likely preyed on, such as large dormice Stertomys and Hattomys hamsters, the giant, long-skulled Deinogalerix moonrats, an otter, Prolagus pikas, and the multi-horned artiodactyl Hoplitomeryx.
