= Scontrone =

- Comune
- Comune di Scontrone
- Location within Italy Location within Abruzzo
- Coordinates: 41°44′54″N 14°2′25″E
- Country: Italy
- Region: Abruzzo
- Province: L'Aquila (AQ)

Government
  - Mayor: Francesco Melone

Area
  - Total: 21.40 km^{2} (8.26 sq mi)
- Elevation: 1,038 m (3,406 ft)

Population (1 January 2007)
  - Total: 605
  - Density: 28.3/km^{2} (73.2/sq mi)
- Demonym: Scontronesi
- Time zone: UTC+1 (CET)
  - Summer (DST): UTC+2 (CEST)
- Postal code: 67030
- Dialing code: 0864
- Patron saint: John the Baptist
- Saint day: 24 June

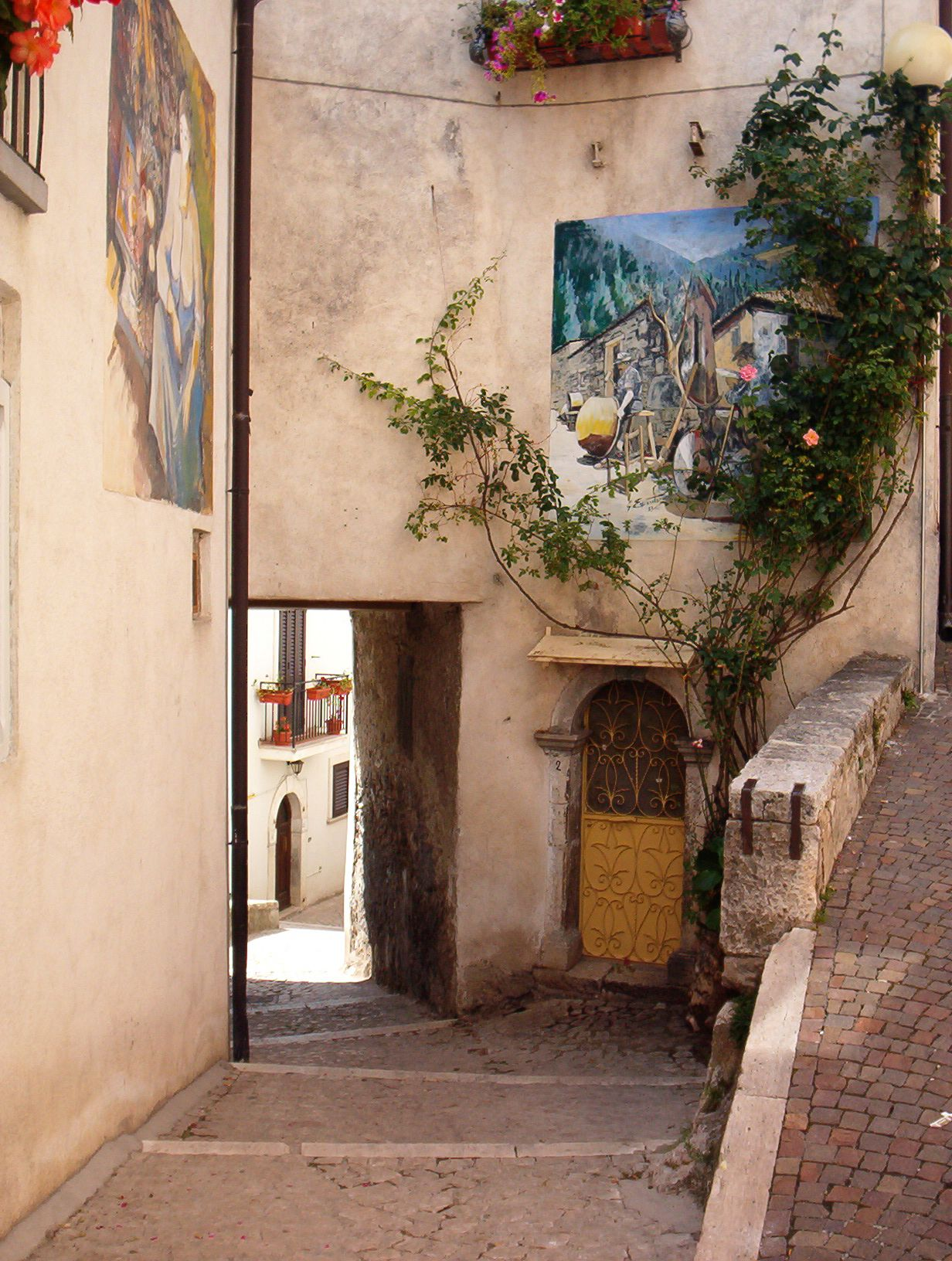

Scontrone is a comune and town in the province of L'Aquila, in the Abruzzo region of central Italy. In 2021, Poste Italiane (Italian post office) launched the service of ATM.
