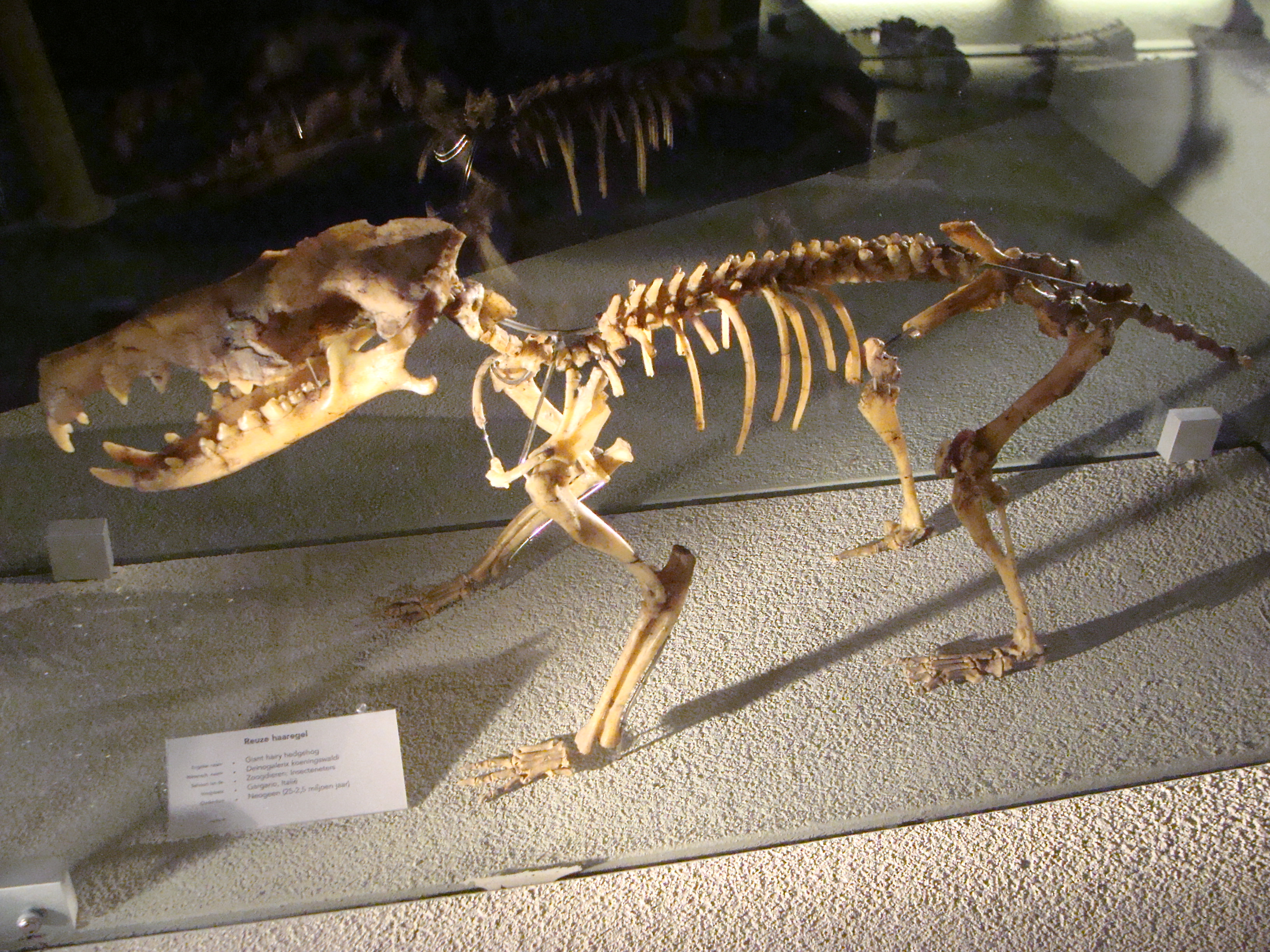
- Skeleton in Naturalis Biodiversity Center

Scientific classification
- Kingdom: Animalia
- Phylum: Chordata
- Class: Mammalia
- Order: Eulipotyphla
- Family: Erinaceidae
- Subfamily: Galericinae
- Genus: †Deinogalerix; Freudenthal, 1972

Species
- D. brevirostris; D. freudenthali; D. intermedius; D. koenigswaldi; D. minor; D. masinii; D. samniticus

= Deinogalerix =

Deinogalerix Temporal range: Late Miocene 10–5 Ma

Extinct genus of mammals

Deinogalerix (from Ancient Greek, Deinos; "terrible/terror", + Galerix) is an extinct genus of gymnure which lived in Italy in the Late Miocene, 7-10 million years ago; gymnures belong to the subfamily Galericinae of the family Erinaceidae which also contain the hedgehogs, though extant gymnures and moonrats are fully hairy, without sharp quills. Deinogalerix is thought to have also lacked quills.

The genus was endemic to what was then the island of Gargano, which is now a peninsula in southeastern Italy bounded by the Adriatic Sea. The first specimens of Deinogalerix were first described in 1972.

Deinogalerix had a long, thin, conical face, small pointed ears, a lengthy, tapering tail and long hairs.

It is believed that the species of Deinogalerix were insectivores, mostly feeding off invertebrates like beetles, dragonflies and crickets, and possibly even snails. But the larger species may also have scavenged on small mammals, reptiles and birds. D. koenigswaldi's skull was 21 centimetres (8.3 in) long and the entire body measured 60 centimetres (24 in). It occupied a similar ecological niche as dogs and cats today, predating animals smaller than itself; Deinogalerix likely shared this niche with the enormous barn owl Tyto gigantea, thought to have been sympatric.

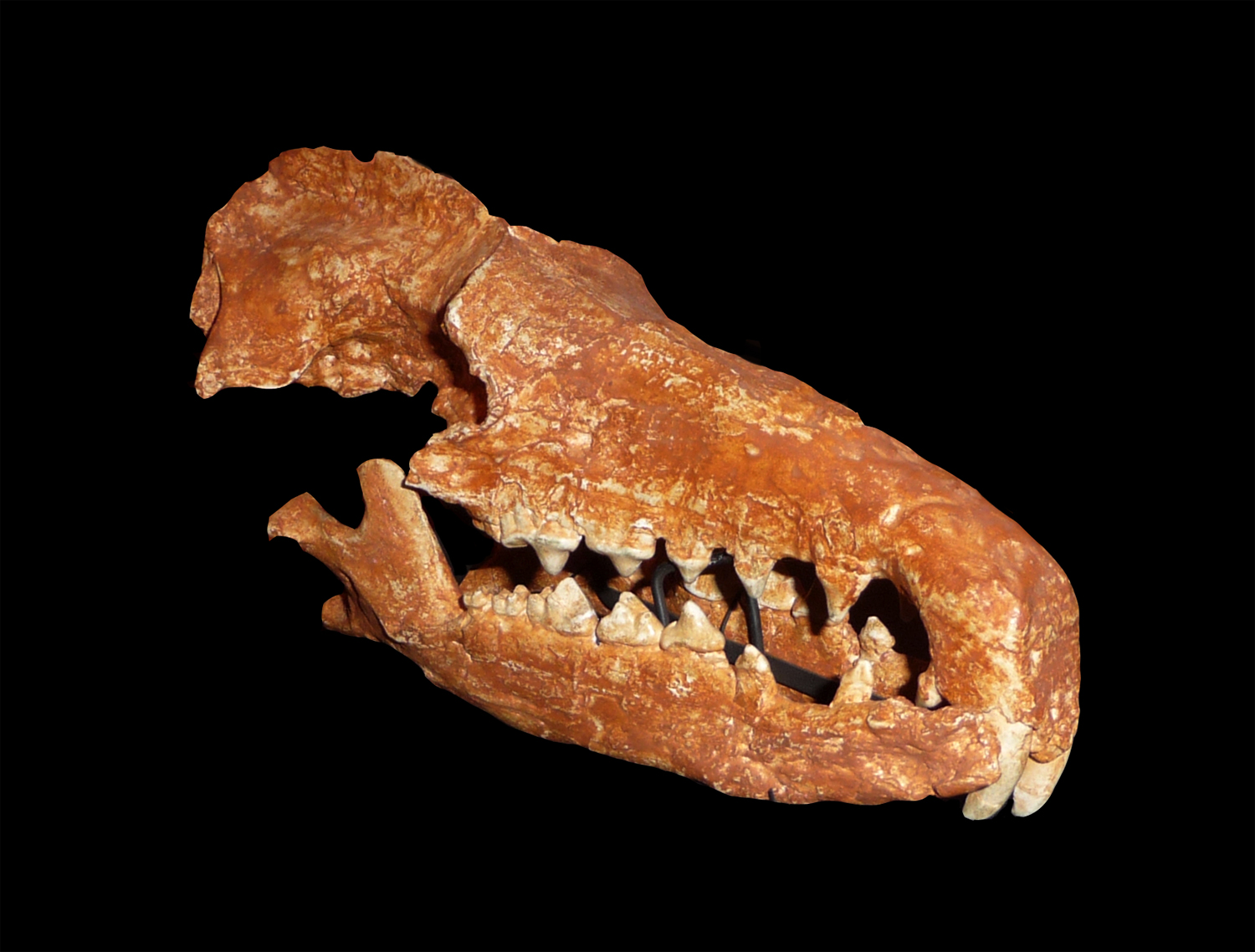
Fossil skull of D. koenigswaldi

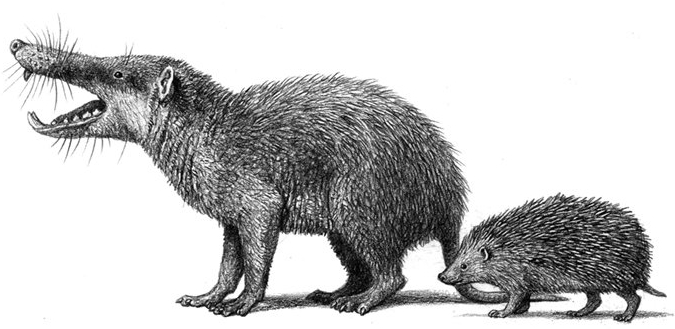
Deinogalerix in scale with a modern European hedgehog. Artwork by Mauricio Antón.
