= List of amphibians of the Canary Islands =

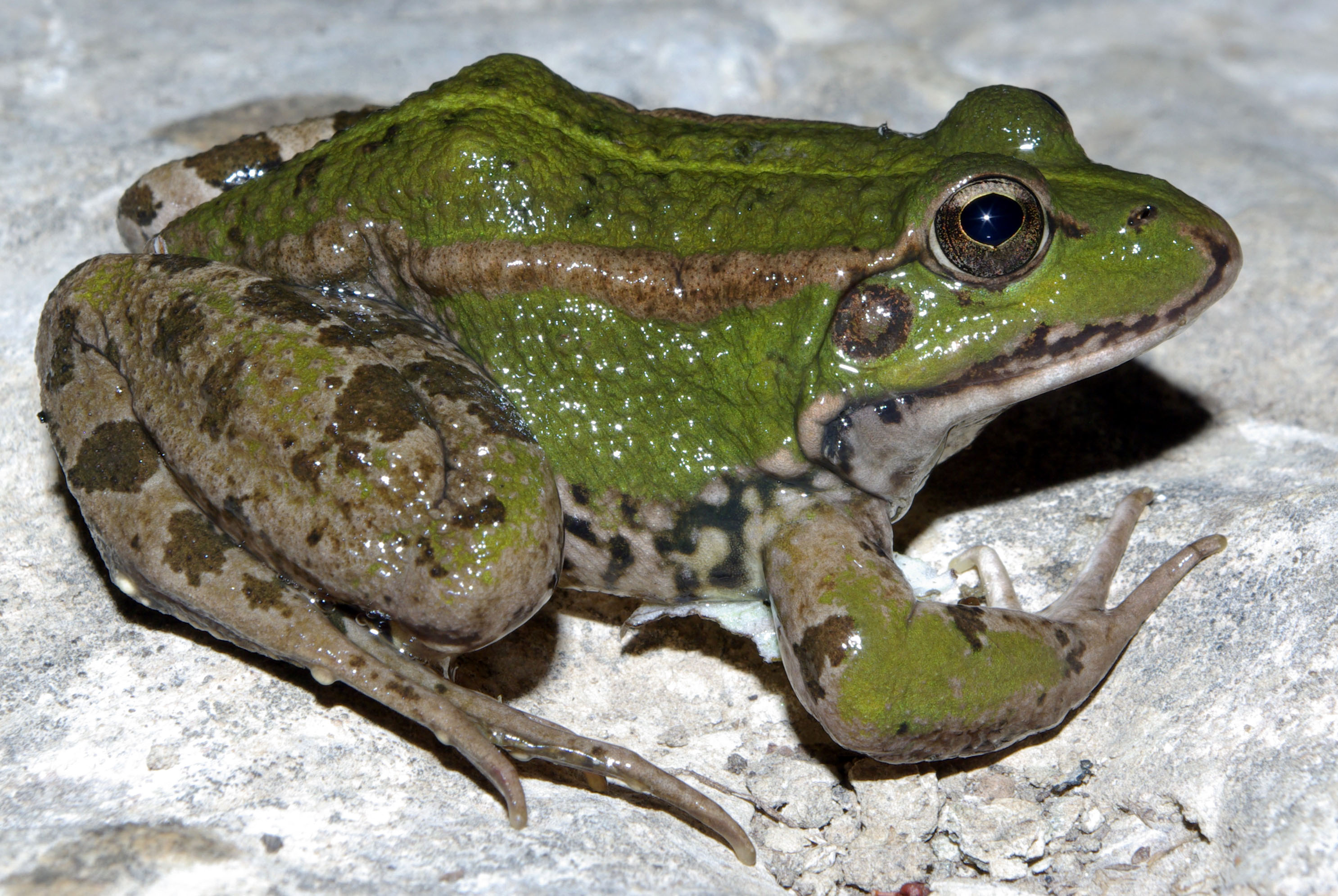
Iberian green frog.

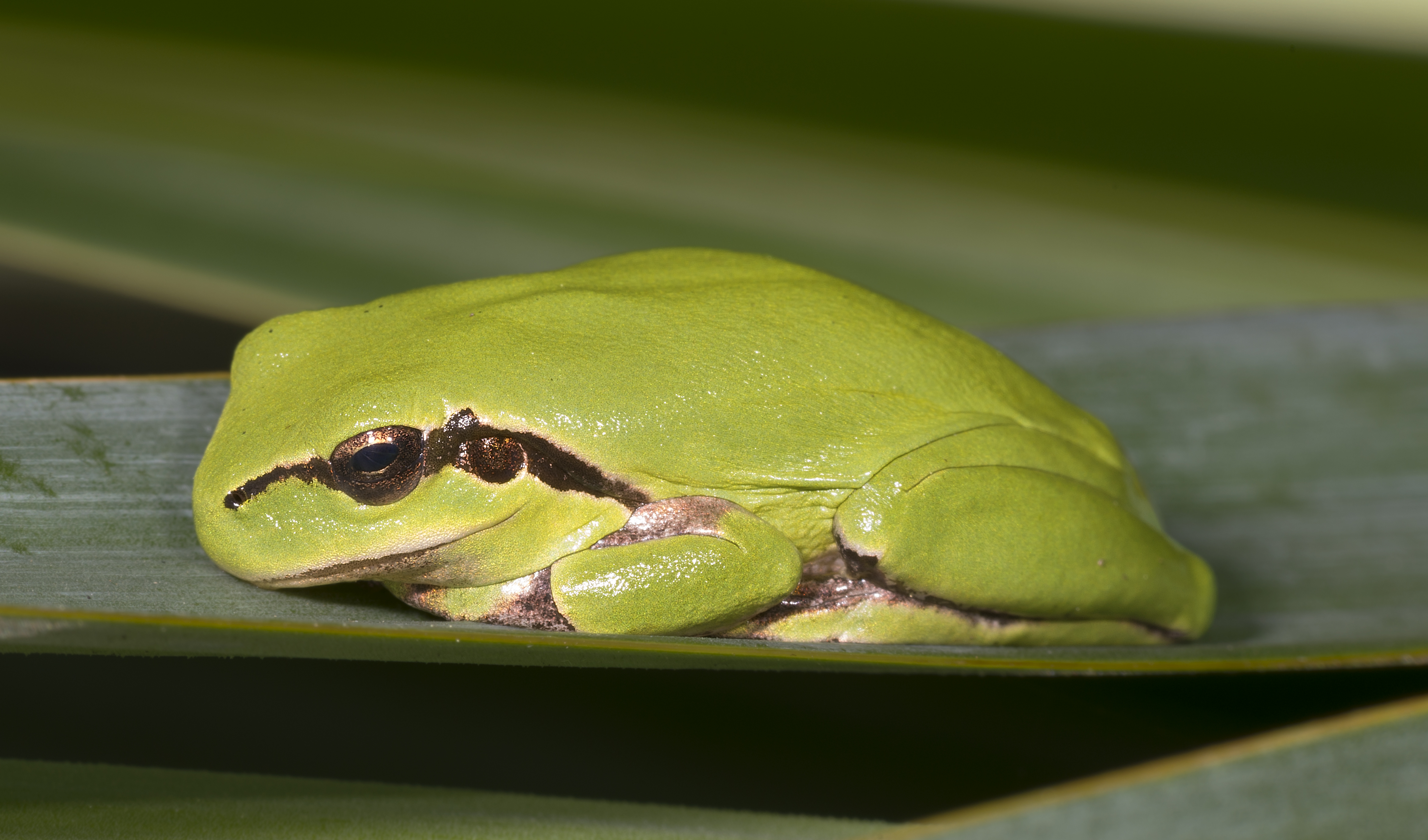
Mediterranean tree frog.

The amphibians that live in the Canary Islands consist of two species.

Both the Mediterranean tree frog and the Iberian green frog were introduced by humans in the 15th century in order to control crop pests.

Between 1985 and 2015 there was a population of the Sahara frog on Gran Canaria, which has since disappeared, but hybridization with the Iberian green frog would have been possible.

== Anura ==
=== Hylidae ===
- Mediterranean tree frog (Hyla meridionalis) LC

=== Ranidae ===
- Iberian green frog (Pelophylax perezi) LC

== See also ==
- List of mammals of the Canary Islands
- List of birds of the Canary Islands
- List of reptiles of the Canary Islands
- List of amphibians of the Azores
- List of amphibians of Madeira
- List of amphibians of Cape Verde
