= List of reptiles of the Canary Islands =

List of reptiles of the Canary Islands is an incomplete list of reptiles found in the Canary Islands. This list includes both endemic and introduced species.

EX	Extinct	No reasonable doubt that the last individual has died.
EW	Extinct in the wild	Known only to survive in captivity or as a naturalized populations well outside its previous range.
CR	Critically endangered	The species is in imminent risk of extinction in the wild.
EN	Endangered	The species is facing an extremely high risk of extinction in the wild.
VU	Vulnerable	The species is facing a high risk of extinction in the wild.
NT	Near threatened	The species does not meet any of the criteria that would categorise it as risking extinction but it is likely to do so in the future.
LC	Least concern	There are no current identifiable risks to the species.
DD	Data deficient	There is inadequate information to make an assessment of the risks to this species.

(I): Introduced

== Order: Squamata ==
=== Lizards ===
==== Infraorder Gekkota ====
===== Family Phyllodactylidae =====
- East Canary gecko, Tarentola angustimentalis LC
- Boettger's wall gecko, Tarentola boettgeri LC
- Tenerife gecko, Tarentola delalandii LC
- Gomero wall gecko, Tarentola gomerensis LC

===== Family Gekkonidae =====
- Mediterranean house gecko, Hemidactylus turcicus LC (Gran Canaria and Tenerife) (I)

==== Superfamily Lacertoidea ====
===== Family Lacertidae =====
- Atlantic lizard, Gallotia atlantica LC
- Boettger's lizard, Gallotia caesaris LC
- West Canaries lizard, Gallotia galloti LC
- El Hierro giant lizard, Gallotia simonyi CR
- La Gomera giant lizard, Gallotia bravoana CR
- Gran Canaria giant lizard, Gallotia stehlini LC
- La Palma giant lizard, Gallotia auaritae CR
- Tenerife giant lizard, Gallotia goliath EX
- Tenerife speckled lizard, Gallotia intermedia CR

==== Infraorder Scincomorpha ====
===== Family Scincidae =====
- East Canary skink, Chalcides simonyi EN
- Gran Canaria skink, Chalcides sexlineatus LC
- West Canary skink, Chalcides viridanus LC
- La Gomera skink, Chalcides coeruleopunctatus LC

==== Family Chamaeleonidae ====
- Veiled chameleon, Chamaeleo calyptratus LC (I)

=== Snakes ===
==== Suborder Serpentes ====
===== Family Typhlopidae =====
- Brahminy blind snake, Indotyphlops braminus LC (I)

===== Family Colubridae =====
- California kingsnake, Lampropeltic californiae LC (I)

== Order: Testudines ==
=== Turtles ===
==== Family Emydidae ====
- Pond slider, Trachemys scripta LC (I)
- False map turtle, Graptemys pseudogeographica LC (I)

===== Family Testudinidae =====
- Tenerife giant tortoise, Centrochelys burchardi EX
- Gran Canaria giant tortoise, Centrochelys vulcanica EX

===== Family Cheloniidae =====
- Loggerhead sea turtle, Caretta caretta EN
- Green sea turtle, Chelonia mydas EN
- Hawksbill sea turtle, Eretmochelys imbricata CR
- Kemp's ridley sea turtle, Lepidochelys kempii CR

===== Family Dermochelyidae =====
- Leatherback sea turtle, Dermochelys coriacea VU

== See also ==
- List of mammals of the Canary Islands
- List of birds of the Canary Islands
- List of amphibians of the Canary Islands
