= Giant lizard =

Giant lizards include:

- El Hierro Giant Lizard
- Giant Horned Lizard
- La Gomera Giant Lizard
- La Palma Giant Lizard
- Roque Chico de Salmor Giant Lizard
