= La Palma giant lizard =

Conservation status
- Critically endangered, possibly extinct (IUCN 3.1)

Scientific classification
- Kingdom: Animalia
- Phylum: Chordata
- Class: Reptilia
- Order: Squamata
- Family: Lacertidae
- Genus: Gallotia
- Species: G. auaritae

Binomial name
- Gallotia auaritae Mateo, García-Márquez, López Jurado & Barahona, 2001

Synonyms
- Gallotia simonyi auaritae Mateo, García-Márquez, López Jurado & Barahona, 2001

Species of lizard

The La Palma giant lizard (Gallotia auaritae) is a large wall lizard endemic to the island of La Palma in the Canary Islands. It is listed as critically endangered, but it may be extinct.

== History ==
Subfossil remains indicate that it occurred once through the island, up to 800 meters above sea level, and that its preferred habitat was xerophytic vegetation.

Though described originally from bones in 2001 and generally considered extinct, sightings and photographic evidence of a large lacertid made in 2007 north of the island could belong to this species. However, many authors consider the sightings doubtful.

== Taxonomy ==
The La Palma giant lizard was described originally as a subspecies of Simony's giant lizard (G. simonyi), but was elevated later to full species rank. Remains from La Palma previously assigned to Gallotia goliath seem to belong to this taxon instead; if this is correct, they indicate that the average size of the species has decreased over the last millennia, possibly due to humans hunting the larger lizards. The sighted La Palma giant lizard individual was slightly more than 30 cm (~1 ft) long and had an estimated age of four years. New expeditions to the area were planned in hopes of finding more individuals and possibly a breeding population.

Scientists did not have a chance to study living specimens, and present fossil and subfossil material of G. auaritae does not allow for sufficiently detailed analyses of its phylogenetic status. It likely belongs to the simonyi clade like the other giant Gallotia species from the western Canary Islands, but whether it actually was as close to G. simonyi as presumed remains unverified.

== Status ==
Its decline may have started 2000 years ago with the arrival of humans on La Palma. Until the sightings, it was believed to have become extinct in the last 500 years. The main causes of its possible extinction were believed to have been introduced cats, consumption by the original human population of the Canary Islands, and habitat destruction for agriculture. It would not be the only lizard from the Canary Islands to have been considered extinct only to be rediscovered later: the same happened to El Hierro giant lizard and La Gomera giant lizard (rediscovered 1974 and 1999, respectively). The somewhat smaller Tenerife speckled lizard was only discovered for the first time in 1996.

Not a single living individual has been captured, so it is considered Critically Endangered, possibly extinct.

== See also ==
- List of Macaronesian animals extinct in the Holocene
