= L. maxima =

L. maxima may refer to:

- Lacerta maxima, an extinct lizard
- Lysimachia maxima, a plant endemic to Hawaii
