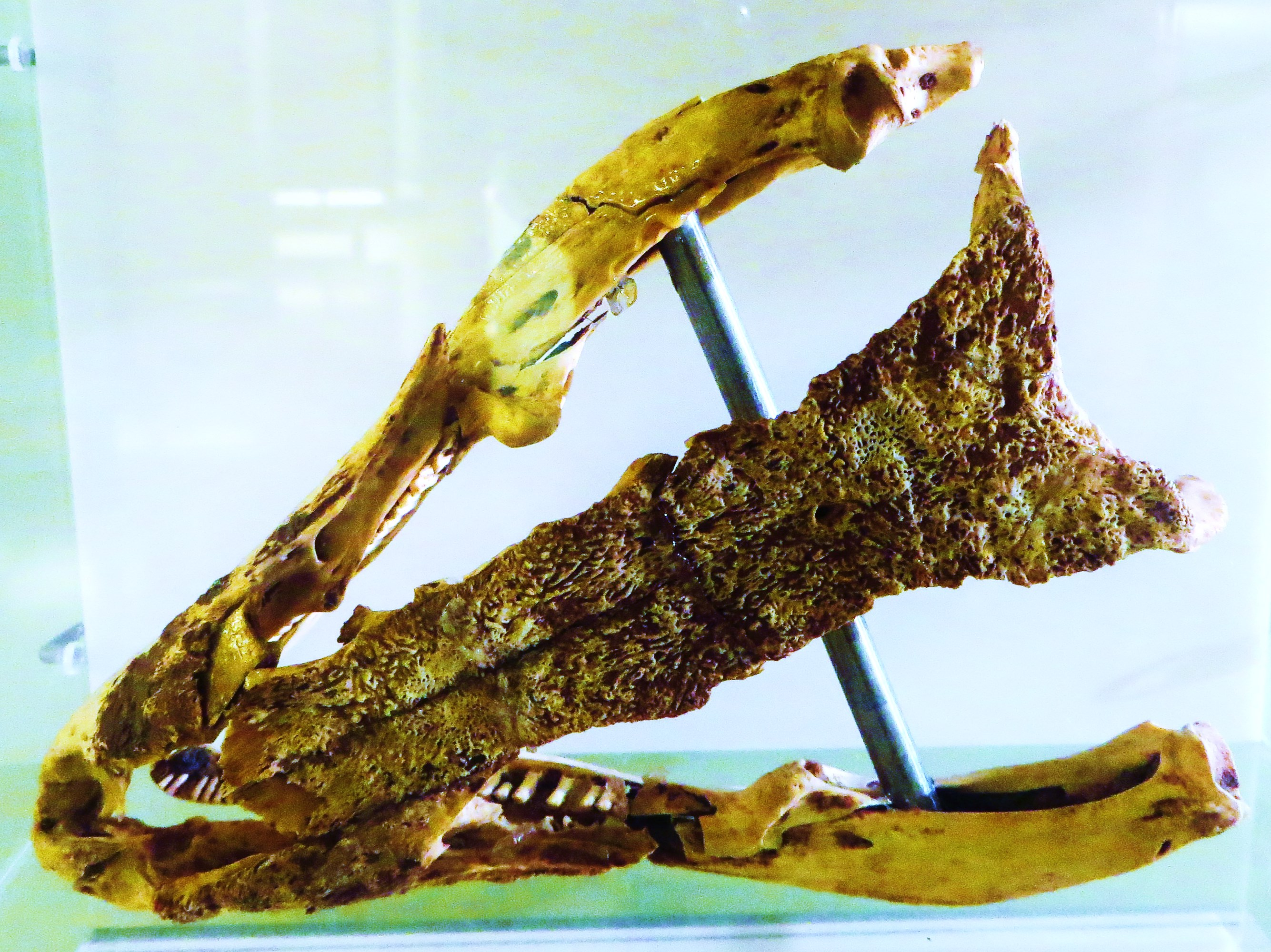
- Skull in Museo de la Naturaleza y el Hombre of Santa Cruz de Tenerife.

Scientific classification
- Kingdom: Animalia
- Phylum: Chordata
- Class: Reptilia
- Order: Squamata
- Suborder: Lacertoidea
- Family: Lacertidae
- Genus: Gallotia
- Species: †G. goliath

Binomial name
- †Gallotia goliath Mertens, 1942

Synonyms
- Gallotia maxima Bravo, 1953; Lacerta maxima Bravo, 1953; Lacerta goliath Mertens, 1942

= Gallotia goliath =

Gallotia goliath Temporal range: Late Pleistocene-Holocene

Extinct species of lizard

Gallotia goliath (the Tenerife giant lizard or goliath Tenerife lizard) is an extinct giant lizard species from the island of Tenerife of the Canary Islands, Spain. This reptile lived before the arrival of humans and is believed to have grown to at least 0.9 metres (3.0 ft) long. It was described by the German herpetologist Robert Mertens. Fossils of this lizard have been found in volcanic caves, where they often appear with those of other animals, like the Tenerife giant rat.

In 2024, the discovery of a 700,000-year-old fossil specimen of two giant lizards was announced. They are believed to have been found together in a dune formation, and their deaths occurred accidentally, as their bone structure is almost intact.

== Classification ==
Prehistoric Gallotia remains have been assigned to the taxa G. maxima and G. goliath, the former supposedly occurring only on Tenerife, the latter on several islands. It was eventually determined, however, that G. maxima is a junior synonym of G. goliath, and that the latter was close to the El Hierro giant lizard (Gallotia simonyi); supposed goliath specimens from El Hierro, La Gomera, and La Palma (from the Cuevas de los Murciélagos) are probably just extremely large individuals of, respectively, the El Hierro, La Gomera (Gallotia bravoana) and La Palma (Gallotia auaritae) giant lizards. Based on DNA sequence analysis of mummified remains, G. goliath is a valid species that probably was restricted to Tenerife, and apparently was closer to the Tenerife speckled lizard (Gallotia intermedia) than to the El Hierro giant lizard.

== Characteristics ==
G. goliath was the largest reptile in the Canary Islands, reaching a length of 120 to 125 cm (3.94 to 4.10 ft) but based on the finding of a 13.5 cm (5.3 in) skull in 1952, there could have been even larger specimens. These giant lizards inhabited the coastal lowlands of the island.

== Palaeobiology ==
=== Palaeoecology ===
Paired analysis of the δ^{13}C and δ^{15}N analysis of G. goliath indicates that it was omnivorous and that it mostly consumed carbon that was ultimately derived from C_{3} plants. Although the two had similar diets, the δ^{13}C and δ^{15}N values of G. goliath also differed slightly from the Tenerife giant rat with which it coexisted, an isotopic sign of niche partitioning.

== Extinction ==
It inhabited Tenerife from the late Pleistocene through the Holocene until the fifteenth century of our era. Bone remains of this species have been found in different archaeological sites with marks that show that they were consumed by the aborigines of the island (Guanches). There is written documentation about its existence in the fifteenth century, so its extinction must have occurred in the years after the conquest of the Canaries by the Castilians.

== Gallery ==
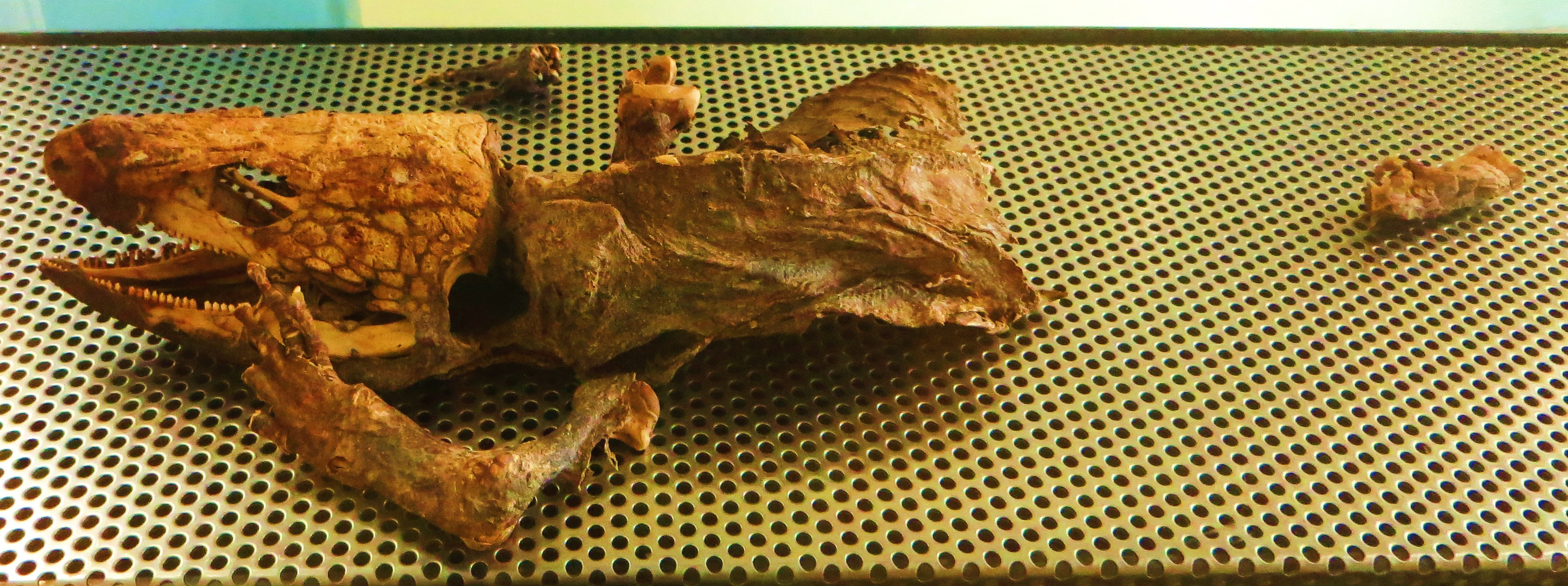
Mummified specimen in Museo de la Naturaleza y el Hombre.

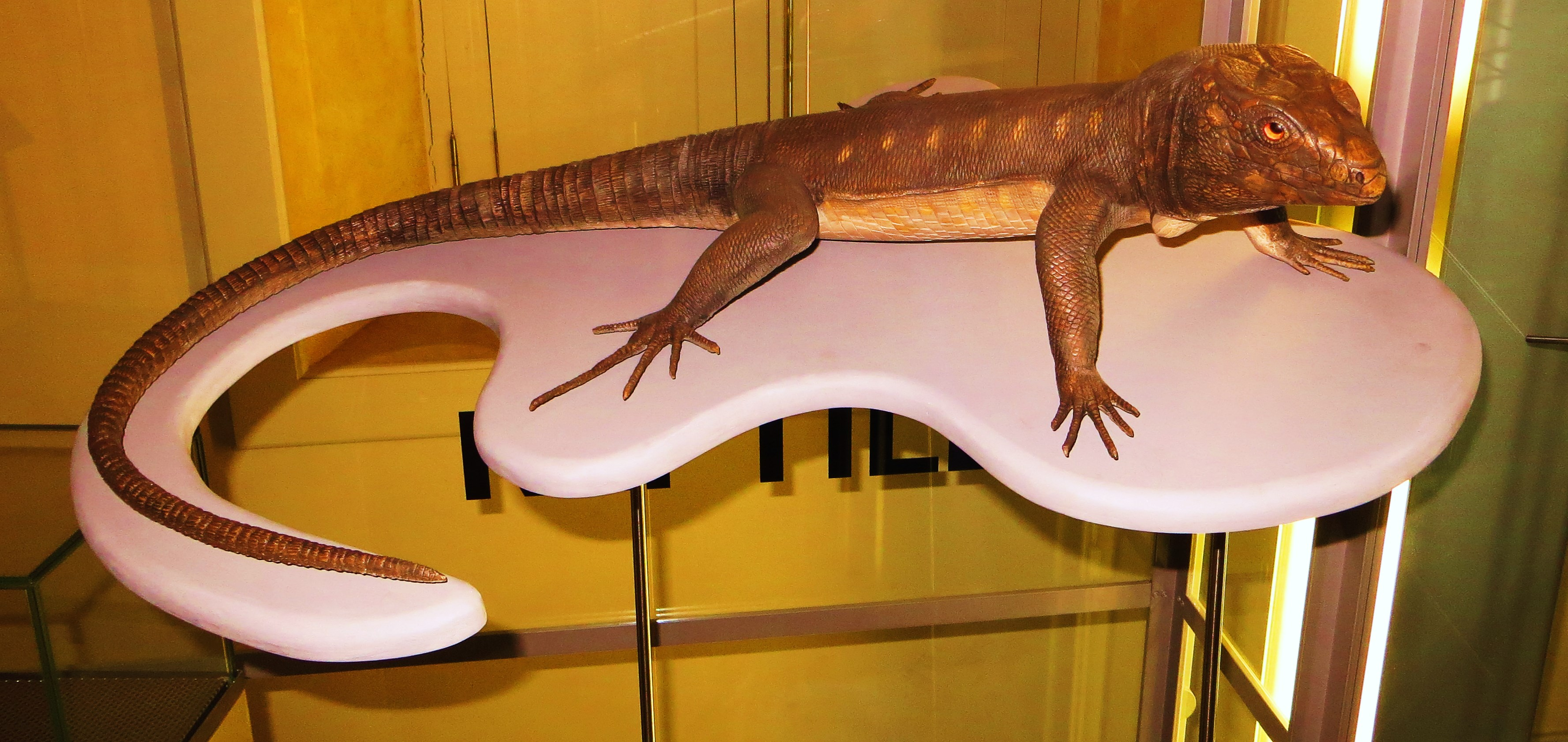
Model in Museo de la Naturaleza y el Hombre.

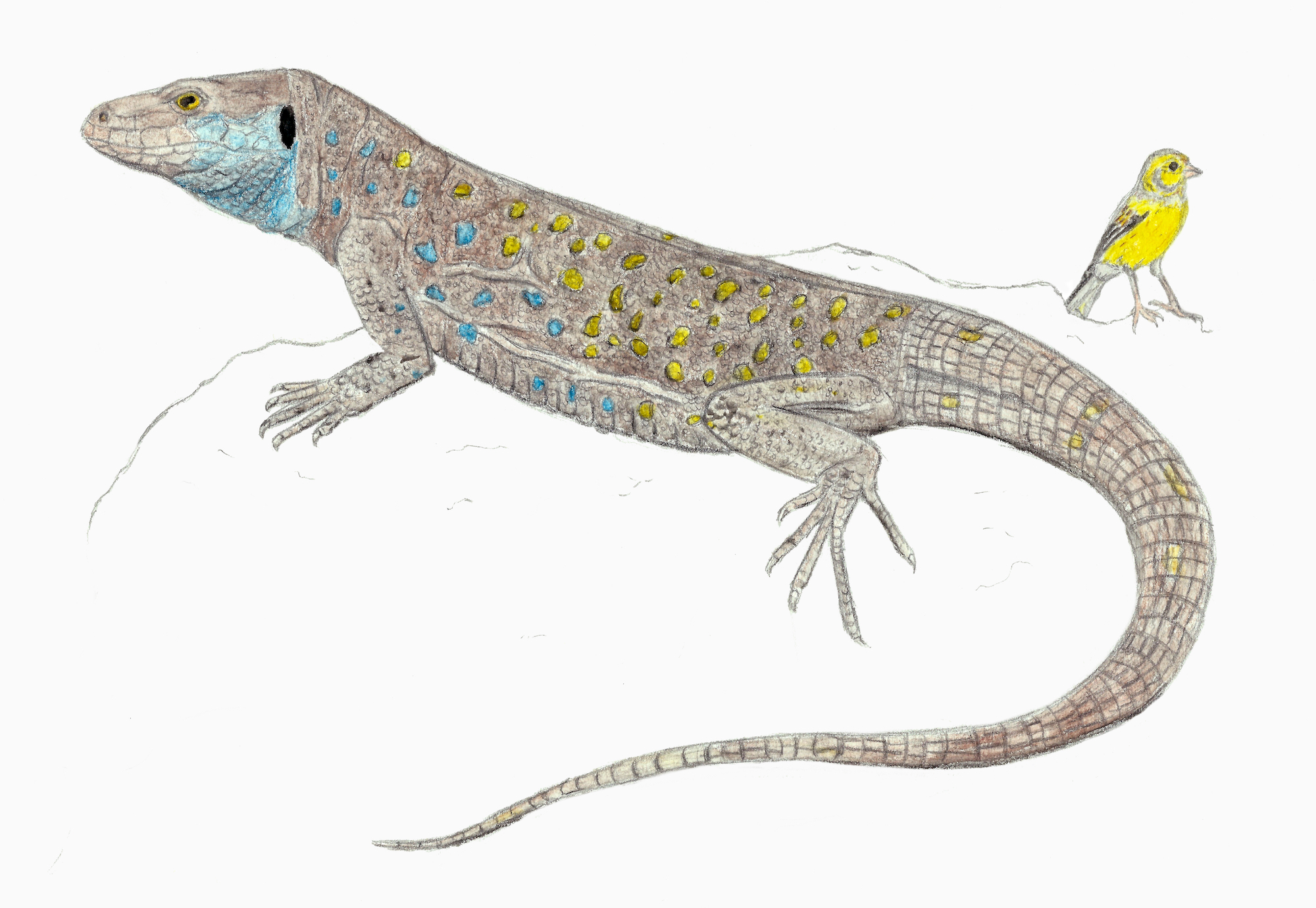
Life restoration, based on known remains and extant Gallotia lizards. A canary (Serinus canaria) is shown for size reference

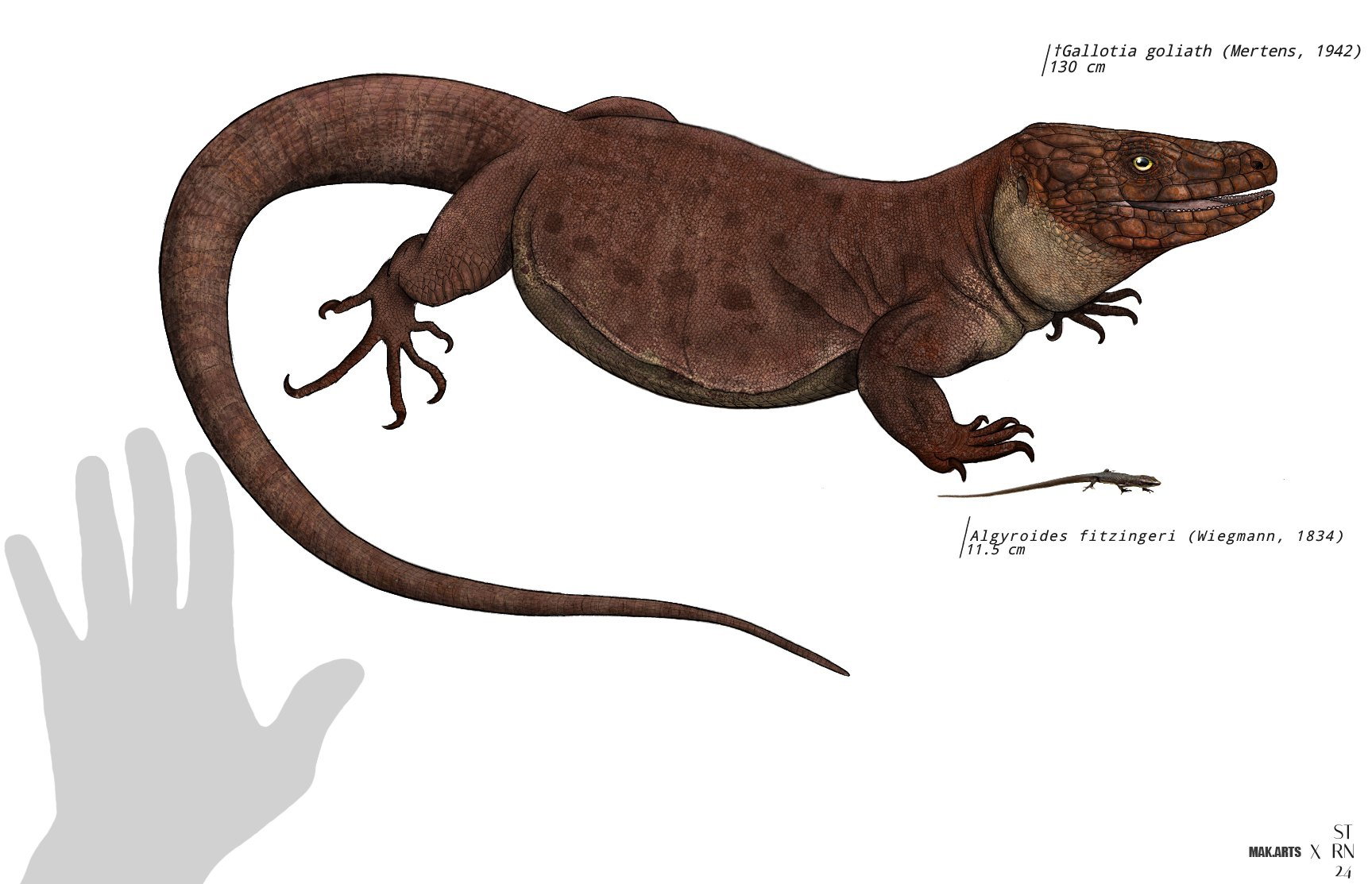
Reconstruction of Gallotia goliath with an average human hand and Algyroides fitzingeri to scale.

== See also ==
- Island gigantism
- List of largest extinct lizards
