= Philipp Lehrs =

German herpetologist (1881–1956)

- Born: 1881
- Died: 1956 (aged 74–75)
- Known for: Studies on the lizard family Lacertidae
- Scientific career
- Fields: Herpetology
- Institutions: Zoologischen Forschungsinstitut; Forschungsmuseum Alexander Koenig

Philipp Lehrs (1881–1956) was a German herpetologist who specialized in the lizard family Lacertidae. During his career, he was associated with the Zoologischen Forschungsinstitut (Zoological Research Institute) and Forschungsmuseum Alexander Koenig (Alexander Koenig Research Museum) in Bonn.

== Taxa ==
Lehrs is the binomial author of the following species/subspecies of lizards:

- Gallotia caesaris (Boettger's lizard), (1914). Named in honor of German malacologist Caesar Rudolf Boettger.
- Parvilacerta fraasi (Fraas's lizard), (1910).
- Lacerta ionica (1902), synonymous with Podarcis tauricus (Crimean wall lizard). The name Podarcis tauricus ionicus is regarded as a subspecies.

== Publications ==
- Zur Kenntnis der Gattung Lacerta und einer verkannten Form: Lacerta ionica. Zool. Anz. 25: 225-237, 1902 – On the genus Lacerta and an unrecognized species, Lacerta ionica.
- Studien über Abstammung und Ausbreitung in den Formenkreisen der Gattung "Lacerta" und ihrer Verwandten, 1909 – Studies on the lineage and propagation in "Formenkreisen" of the genus Lacerta and its relatives (inaugural dissertation).
- Ueber eine Lacerta ans dem hohen Libanon (L. Frasii n. sp.) und mehrexe Montanformen unter den Eildechsen, 1910 – On Lacerta found in the highlands of Lebanon.
- Goethes naturwissenschaftliche Sammlungen, 1914 – On Goethe's scientific collections.
- Goethes Sammlungen zur Zoologie und vergleichenden Anatomie, 1920 – Goethe's collections of zoology and comparative anatomy.
