= Roque Chico de Salmor giant lizard =

Roque Chico de Salmor giant lizard Temporal range: 0.01–0.0001 Ma Late Pleistocene–Recent

Conservation status
- Extinct (1931)

Scientific classification
- Kingdom: Animalia
- Phylum: Chordata
- Class: Reptilia
- Order: Squamata
- Family: Lacertidae
- Genus: Gallotia
- Species: G. simonyi
- Subspecies: †G. s. simonyi

Trinomial name
- †Gallotia simonyi simonyi (Steindachner, 1889)

Extinct subspecies of lizard

The Roque Chico de Salmor giant lizard (Gallotia simonyi simonyi) is the extinct nominate subspecies of Simony's giant lizard (Gallotia simonyi). It was endemic to the small islet Roque Chico de Salmor (lit. "Salmor Small Rock") northwest of El Hierro, the westernmost of the Canary Islands.

== Description ==
Preserved male specimens measure between 223 and 236 mm long, excluding the tail, and females between 174 and 197 mm. Compared to the extant subspecies from the mainland (G. s. machadoi), the subspecies from Roque Chico de Salmor was larger and more robust, with the top of the head more triangular and less oval, more depressed head, and on average, more dorsal scales, fewer temporal scales, more femoral pores, and more scales on the sixth ring of the tail. Mitochondrial DNA studies suggest that the two subspecies separated recently, as a result of rising sea levels at the end of the Pleistocene.

== Distribution and habitat ==
Roque Chico de Salmor is a small islet situated 830 meters to the northwest of El Hierro and 340 meters from the larger Roque Grande de Salmor. Its extension is less than one hectare and is surrounded by tall cliffs. Vegetation is sparse but it is home to breeding colonies of seabirds. Plants present include Astydamia latifoliae, Mesembrianthemum, Chenopodium, Chenoloides tomentosa, Beta, Silene and Rubia fruticosa.

== Discovery ==
Despite being hunted by the Guanches, who also started clearing the island's forests and introduced exotic predators like dogs and possibly cats, giant lizards were still common in areas of El Hierro when Europeans arrived at the beginning of the 15th century. They severely declined with colonization, however, and by the 18th century were forgotten by the inhabitants of the island.

In 1799, José de Viera y Clavijo wrote in his Diccionario de Historia Natural de las Islas Canarias that rumors existed of a small islet near El Hierro that was inhabited by lizards so large that they could bend iron bars with their tails; he presumed these animals to be caimans. Following the publication of Viera y Clavijo's book in 1866, Franz Steindachner of the Naturhistorisches Museum of Vienna requested his colleague Oskar Simony to investigate the matter during a scheduled trip to the Canary Islands. On 28 August 1889, Simony arrived in El Hierro and collected four lizards in Roque Chico de Salmor with the help of grocer Eloy Díaz Casañas. Steindachner used three of these lizards to describe a new species, Lacerta simonyi.

== Extinction ==
News of the discovery instantly caught the attention of naturalists, adventurers, and collectionists, who traveled to Roque Chico de Salmor to catch their own specimens. The most damaging was wildlife trader Thomas Castle (born Tomás Ximénez del Castillo in Puerto de la Cruz) who, after convincing Díaz Casañas to gift him the fourth lizard collected with Simony and selling it for a high price, returned to capture 21 lizards in 1896 and 27 more in 1908, selling them in London and Hamburg. This trade spurred Díaz Casañas, his son, nephew, and local fishermen to capture more lizards for sale or exhibition. In 1931, English teacher Hugh B. Scott and local journalist José Padrón Machín collected two lizards in Roque Chico de Salmor, but they were already so rare that they spent the first three days without seeing one. No more lizards were seen after this date, and a local legend arose that a British or German trader had captured twenty lizards and poisoned the rest to keep the exclusivity of their sale. Ten specimens are preserved in the Naturhistorisches Museum of Vienna, British Museum of Natural History, Santa Cruz de la Palma, and Santa Cruz de Tenerife.

The species Gallotia simonyi, then considered a monotypic taxon, was believed extinct until the subspecies G. s. machadoi was discovered in the Crag of Tibataje in 1975. In 1999, 36 members of this subspecies were introduced successfully to Roque Chico de Salmor, exhibiting low mortality and signs of reproduction.

== See also ==
- List of Macaronesian animals extinct in the Holocene
- Cape Verde giant skink

== Further bibliography ==
- Blanco, Juan Carlos & González, José Luis (eds.) (1992): Libro rojo de los vertebrados de España. ICONA, Madrid.
- Böhme, W. & Bings, Werner (1975): Zur Frage des Überlebens von Lacerta s. simonyi Steindachner. Salamandra 11(1): 39–46. [Article in German]
- Diaz, Carlos Naeslund & Bischoff, Wolfgang (1994): Studien am Roque Chico de Salmor bei El Hierro (Kanaren): 1. Mögliche Ursachen für das Aussterben von Gallotia simonyi, 2. Die Artzugehörigkeit seiner Geckos (Tarentola). Salamandra 30(4): 246–253. [Article in German] HTML abstract
- European Environment Agency (2006): European Nature Information System (EUNIS): Species Factsheet: Gallotia simonyi simonyi. Downloaded on 24 Feb 2007.
- Maas, Peter H.J. (2006): The Extinction Website: Extinctions in Europe. Downloaded on 18 May 2006.
- Jose Antonio Mateo Miras, Valentin Pérez-Mellado, Iñigo Martínez-Solano (2009). "Gallotia simonyi". IUCN Red List of Threatened Species. 2009 e.T8881A12935900. doi:10.2305/IUCN.UK.2009.RLTS.T8881A12935900.en. Database entry includes a range map and justification for why this species is critically endangered
