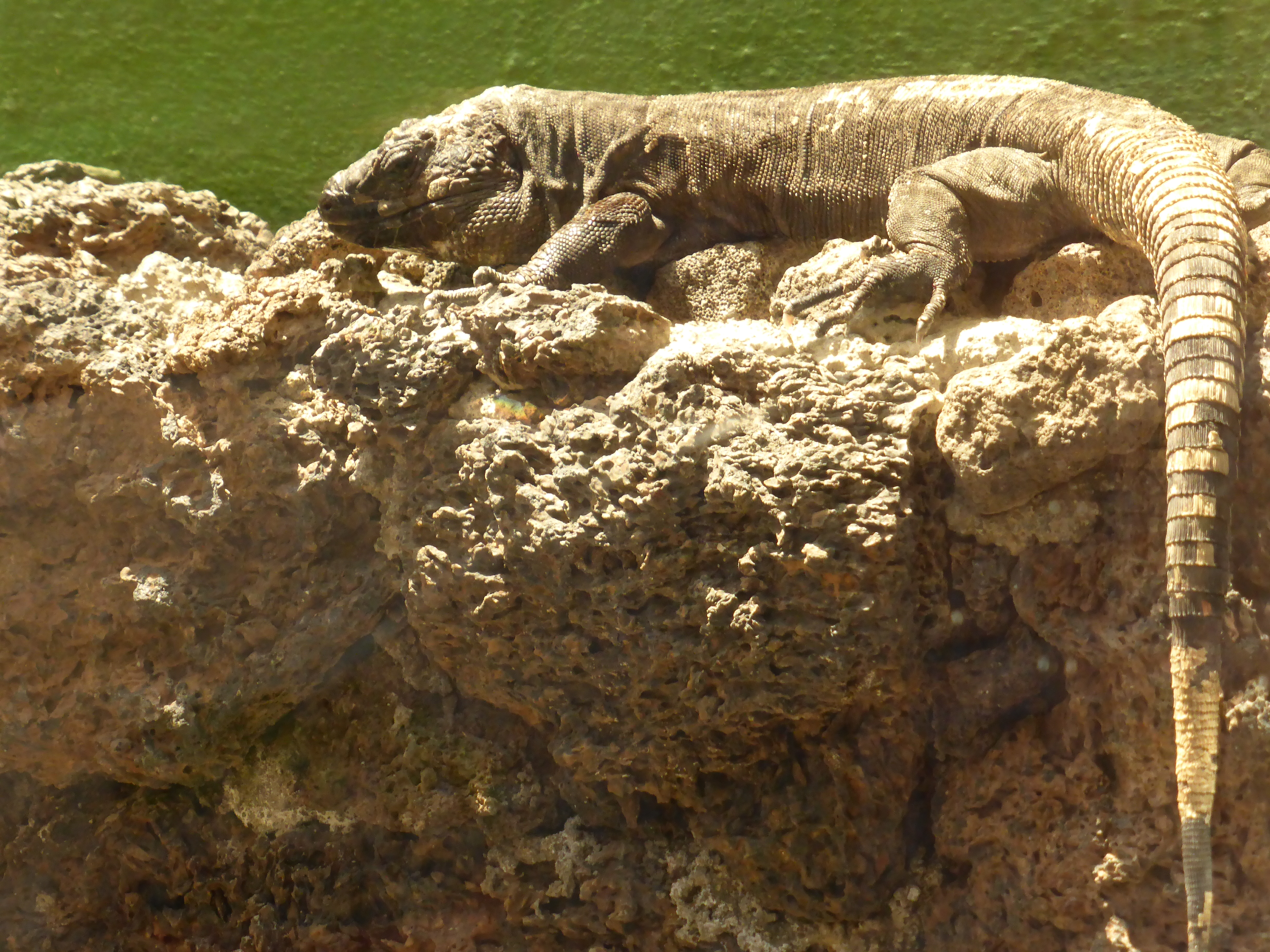

Conservation status
- Critically Endangered (IUCN 3.1)

- Endangered (ESA)

Scientific classification
- Kingdom: Animalia
- Phylum: Chordata
- Class: Reptilia
- Order: Squamata
- Suborder: Lacertoidea
- Family: Lacertidae
- Genus: Gallotia
- Species: G. simonyi
- Subspecies: G. s. machadoi

Trinomial name
- Gallotia simonyi machadoi Lopez-Jurado, 1989
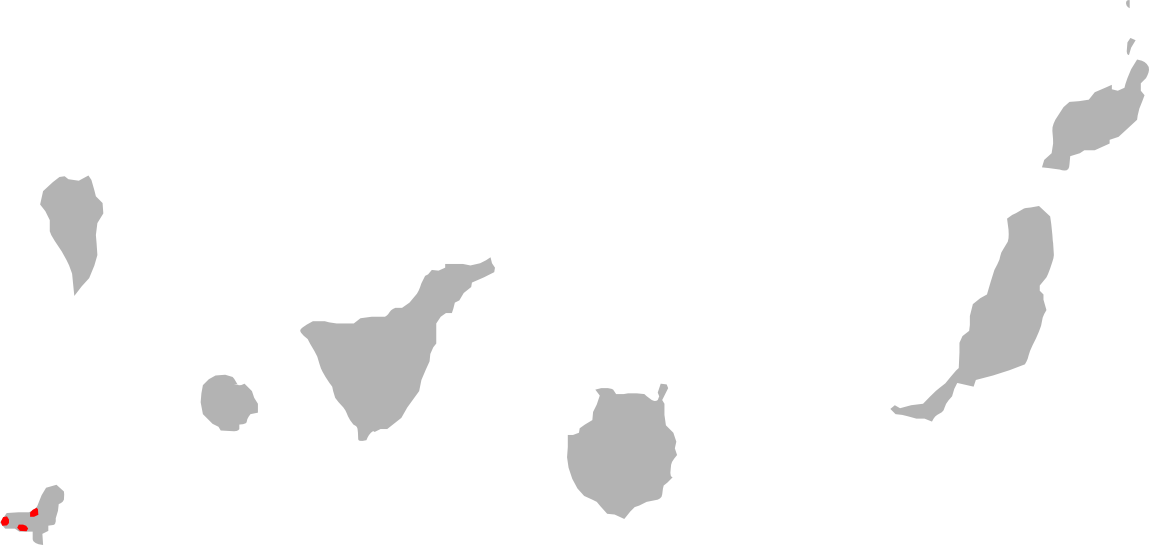
- Range in the Canary Islands

= El Hierro giant lizard =

El Hierro giant lizard Temporal range: 0.01–0 Ma Late Pleistocene–Recent

Subspecies of lizard

The El Hierro giant lizard (Gallotia simonyi machadoi) is the only extant, critically endangered subspecies of Simony's giant lizard. It is endemic to El Hierro, the westernmost of the Canary Islands, where it is an official symbol.

== Description ==
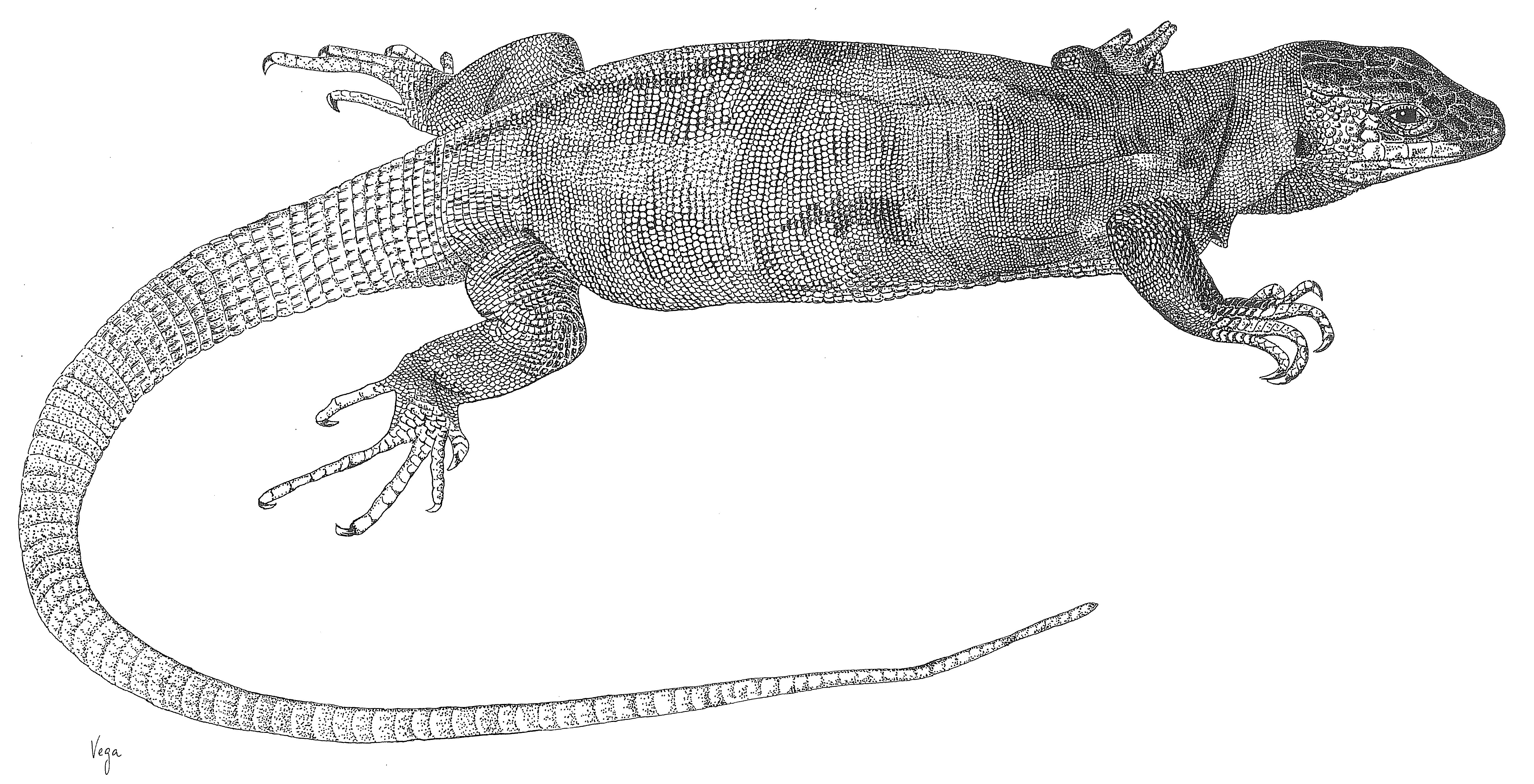
Female.

In 1999, wild adult males from Tibataje were measured between 120 and 200 mm in length, excluding the tail, and females between 110 and 160 mm. An earlier study in 1985 using fewer animals measured females up to 174 mm. The size is smaller than the observed in the extinct nominate subspecies from Roque Chico de Salmor, G. s. simonyi (223–236 mm in males and 174–197 in females). However, individuals raised in captivity from Tibataje stock reach larger sizes, 144–226 mm for the males and 143–204 mm for the females. Tail is roughly 1'4-1'7 times as long as the rest of the body in both sexes. Subfossil remains evidence that El Hierro giant lizards were much larger before the Guanches colonized the island at the end of the first millennium BC, with some individuals estimated to have surpassed one meter in total length.

Besides being smaller and less robust, the subspecies differs from the nominate in having the top of the head less triangular and more oval, less depressed head, and on average, fewer dorsal scales, more temporal scales, fewer femoral pores, and fewer scales on the sixth ring of the tail.

== Distribution and habitat ==
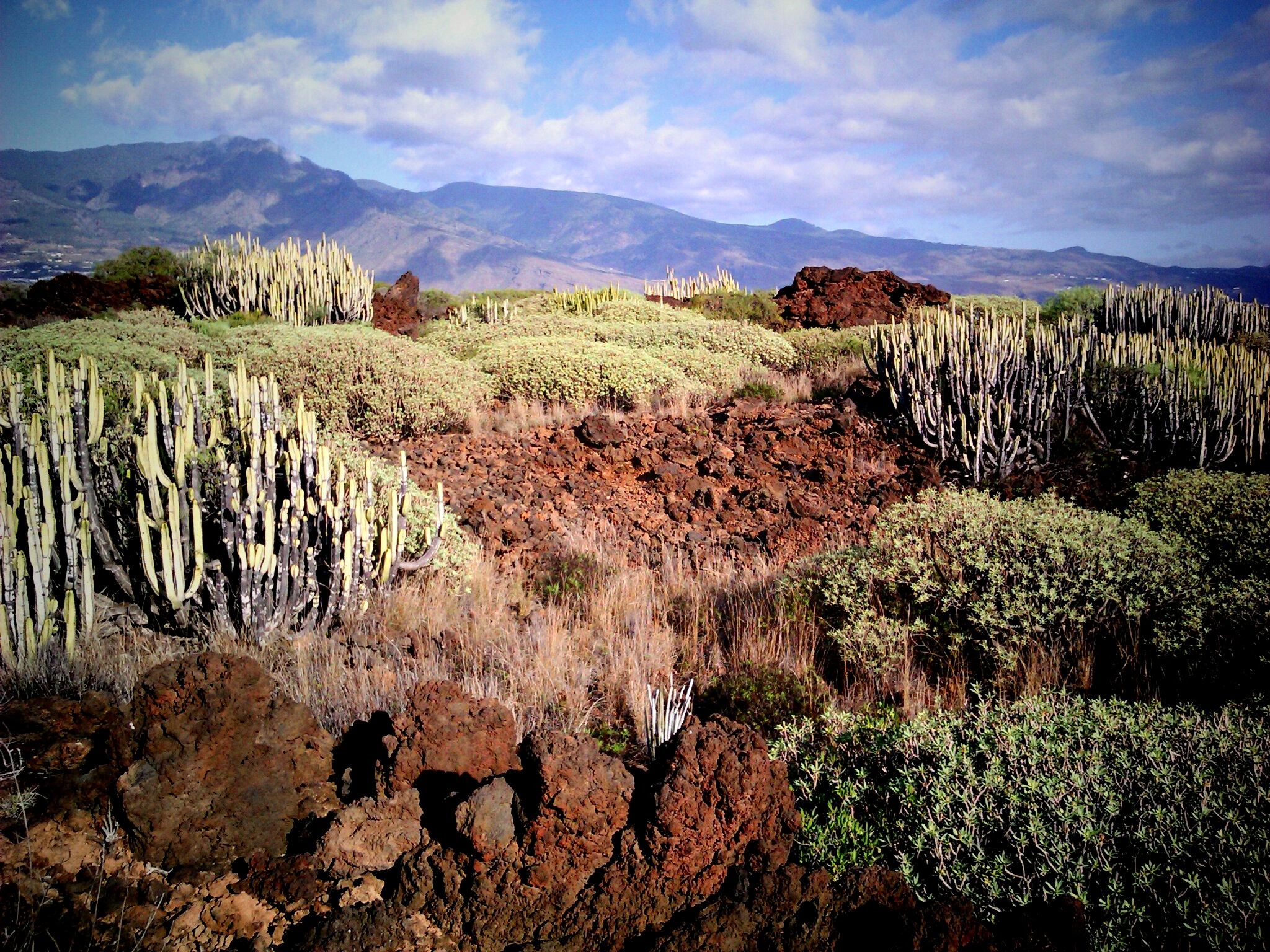
"Cardonal-tabaibal" vegetation of the Canary Islands, dominated by species of the genus Euphorbia.

Subfossil remains reveal that the El Hierro giant lizard was once widespread through the island, up to 700 meters above sea level. The potential vegetation of these areas includes Euphorbia, thermophile forest, and Canarian pine, though the lizards generally stayed away from forested areas.

The subspecies later became restricted to the southern end of the Tibataje crag in Fuga de Gorreta, between Guinea and Paso del Pino, occupying an area of about four hectares. This is a steep cliff area, 1100 meters tall, that offers protection from invasive mammals. This population is stabilized at 250 animals. The area is occupied by xeric scrubland dominated by Euphorbia brousssonetii on the higher parts, Senecio kleinia and Periploca laevigata below. Other vegetation includes Kleinia neriifolia, Echium hierrense, Lavandula canariensis, Artemisia thuscula, Psoralea bituminosa, Micromeria hyssopifolia and Cistus monspeliensis.

A second population was established in 1999 by releasing 36 captive-bred animals on Roque Chico de Salmor, a small islet northwest of El Hierro that was inhabited by the nominate subspecies G. s. simonyi until 1931. The islet is home to breeding seabirds but has sparse vegetation consisting of Astydamia latifoliae, Mesembrianthemum, Chenopodium, Chenoloides tomentosa, Beta, Silene and Rubia fruticosa. The population later multiplied to 120 animals.

== Ecology and behavior ==
=== Diet ===
El Hierro giant lizards are omnivorous. They consume mainly plants but also coleopterans, ants, and small vertebrates including house mouse, Boettger's lizard, Boettger's wall gecko, and birds. They distinguish and recognize the smell of plants and animals they eat. Consumed plants include Liliaceae, Psoralea bituminosa, Graminaceae, Lavandula canariensis, Euphorbia broussonetti, Rubia fruticosa, Schyzogone sericea, Echium hierrense, Euphorbia obtusolia, fruit of Rumex lunaria, other flowers and seeds. In Roque Chico de Salmor, lizards have been observed eating dead orthopterans that were regurgitated by chicks of yellow-legged gulls.

=== Reproduction ===
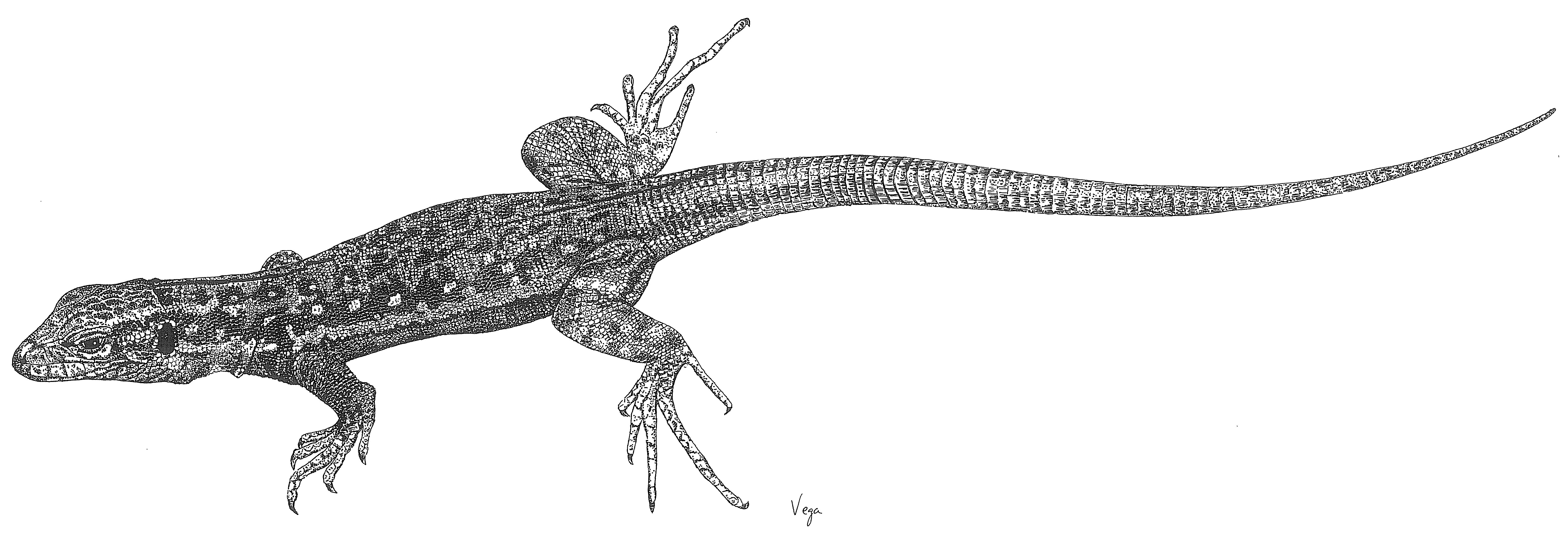
Juvenile.

In the first two weeks of May, the ocelli on the sides of the male turn bright yellow and both sexes become more aggressive. Before mating, the male inflates its throat and moves its head up and down, advances in a curve and bites the female on the nape. The female responds to the male's advances with quick head movements and shaking the proximal end of the tail up and down. Females can retain viable sperm in their bodies for a year. A clutch of eggs is laid between 6 June and 3 August; sometimes a second clutch is laid between 16 and 23 August. The number of eggs varies between five and thirteen; the older the female, the more eggs are laid. Eggs incubate at 28-29 °C for 61 days. Newborns weight 3-6 grams and measure 44–58 mm, plus a tail of 87–133 mm. Females mature after a minimum of four years and are always more numerous than the males.

=== Predation ===
Common kestrels, buzzards, and ravens are believed to be the natural predators of the El Hierro giant lizard, at least as a juvenile. Predation of adults and juveniles by introduced feral cats and brown rats is well attested, being the main threat to the species's survival. Before protection, adult lizards were also killed by herding dogs when they ventured into the lower areas of Tibataje. In the event of predation, the El Hierro giant lizard's main defence is to run away, though it is slower than other Gallotia species. Juveniles suffer more predation than adults. Sometimes adults choose to face a potential predator opening their mouth and making noise, but this behavior is less common than in the Gran Canaria giant lizard, G. stehlini.

Known parasites include nematodes (Thelandros filiformis, T. galloti, Parapharyngodon micipsae), protozoans (Sarcocystis simonyi), bacteria (Staphylococcus saprophyticus, S. viridans, Citrobacter braaki, C. diversus, Salmonella enterica), and fungi (Aspergillus terreus, Rhodoturula glutinis).

=== Other relations and adaptations ===
El Hierro giant lizards frequent an area of 200 to 300 m^{2} but are not territorial. Adults tolerate the presence of other animals and even climb on top of one another. Juveniles display hostility to animals of the same age, but ignore Boettger's lizards of the same size.

The species is diurnal, remaining active for most of the day and the whole year, in the wet and dry season alike, with just a slight descent of activity or increased hiding in the summer. The preferred temperature is 35.6 °C for adults and 36.3 °C for juveniles. However they tolerate and remain active at lower temperatures than other Gallotia species.

== History ==
=== Decline ===
Mitochondrial DNA studies indicate that the two subspecies separated recently, as a result of rising sea levels at the end of the Pleistocene. The first human inhabitants of the island ate lizards, introduced dogs and possibly cats that also predated on them. As a result, the lizards decreased in size and disappeared from some regions. Nevertheless, they were still common enough upon European arrival for both Jean de Bethencourt and Gadifer de La Salle to mention them in their writings, in which they describe lizards as big as cats. The clearing of the thermophile forest, definitive introduction of predating cats and also rats, and competing goats and rabbits, put the El Hierro giant lizards into decline from the 15th century. By the 17th century they could only be found in three or four places in the island, after which they disappear from writing accounts. The species was forgotten by the end of the 18th century, when José de Viera y Clavijo speculated that rumors about giant lizards existing in an islet off the coast of the island might refer to caimans. However, others like 19th century notary Antonio María Manrique y Saavedra thought they were large lizards like those found in other Canary Islands.

The species G. simonyi was discovered for science in 1889, when Oskar Simony found the lizards of Roque Chico de Salmor while investigating Viera y Clavijo's account at the request of Franz Steindachner of the Naturhistorisches Museum in Vienna. The islet instantly became a magnet for European naturalists, adventurers, collectors, and wildlife traffickers eager to take more specimens, until the population was extirpated in 1931. As no other population was known, the species was presumed extinct.

=== Rediscovery ===
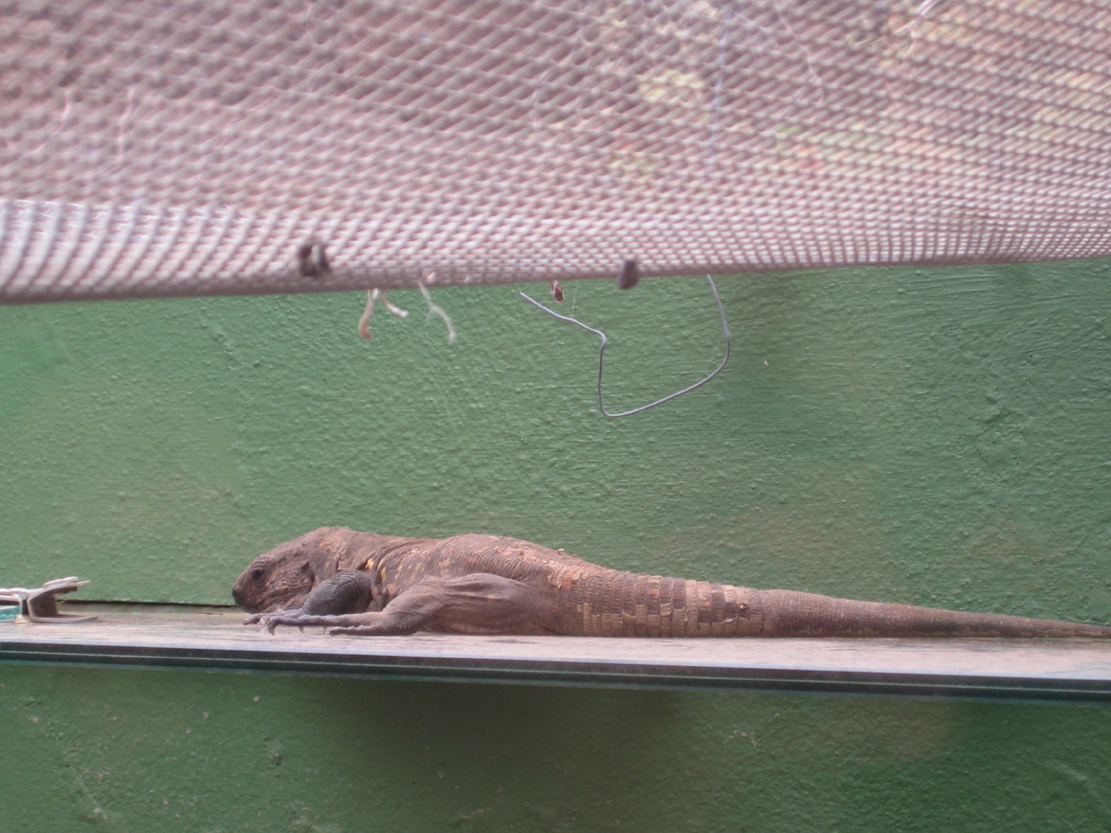
El Hierro giant lizard in captivity.

In 1971, the Spanish biologist Alfredo Salvador raised the possibility that the El Hierro giant lizard still existed in Fuga de Gorreta, having collected testimonies of goat herders and finding the excrements of a large lizard himself. However, by 1974 Salvador considered them extinct due to all sightings being older than twenty years. After reading Salvador and earlier literature, a German architect and amateur lizard breeder, Werner Bings, decided to search for the El Hierro giant lizard himself and take a breeding couple to Germany in the event of success, once he checked with the Spanish embassy in Bonn that the species was not listed as protected in Spain.

Bings interviewed herders and used bait. He found that areas reputedly inhabited by the giant lizard were not occupied by the smaller Boettger's lizard, and also recovered recent excrement from a large lizard. Finally, 72-year old herder Juan Machín gave Bings a partial skeleton with remains of skin still attached. This skeleton was identified in Germany as a juvenile G. simonyi, killed about two years before, although with differences compared to the Roque Chico de Salmor lizards that might warrant different species or subspecies status. Only a few days after Bings left for Germany, on 13 July 1975, Machín caught two lizards in a trap. They were kept alive by a German resident in the island for a couple of days, but when he tried to take them to Germany the Government Delegate ordered the Civil Guard to requisition the lizards and release them in the same place they were found. The German consul protested the move, arguing that an "extinct" species could not be subject of protection.

The population was immediately studied and photographed by biologists of the Mancomunidad de Cabildos, Museo Nacional de Ciencias Naturales, and ICONA. In 1989, it was described as a distinct subspecies, G. s. machadoi by Luis F. López-Jurado, one hundred years after the nominate.

== Conservation efforts ==
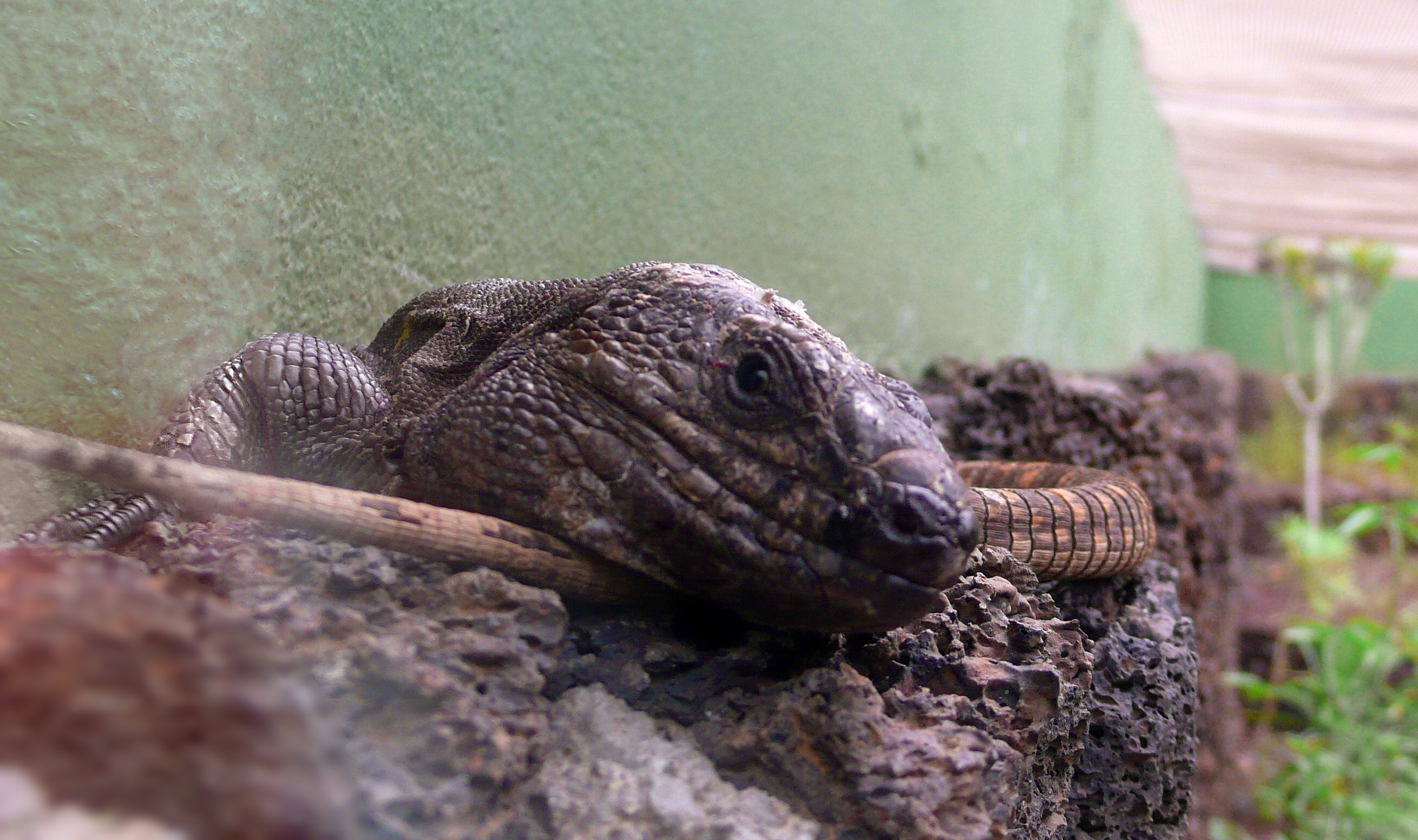
El Hierro giant lizard at the Guinea conservation center.

The El Hierro giant lizard was declared a protected species in 1975. A breeding program began in Guinea, El Hierro in 1986 (since 1995 a LIFE programme of the European Union) producing hundreds of animals in captivity. In 1987 the giant lizards' habitat in Tibataje was declared a natural reserve. In 1999, thirty-seven captive bred subadults were released in Roque Chico de Salmor, and two hundred were released in El Julan, El Hierro. Another release was made in 2001 in La Dehesa, also in El Hierro. The population in Roque Chico grew and became established rapidly, but the populations in the latter two require constant monitoring of feral cats to reduce predation. In 2013, thirty-five were released in Punta de Arelmo and thirty-two in Punta de Agache. It is planned to establish seven population centers, including a second insular one in Roque Grande de Salmor.

The IUCN Red List classifies the El Hierro giant lizard in the category of critically endangered CR B1ab(v)+2ab(v), due to occupying less than 10 km^{2}, being present in less than 100 km^{2}, and having a fragmented distribution, although the population is not in decline and has only increased since 2002. This could be reversed, however, if control of feral cats stops. In 2007, a storm destroyed most of the captive breeding center, killing 182 of 268 lizards inside. A new center was built afterward.

The El Hierro giant lizard is listed on Annex IV of the European Union's Habitats Directive (EC 2003) and on Appendix I of CITES.

== Further sources ==
- ARKive (2006): Hierro giant lizard (Gallotia simonyi). Downloaded on 18 May 2006.
- Barahona, F.; Evans, S. E.; Mateo, J.A.; García-Márquez, M. & López-Jurado, L.F. (2000): Endemism, gigantism and extinction in island lizards: the genus Gallotia on the Canary Islands. J. Zool. 250(3): 373–388. doi:10.1017/S0952836900003101 (HTML abstract)
- Bischoff, Wolfgang (2000): DGHT-AG Lacertiden aktuell: Rieseneidechsen auf La Gomera. Version of 2000-MAY-23. Retrieved 2007-FEB-25.
- Diaz, Carlos Naeslund & Bischoff, Wolfgang (1994): Studien am Roque Chico de Salmor bei El Hierro (Kanaren): 1. Mögliche Ursachen für das Aussterben von Gallotia simonyi, 2. Die Artzugehörigkeit seiner Geckos (Tarentola). Salamandra 30(4): 246–253. [Article in German] HTML abstract
- European Commission (EC) (2003): Council Directive 92/43/EEC on the Conservation of natural habitats and of wild fauna and flora. Annex IV - Animal and plant species of community interest in need of strict protection. Treaty of Accession 2003. PDF fulltext
- European Environment Agency (2006a): European Nature Information System (EUNIS): Species Factsheet: Gallotia simonyi. Downloaded on 24 Feb 2007.
- European Environment Agency (2006b): European Nature Information System (EUNIS): Species Factsheet: Gallotia simonyi machadoi. Downloaded on 24 Feb 2007.
- Maas, Peter H.J. (2006): The Extinction Website: Extinctions in Europe. Downloaded on 18 May 2006.
- Maca-Meyer, N.; Carranza, S.; Rando, J.C.; Arnold, E.N. & Cabrera, V.M. (2003): Status and relationships of the extinct giant Canary Island lizard Gallotia goliath (Reptilia: Lacertidae), assessed using ancient mtDNA from its mummified remains. Biol. J. Linn. Soc. 80(4): 659–670. doi:10.1111/j.1095-8312.2003.00265.x (HTML abstract)
