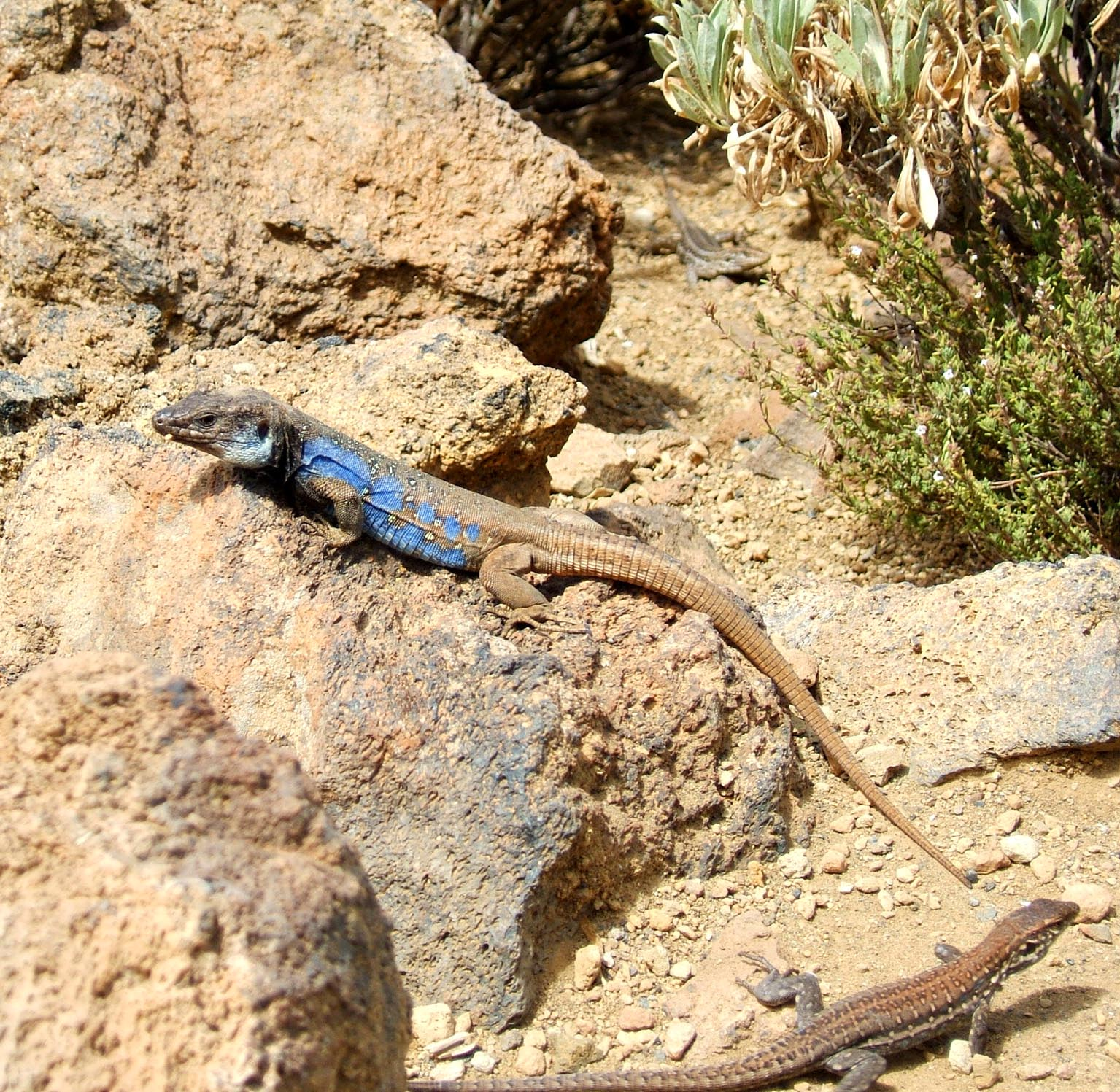
- Tenerife lizard (Gallotia galloti galloti) male (top) and female

Scientific classification
- Kingdom: Animalia
- Phylum: Chordata
- Class: Reptilia
- Order: Squamata
- Family: Lacertidae
- Subfamily: Gallotiinae
- Genus: Gallotia; Boulenger, 1916

Species
- Gallotia atlantica; Gallotia auaritae; Gallotia bravoana; Gallotia caesaris; Gallotia galloti; †Gallotia goliath (subfossil); Gallotia intermedia; Gallotia simonyi; †Gallotia simonyi simonyi; Gallotia simonyi machadoi; Gallotia stehlini

= Gallotia =

Gallotia Temporal range: 10–0 Ma Miocene–Recent

Genus of lizards

The genus Gallotia are the lacertids (wall lizards) of the Canary Islands. This genus consists of a group that has been evolving there ever since the first islands emerged from the sea over 20 million years ago. The endemic species and subspecies of this group have a number of characteristics that make them quite special within their family (Lacertidae); their only close relatives are the sandrunner lizards (Psammodromus) of the western Mediterranean region. Gallotia are characteristic for eating significant quantities of plants, and several lineages are often presented as classic examples for insular gigantism. However, a find of an even larger Gallotia species from the early Miocene of mainland Europe casts doubt on this assumption. Instead the ancestor of all modern Gallotia species of the Canary islands was probably already very large but carnivorous (Černaňský et al., 2016).

== Systematics and biogeography ==
This genus can be broadly divided into two groups - lineages originating from the colonization of the earliest Canary Islands of Lanzarote, Fuerteventura and Gran Canaria, probably between 10-20 million years ago, and a lineage that colonised the younger western islands probably less than 10 million years ago (Cox et al., 2010). Both lineages contain large and small species.

MtDNA analyses indicate that Lanzarote and Fuerteventura were colonized first and this led to the small body-sized G. atlantica which is present today (Cox et al., 2010). Gran Canaria was the next island to have been colonized from Lanzarote/Fuerteventura, giving rise to the large body-sized species, G. stehlini (Cox et al., 2010). Finally, the clade that colonized the younger western islands was likely to have originated from Lanzarote/Fuerteventura. This western island clade diverged into two groups, all of which colonized Tenerife, La Palma, La Gomera and El Hierro, leading to 1) a medium-bodied (e.g., G. caesaris from El Hierro) and 2) a large bodied "giant" species (e.g., G. simonyi from El Hierro) on each of these islands (note that G. intermedia from Tenerife belongs to the "giant" group, but present-day individuals are not that large). The giant species now exist, at best, in small relict populations, while G. auritae may be extinct on La Palma.

Prehistoric remains were assigned to the taxa G. goliath and G. maxima, the former supposedly occurring on several islands, the latter only on Tenerife. It was eventually determined, however, that G. maxima is a junior synonym of G. goliath, and that the latter was very close to G. simonyi; supposed G. goliath specimens from El Hierro, La Gomera, and La Palma are probably just extremely large individuals of, respectively, G. simonyi, G. bravoana, and G. auaritae (Barahona et al. 2000). However, a mummified giant specimen from Tenerife yielded ancient DNA remains, and by analysis of this, it was concluded that G. goliath is a valid species that probably was restricted to Tenerife, and apparently was closer to G. intermedia than to G. simonyi (Maca-Meyer et al. 2003).

Distribution of small, large, and giant species of Gallotia, going west to east. Extant, not endangered = blue. Extant, critically endangered = purple. Extinct = red. Introduced = gray.
	El Hierro	La Palma	La Gomera	Tenerife	Gran Canaria	Fuerteventura	Lanzarote
Small	G. caesaris	G. galloti	G. caesaris	G. galloti	G. atlantica	G. atlantica	G. atlantica
Large				G. intermedia			
Giant	G. simonyi	G. auaritae	G. bravoana	G. goliath	G. stehlini	G. stehlini	

Basal group

- Gallotia atlantica - Atlantic lizard
  - Gallotia atlantica atlantica
  - Gallotia atlantica mahoratae
- Gallotia stehlini - Gran Canaria giant lizard

Western clade
Large species

- Gallotia simonyi - Simony's lizard
  - Gallotia simonyi simonyi - Roque Chico de Salmor giant lizard, extinct (c.1930s)
  - Gallotia simonyi machadoi - El Hierro giant lizard
- Gallotia bravoana - La Gomera giant lizard, formerly G. (simonyi) gomerana and G. simonyi bravoana (Miras & Pérez-Mellado 2005a)
- Gallotia auaritae - La Palma giant lizard
- Gallotia goliath - Tenerife giant lizard, subfossil; includes G. maxima
- Gallotia intermedia - Tenerife speckled lizard

Small species

- Gallotia caesaris - Boettger's lizard
  - Gallotia caesaris caesaris
  - Gallotia caesaris gomerae
- Gallotia galloti - Tenerife lizard or Western Canaries lizard
  - Gallotia galloti eisentrauti
  - Gallotia galloti galloti
  - Gallotia galloti insulanagae
  - Gallotia galloti palmae
