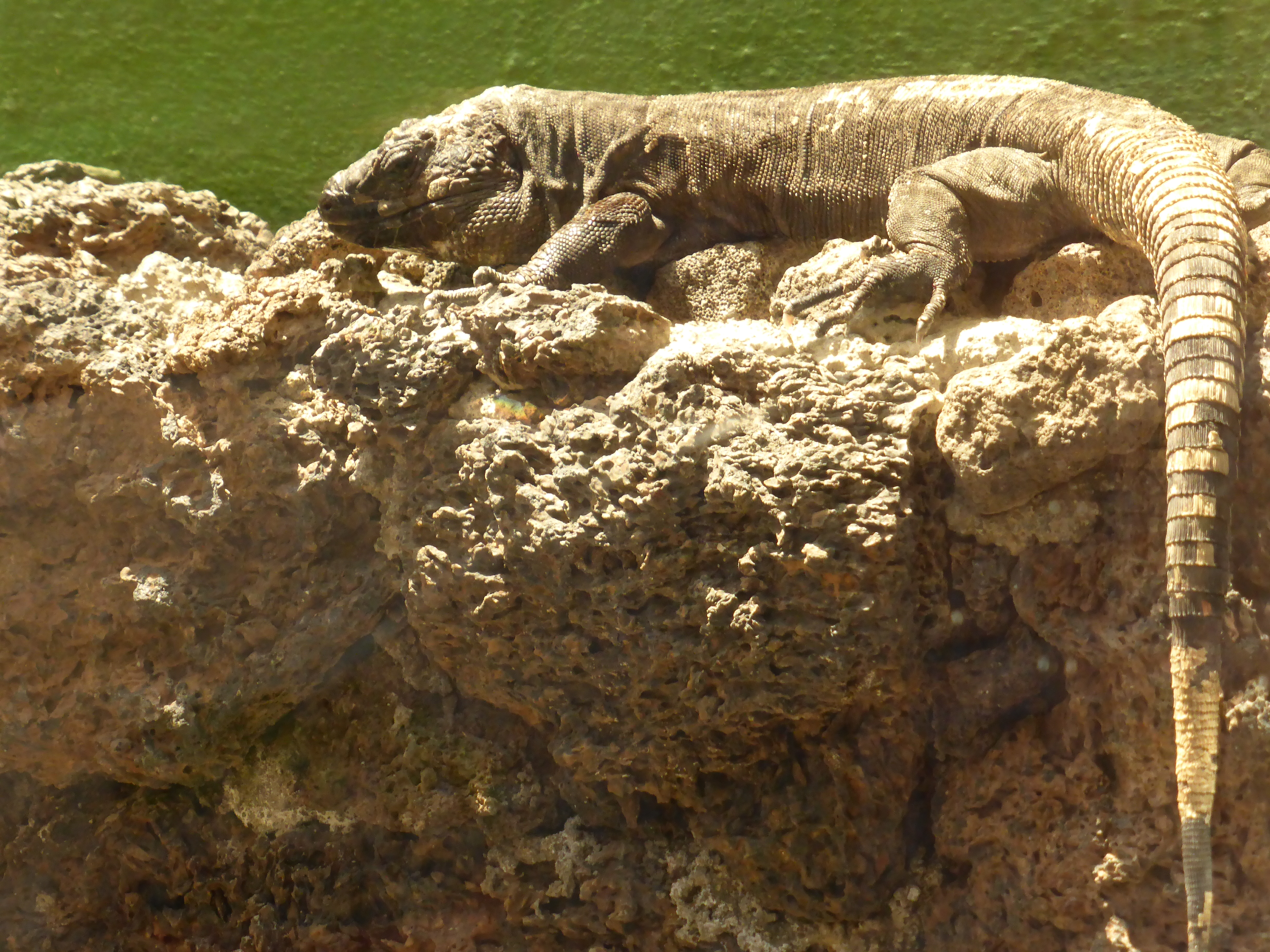
- El Hierro giant lizard (Gallotia simonyi machadoi)

Conservation status
- Vulnerable (IUCN 3.1)
- CITES Appendix I (CITES)

Scientific classification
- Kingdom: Animalia
- Phylum: Chordata
- Class: Reptilia
- Order: Squamata
- Suborder: Lacertoidea
- Family: Lacertidae
- Genus: Gallotia
- Species: G. simonyi

Binomial name
- Gallotia simonyi (Steindachner, 1889)

Synonyms
- See text

= Simony's giant lizard =

Simony's giant lizard Temporal range: 0.85–0 Ma Early Pleistocene–Recent

Species of lizard

Simony's giant lizard (Gallotia simonyi) is a large species of wall lizard endemic to the island of El Hierro and nearby islet Roque Chico de Salmor in the Canary Islands.

== Etymology ==
The specific name, simonyi, honors Viennese naturalist Oskar Simony (1852–1915), who collected the three individuals used to describe the species on Roque Chico de Salmor, in 1889.

== Taxonomy ==
=== Subspecies ===
Two subspecies are recognised:

- The Roque Chico de Salmor giant lizard, Gallotia simonyi simonyi, extinct since 1931.
- The El Hierro giant lizard, Gallotia simonyi machadoi, discovered in 1975 in an area of less than four hectares of Fuga de Gorreta, north of the island. Since 1999, it has been introduced to Roque Chico de Salmor and other parts of El Hierro, but is still classified as critically endangered.

=== Evolution ===
The genus Gallotia appeared on the eastern Canary Islands, older geologically, and expanded west as new islands emerged. Simony's giant lizard evolved from the La Gomera giant lizard after it colonized El Hierro less than 0,85 million years ago. Mitochondrial DNA studies suggest that the two subspecies separated recently, due to rising sea levels at the end of the Pleistocene. Judging from subfossil remains, Simony's giant lizard was much larger before the Guanches colonized El Hierro at the end of the first millennium BC, with some individuals estimated to have surpassed one meter in total length.

== Description ==
Roque Chico de Salmor giant lizard.

The species is very robust. Nasal openings touch the rostral, first supralabial, and postnasal. Five supralabials are usually before the subocular. Large temporal scales, between 25 and 81 in number. Two very large supratemporal scales. Maseteric and tympanic are present but small. The collar is serrated and made of 10 to 17 scales. There are 80-103 dorsal scales, small and on the center of the body. Ventral scales are almost square in shape, and present in 18-22 longitudinal series.

Adults are black colored, with lighter legs and tail, and some light spots over the lips and the temporal region. The sides of the body have six to eight yellow ocelli, sometimes with a second row below. Ocelli are larger and more numerous in males than in females. The belly is dark brown, somewhat lighter in the external ventral scales and the posterior section of the belly. The submaxilar is black, with light spots and longitudial dark bands in the gular region. Juveniles are lighter colored than adults, with the anterior part of the back brown-reddish and the posterior gray-brown. They also have numerous ocelli on the back: yellow, green, or blueish.

The species has 40 chromosomes. Males are generally larger than females, but also have proportionally larger head and longer legs. The species grows and reproduces for life, which results in decreased size when animals are subjected to predation and prevented from reaching their full adult size. The extinct nominate subspecies was slightly larger than the one from the mainland, even when the latter is raised in captivity without the action of predators.
