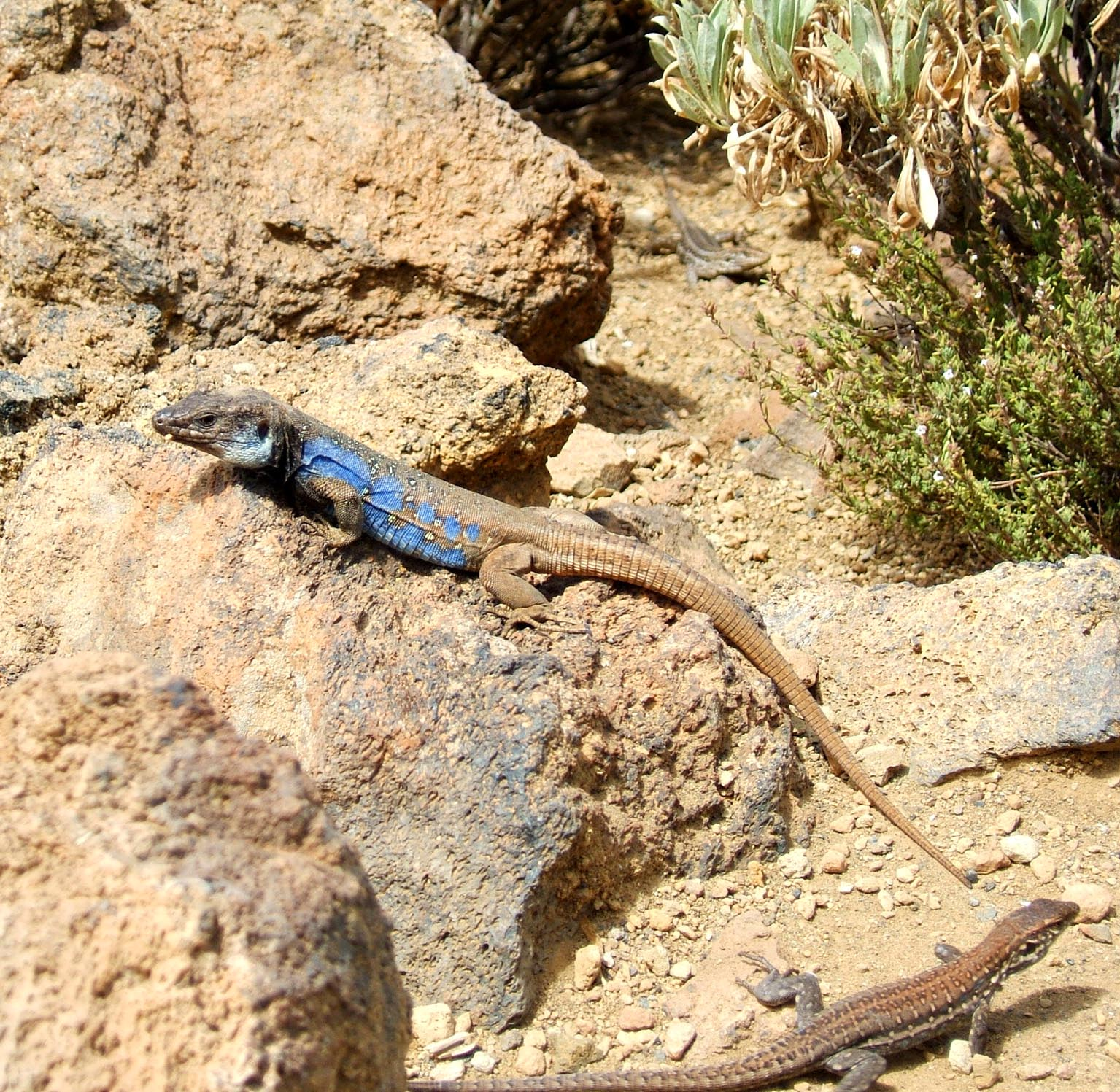
- Southern Tenerife lizard, Gallotia galloti galloti, male (top) and female (bottom)

Conservation status
- Least Concern (IUCN 3.1)

Scientific classification
- Kingdom: Animalia
- Phylum: Chordata
- Class: Reptilia
- Order: Squamata
- Family: Lacertidae
- Genus: Gallotia
- Species: G. galloti

Binomial name
- Gallotia galloti (Oudart, 1839)

= Gallotia galloti =

Species of lizard

Gallotia galloti, also known commonly as Gallot's lizard, the Tenerife lizard, and the Western Canaries lizard, is a species of wall lizard in the genus Gallotia. The species is native to the Canary Islands of Tenerife and La Palma. Unlike most larger species of its genus, G. galloti is a commonly found animal. There are four recognized subspecies.

== Taxonomy ==
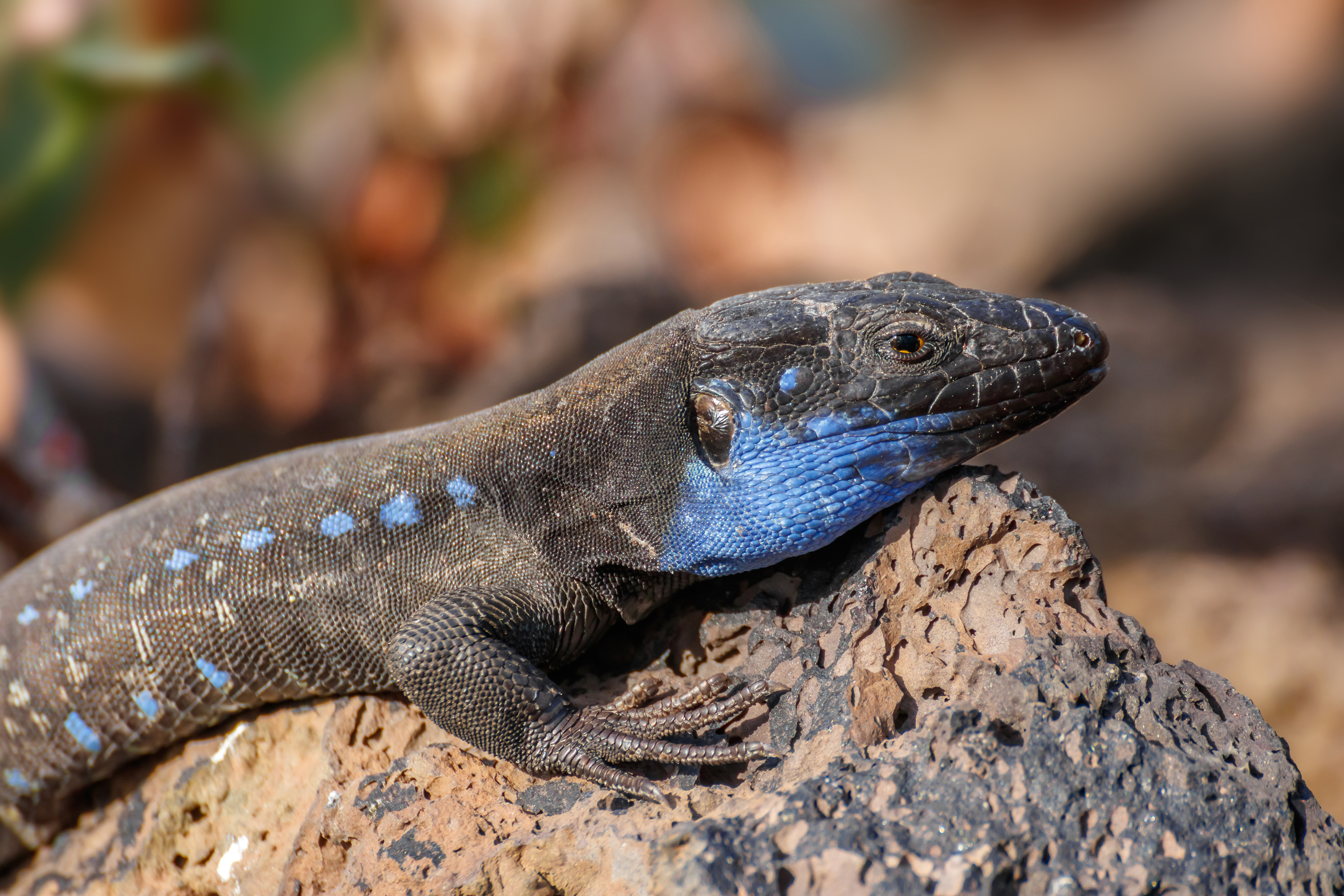
Close-up of Gallotia galloti palmae (male)

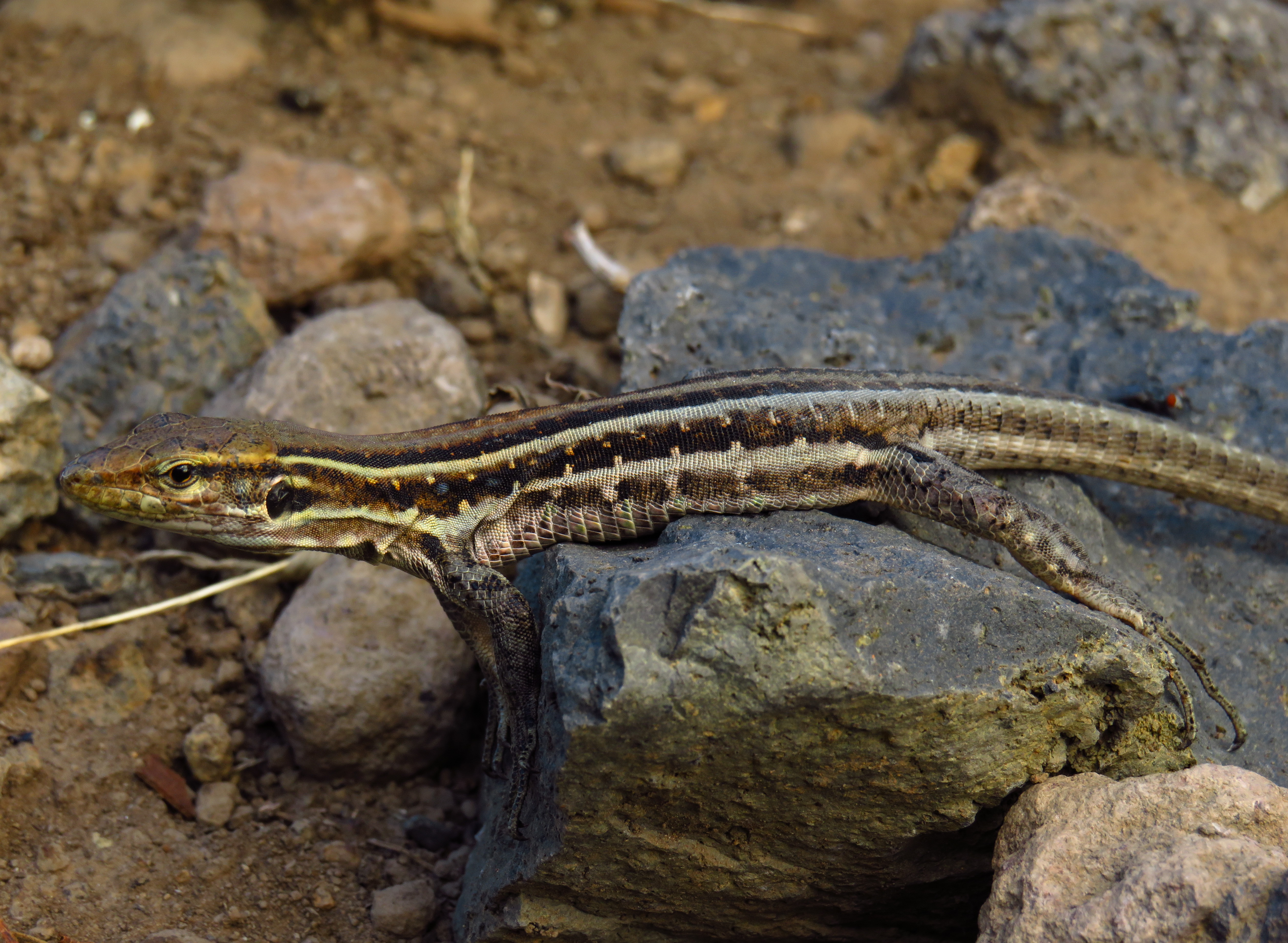
Gallotia galloti ssp. eisentrauti (female)

Both the generic name, Gallotia, and the specific name, galloti, are in honor of D. Gallot, an amateur naturalist, who collected the type specimen.

The species G. galloti belongs to the western clade of the genus Gallotia. The differences in color pattern in adult males form the basis for the recognition of the northern and southern subspecies. The closest relative of G. galloti is the smaller Boettger's lizard, which occurs on El Hierro and La Gomera (Maca-Meyer et al. 2003).

== Subspecies ==
Four subspecies are recognized as being valid, including the nominotypical subspecies.

- Gallotia galloti eisentrauti Bischoff, 1982 – Northern Tenerife lizard (northern Tenerife)
- Gallotia galloti galloti (Oudart, 1839) – Southern Tenerife lizard (central and southern Tenerife, including Teide)
- Gallotia galloti insulanagae Martín, 1985 – Anaga lizard (Roque de Fuera de Anaga, offshore the Macizo de Anaga mountains, northeastern Tenerife)
- Gallotia galloti palmae (Boettger & L. Müller, 1914) – La Palma lizard (La Palma)

Nota bene: A trinomial authority in parentheses indicates that the subspecies was originally described in a genus other than Gallotia.

== Description ==
The males of the species G. galloti are larger than the females, with strong males reaching up to 40 centimetres (16 in) (snout-to-tail). Adult males of the G. galloti palmae subspecies reach a maximum of only 30 centimetres (12 in) in length. Adult males of all subspecies have characteristic pale blue patches along the head and flank, sometimes with blue spots on the body.

G. galloti is among the smaller species of the western clade, as the giant species (G. auaritae, G. bravoana, G. goliath, G. simonyi, and G. stehlini) can reach up to double that length.

== Behavior ==
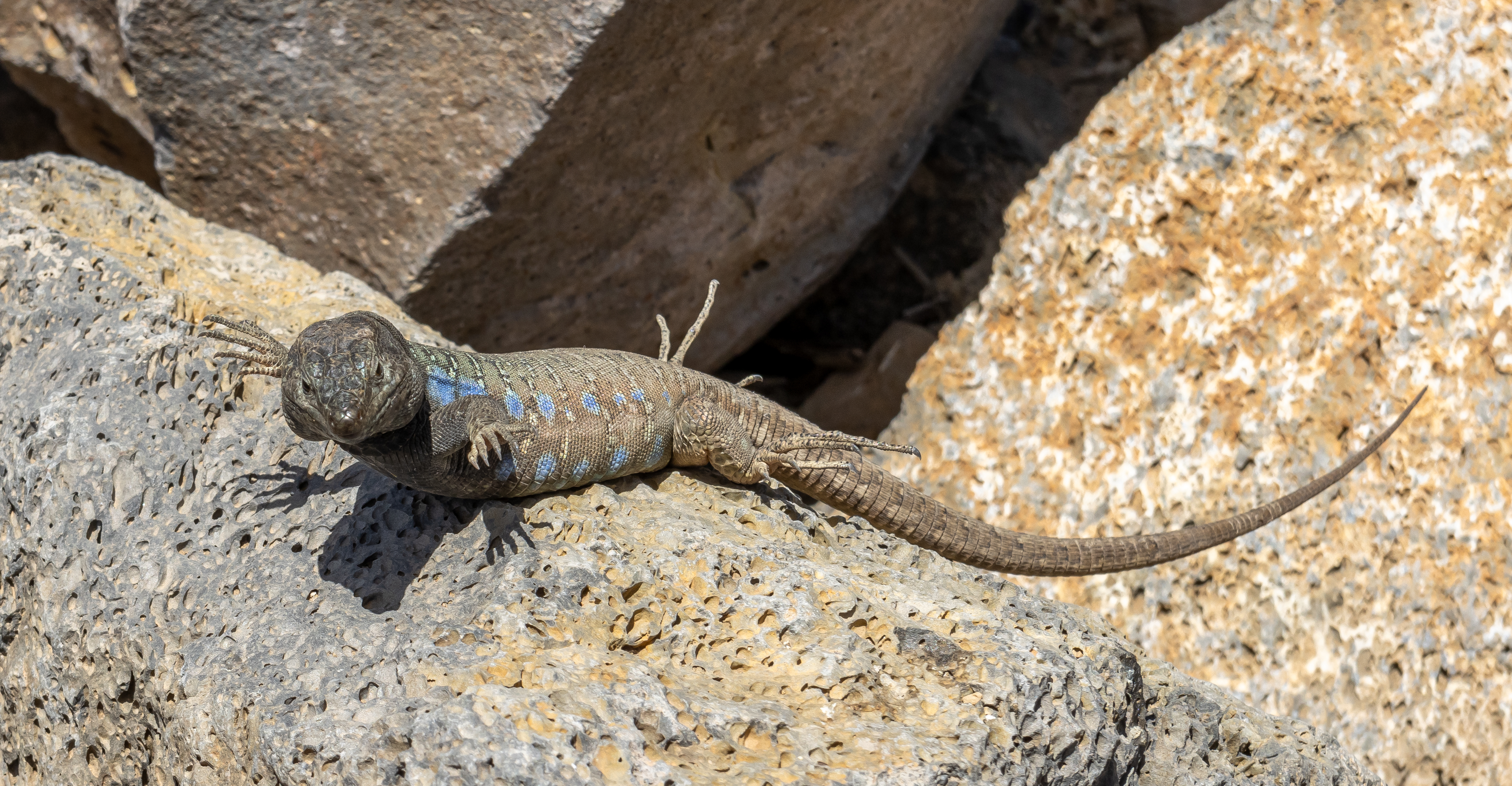
With raised legs due to a hot surface

The species G. galloti is diurnal. It feeds mainly on the leaves, buds, flowers, nectar and fruit of plants within its habitat, which makes it a major pollinator and seed disperser. It also eats insects and other invertebrates. It breeds between April and August. It lays 3-6 eggs in clutches. Its main predator is the feral cat; other predators include the common kestrel and the common raven.

The striking color of adult males and their curious nature endear them to many people. At popular sights such as Teide National Park, the lizards have become somewhat habituated to people. As it likes to eat ripe fruit, it can even be considered a nuisance in vineyards and orchards and is thus occasionally trapped or poisoned. Local populations may thus decline, but no subspecies are currently considered to be endangered.

== Distribution and habitat ==
Though it prefers dry, sunny places, G. galloti is found in all habitats in the western Canary Islands, from sea level up to an altitude of 3,000 metres (9,800 ft).

The northern form is found at lower altitudes on the north-facing slopes, while the southern form is found above the pine forest on the north-facing slopes and the southern slopes of Tenerife. A recent genomic study has identified nuclear DNA differences between these regions, although they only seem to be found in a small number of loci.

Due to its small area of occurrence, G. g. insulanagae is considered a vulnerable taxon, but it seems safe at present as its habitat is fairly inaccessible and included in the Parque Rural de Anaga (Blanco & González 1992).
