= Caesar Rudolf Boettger =

German zoologist

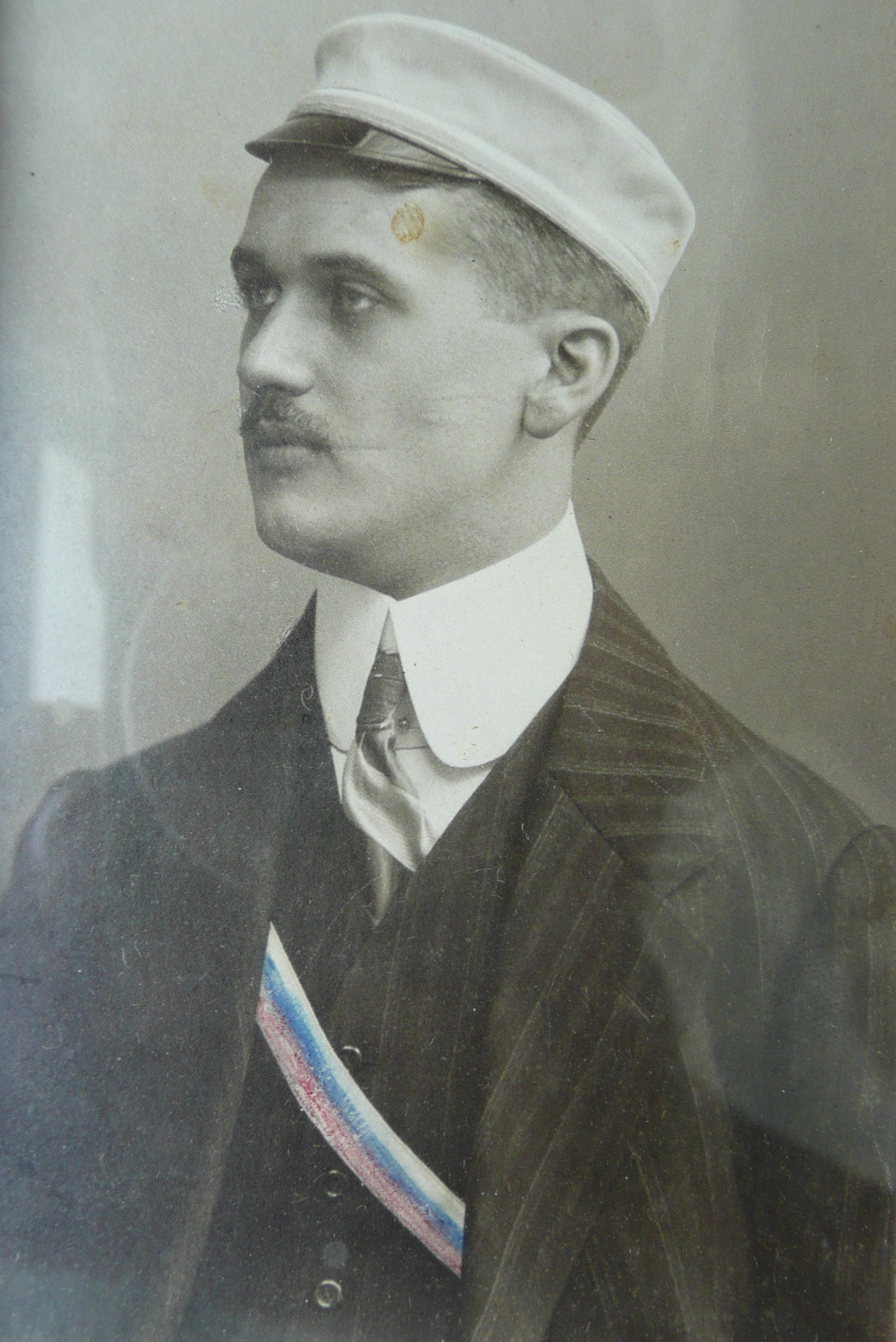
- Caesar Rudolf Boettger (1909), showing dueling scars from academic fencing
- Born: 20 May 1888
- Died: 8 September 1976 (aged 88)
- Education: University of Bonn
- Scientific career
- Fields: malacology

Caesar Rudolf Boettger (20 May 1888 – 8 September 1976) was a German zoologist born in Frankfurt am Main. He specialized in malacology, particularly studying the land snails and slugs.

In 1912 he obtained his PhD from the University of Bonn, and in 1914 embarked on a scientific expedition to Africa and the Orient. During World War I, he was stationed in France and Turkey. In 1932 he became a private lecturer at the University of Berlin, where in 1938 he was appointed professor of zoology. In 1947 he became a professor of zoology at Braunschweig University of Technology, where he established a museum of natural history.

After retirement in 1956, he undertook five research trips to North America (including Mexico and Hawaii). In 1965 he was visiting curator at the University of Michigan and in 1967/68 took part in a research project of the Naval Medical Field Research Laboratory in North Carolina. Boettger has over a dozen species named after him, as well as a gastropod genus:

- Boettgerilla Simroth, 1910.

Caesar Boettger is commemorated in the scientific name of a species of lizard, Gallotia caesaris.

He was a nephew of German herpetologist Oskar Boettger.

== Bibliography ==
- Die Landschneckenfauna der Aru- und der Kei-Inseln (Land snails of the Aru and Kei Islands); (Treatises of the Senckenberg Nature Research Society, Volume 338), Frankfurt am Main 1922.
- Die subterrane Molluskenfauna Belgiens, (Subterranean mollusks of Belgium), Brüssels 1939.
- Die Stämme des Tierreichs in ihrer systematischen Gliederung, Braunschweig (Vieweg), 1952.
- Die Haustiere Afrikas, (Animals of Africa), Jena (VEB G. Fischer), 1958.
