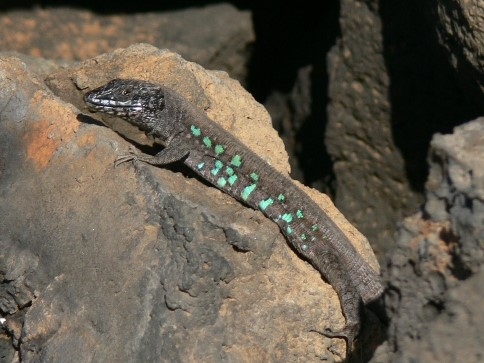
- Gallotia atlantica atlantica

Conservation status
- Least Concern (IUCN 3.1)

Scientific classification
- Kingdom: Animalia
- Phylum: Chordata
- Class: Reptilia
- Order: Squamata
- Suborder: Lacertoidea
- Family: Lacertidae
- Genus: Gallotia
- Species: G. atlantica

Binomial name
- Gallotia atlantica (Peters & Doria, 1882)

= Atlantic lizard =

Species of lizard

The Atlantic lizard (Gallotia atlantica) is a species of lizards in the family Lacertidae. It is endemic to the eastern Canary Islands Lanzarote and Fuerteventura and the smaller islands surrounding them.

Its natural habitats are temperate forests, temperate shrubland, Mediterranean-type shrubby vegetation, rocky areas, rocky shores, sandy shores, arable land, pastureland, and rural gardens.
