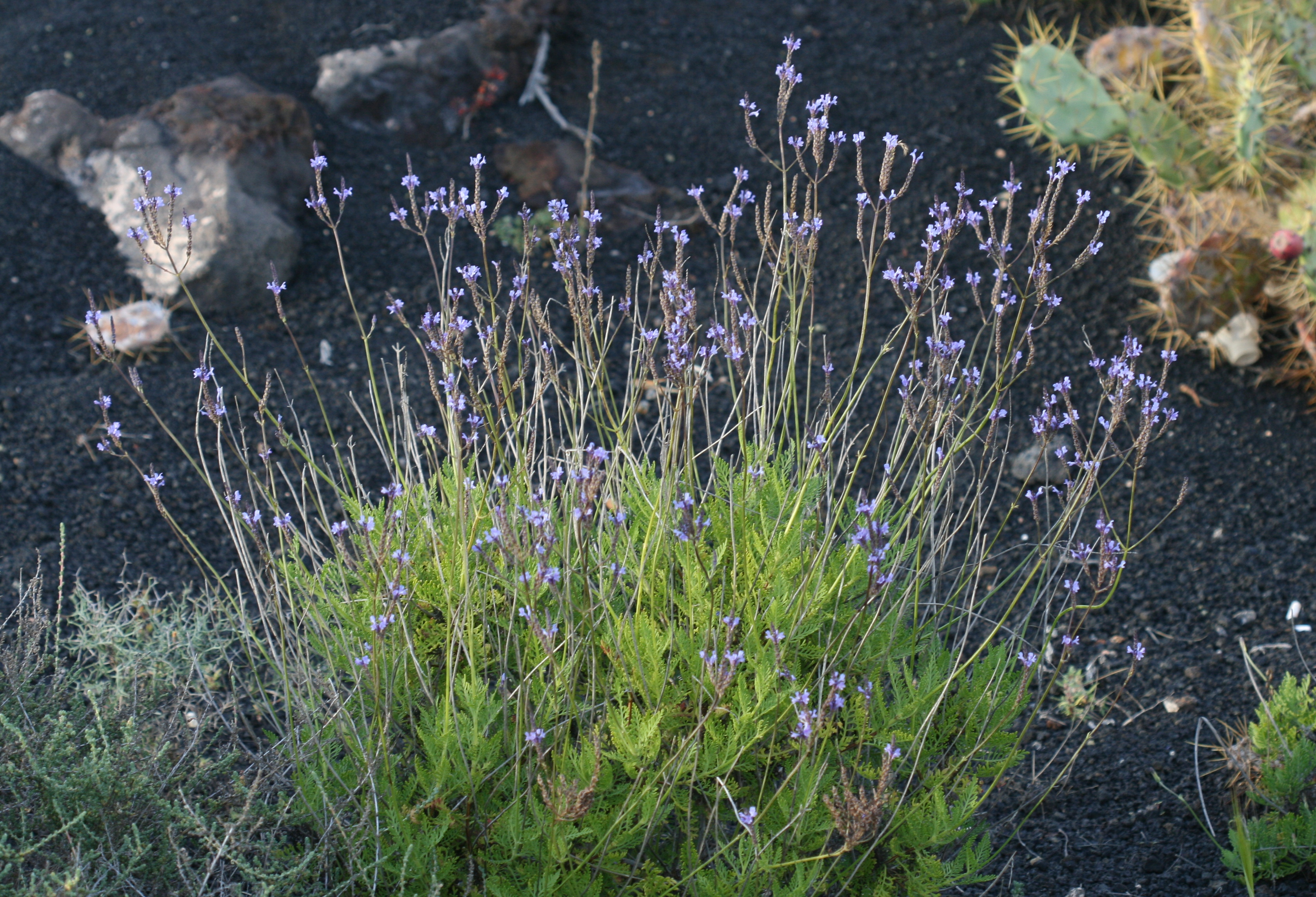
- In habitat, Playa Blanca, Lanzarote

Scientific classification
- Kingdom: Plantae
- Clade: Tracheophytes
- Clade: Angiosperms
- Clade: Eudicots
- Clade: Asterids
- Order: Lamiales
- Family: Lamiaceae
- Genus: Lavandula
- Species: L. canariensis

Binomial name
- Lavandula canariensis Mill.

= Lavandula canariensis =

Species of plant

Lavandula canariensis (common name, Canary Island lavender) is a species of flowering plant in the family Lamiaceae, native to the Canary Islands. It was first described by Philip Miller in 1768.

== Description ==
Lavandula canariensis is a half-hardy, woody, evergreen shrub. The leaves are bipinnate, rich green, and covered in fine, downy hairs. Flowers appear in spikes of small, fragrant blue, opening from dark purple buds, and are borne on branching stems in summer.

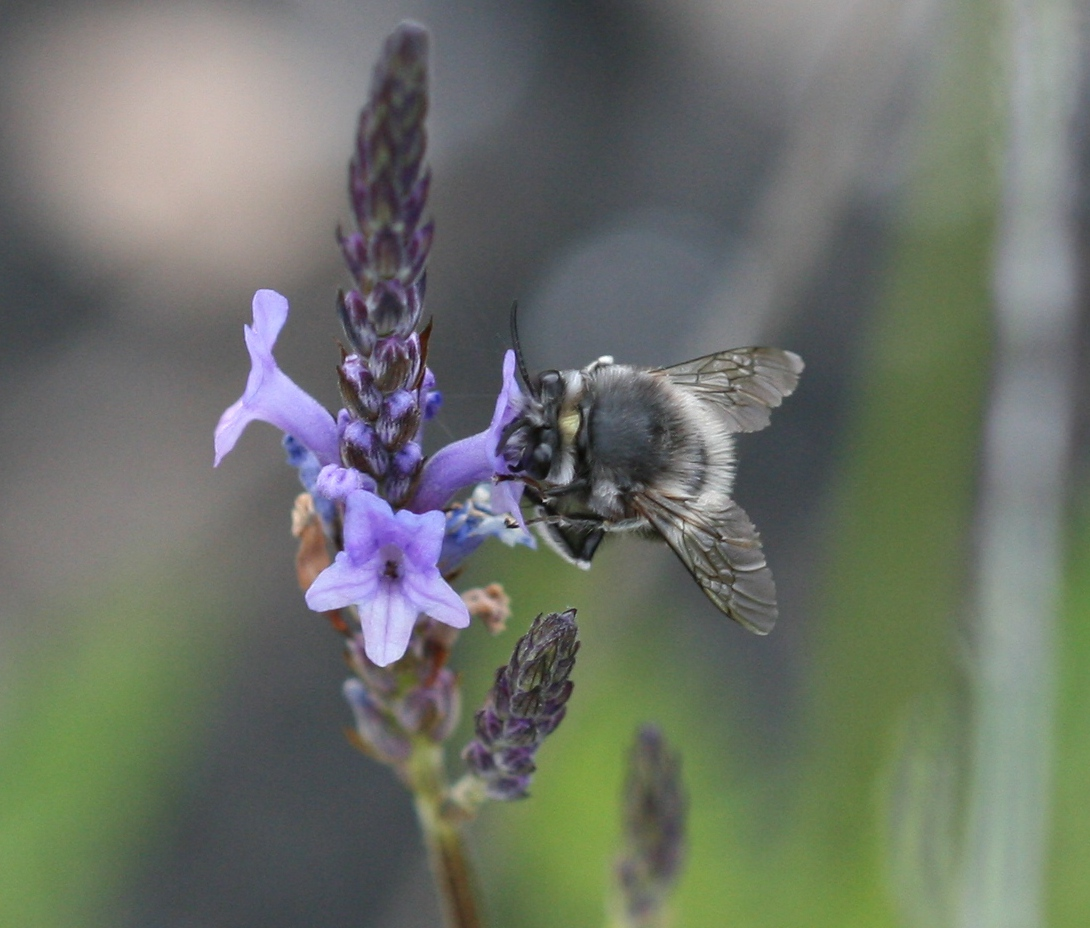
Flowers with pollinator (Anthophora alluaudi)
