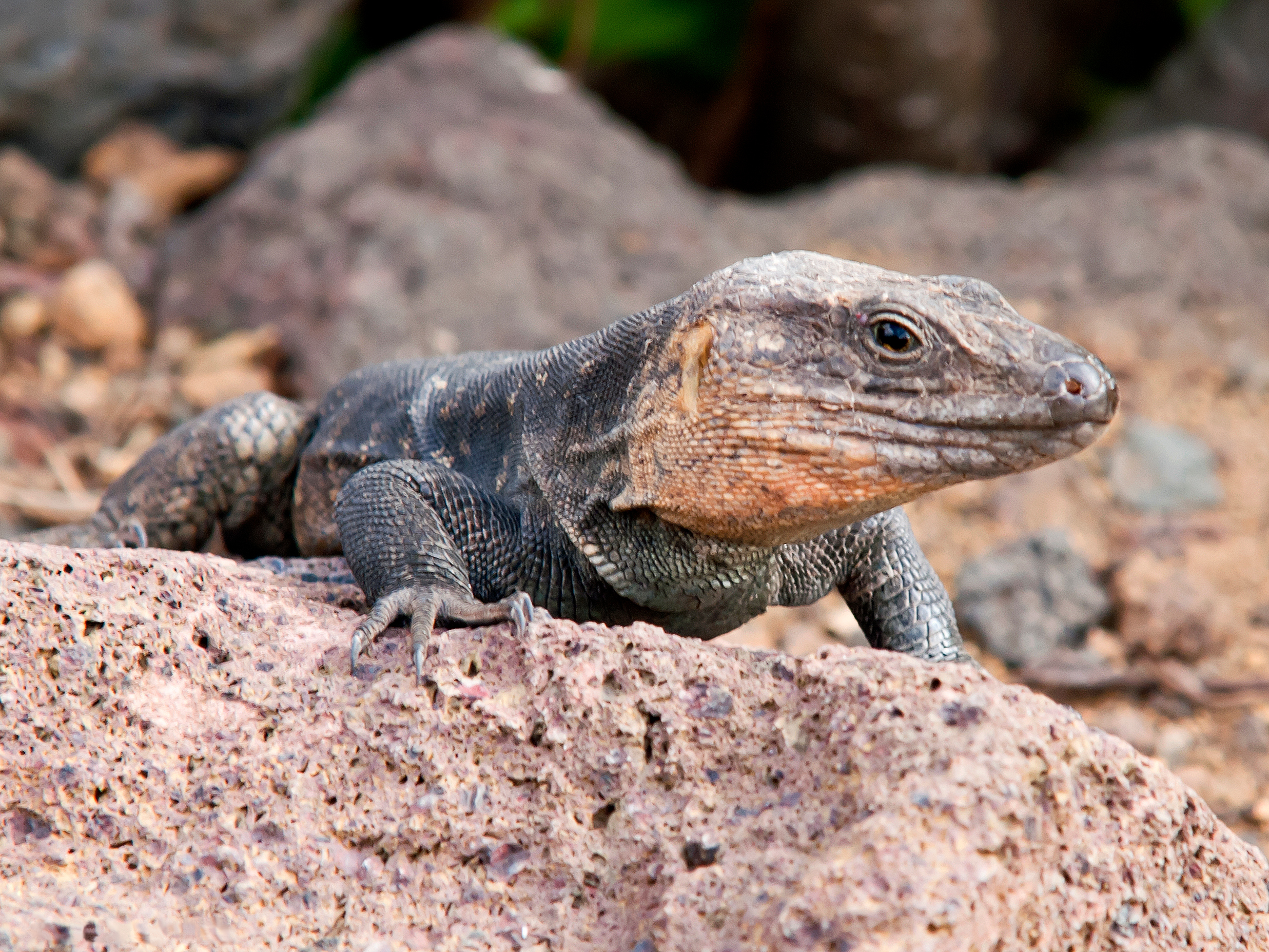
- On Gran Canaria, Canary Islands, Spain

Conservation status
- Critically Endangered (IUCN 3.1)

Scientific classification
- Kingdom: Animalia
- Phylum: Chordata
- Class: Reptilia
- Order: Squamata
- Family: Lacertidae
- Genus: Gallotia
- Species: G. stehlini

Binomial name
- Gallotia stehlini (Schenkel-Haas, 1901)

Synonyms
- Lacerta galloti var. stehlini Schenkel, 1901; Lacerta stehlini — Boulenger, 1920; Lacerta simonyi stehlini — Mertens, 1928; Lacerta stehlini — Kramer, 1979; Gallotia stehlini — Hernández et al., 2000

= Gran Canaria giant lizard =

Species of lizard

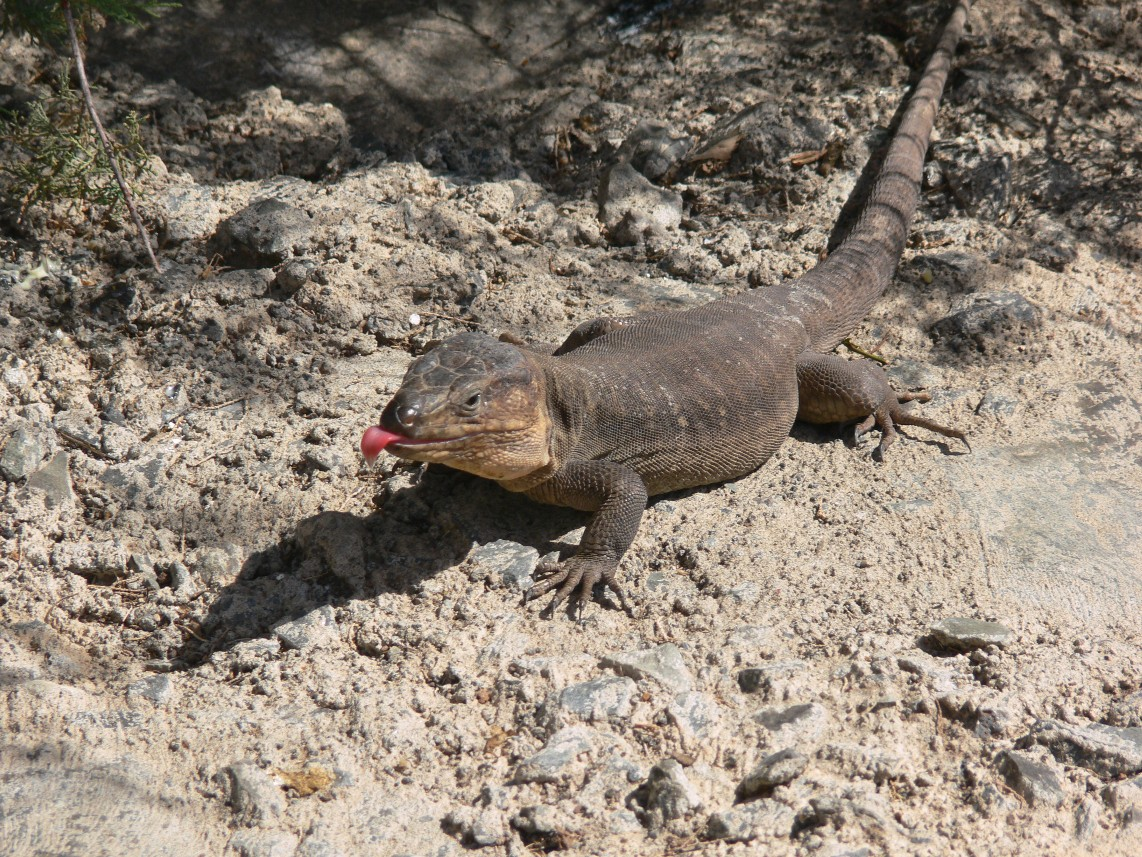
Gran Canaria giant lizard

The Gran Canaria giant lizard (Gallotia stehlini) is a species of lizard in the family Lacertidae. The species is found in the Canary Islands.

== Etymology ==
The specific name, stehlini, is in honor of Swiss paleontologist Hans Georg Stehlin, who collected the holotype.

== Description ==
G. stehlini grows to a total length (including tail) of up to 80 cm (31 in). It is among the largest reptiles within the family Lacertidae. The species comes in a variety of grays, browns, and reddish hues. Unlike their female counterparts, males exhibit sizable jowls, robust heads and overall greater body mass.

== Diet ==
G. stehlini is a true omnivore. The young often consume various invertebrates, vegetation and soft fruits. As they mature, their diet largely consists of plant matter.

== Geographic range ==
G. stehlini is endemic to Gran Canaria in the Canary Islands of Spain but it has been introduced to Fuerteventura.

== Habitat ==
The natural habitats of G. stehlini are temperate shrubland, Mediterranean-type shrubby vegetation, rocky areas, rocky shores, and pastureland, at altitudes from sea level to 1,850 m (6,070 ft).

== Reproduction ==
G. stehlini is oviparous.

== Conservation Status ==
The Gran Canaria Giant Lizard is listed by the IUCN as Critically Endangered as of July 2024, due to the introduction of California kingsnake.
