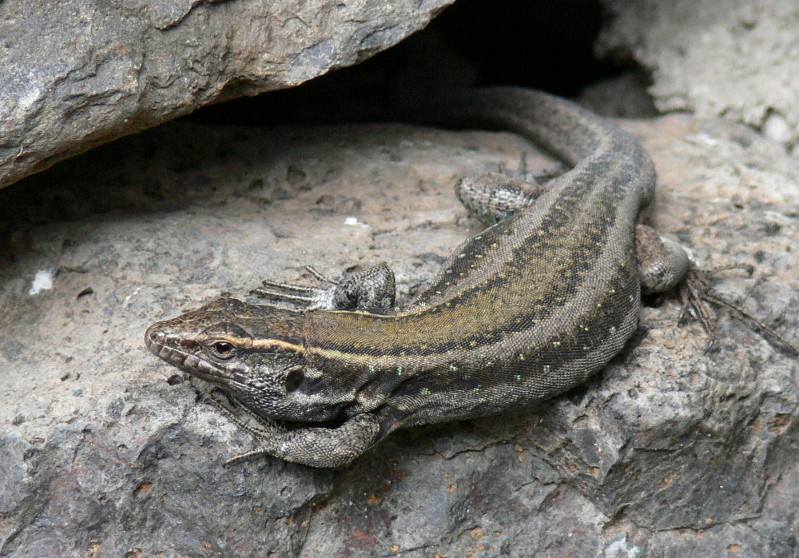
- Young female of Gallotia caesaris gomerae

Conservation status
- Least Concern (IUCN 3.1)

Scientific classification
- Kingdom: Animalia
- Phylum: Chordata
- Class: Reptilia
- Order: Squamata
- Family: Lacertidae
- Genus: Gallotia
- Species: G. caesaris

Binomial name
- Gallotia caesaris (Lehrs, 1914)

Synonyms
- Lacerta caesaris Lehrs, 1914; Lacerta galloti caesaris — C. Boettger & L. Müller, 1914; Gallotia galloti caesaris — Bischoff, 1985; Gallotia caesaris — Bannert, 1998

= Boettger's lizard =

Species of lizard

Boettger's lizard (Gallotia caesaris) is a species of wall lizard in the family Lacertidae. The species is endemic to the Canary Islands. There are two recognized subspecies.

== Etymology ==
The specific name, caesaris, is in honor of German malacologist Caesar Rudolf Boettger, who was a nephew of German herpetologist Oskar Boettger.

== Geographic range ==
G. caesaris is native to two of the western Canary Islands, El Hierro and La Gomera. On the neighboring islands Tenerife and La Palma it is replaced by its close relative Gallotia galloti. G. caesaris has been introduced by humans on the Portuguese island of Madeira.

== Habitat ==
The preferred natural habitats of G. caesaris are rocky areas, shrubland, and forest, at altitudes from sea level to 1,500 m (4,900 ft).

== Reproduction ==
G. caesaris is oviparous. A sexually mature female may lay three clutches per year, and each clutch may contain 1–5 eggs.

== Subspecies ==
Two subspecies are recognized as being valid, including the nominotypical subspecies:

- Gallotia caesaris caesaris (Lehrs, 1914) – El Hierro
- Gallotia caesaris gomerae (C. Boettger & L. Müller, 1914) – La Gomera

Nota bene: A trinomial authority in parentheses indicates that the subspecies was originally described in a genus other than Gallotia.
