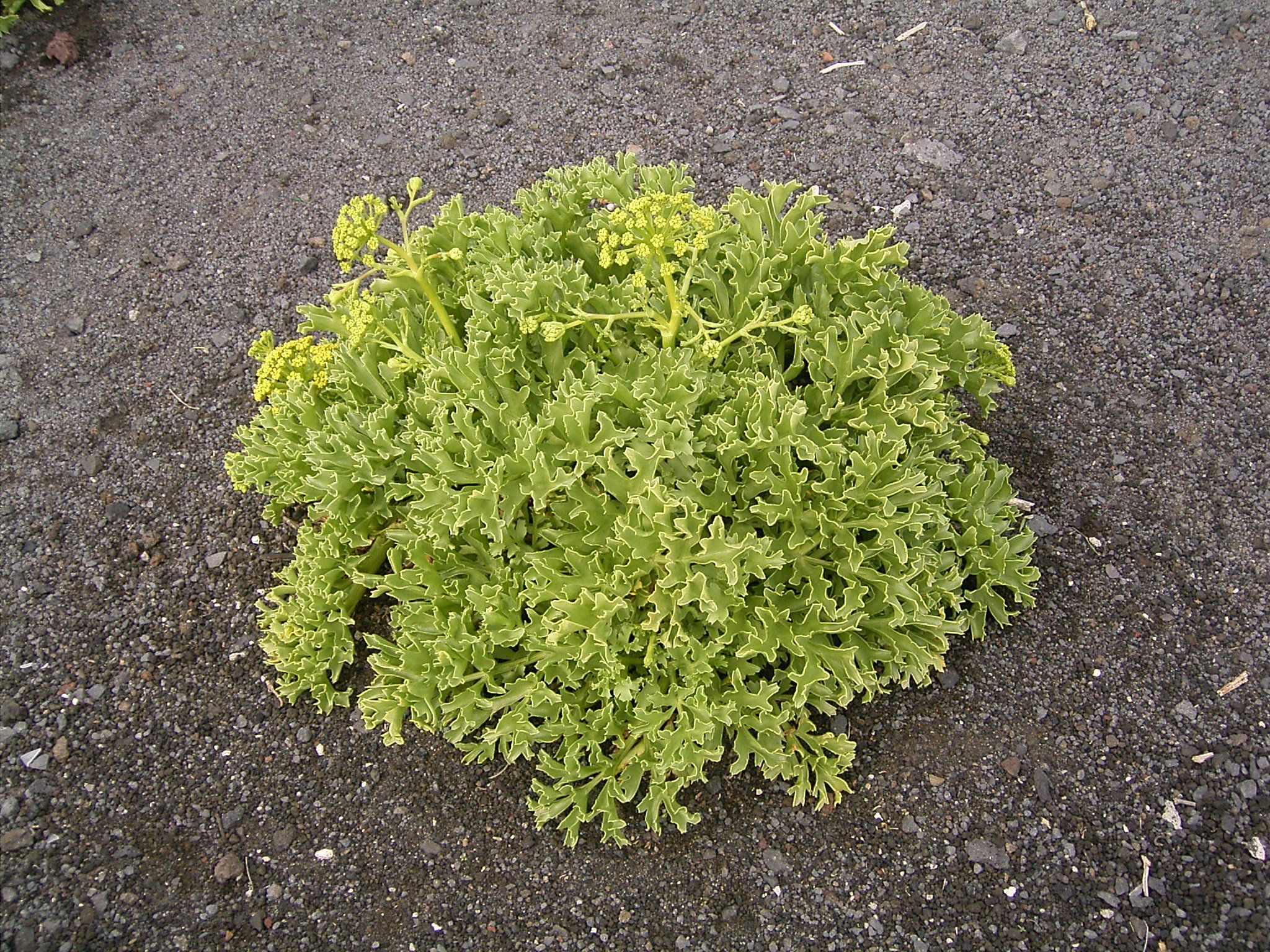

Scientific classification
- Kingdom: Plantae
- Clade: Tracheophytes
- Clade: Angiosperms
- Clade: Eudicots
- Clade: Asterids
- Order: Apiales
- Family: Apiaceae
- Subfamily: Apioideae
- Tribe: Annesorhizeae
- Genus: Astydamia; DC.

Species
- Astydamia canariensis; Astydamia latifolia

= Astydamia =

Genus of flowering plants

Astydamia is a genus of flowering plant in the Apiaceae, with 2 species. It is endemic to Northwest Africa.

It is found on the Canary Islands, Mauritania, Morocco, the Savage Islands and in the Western Sahara.

The genus name of Astydamia is in honour of Astydamia (from Greek mythology), the wife of Acastus, son of Pelias. It was first described and published in Coll. Mém. Vol.5 on page 53 in 1829.

Plants of the World Online only accepts Astydamia latifolia (L.f.) Baill.
