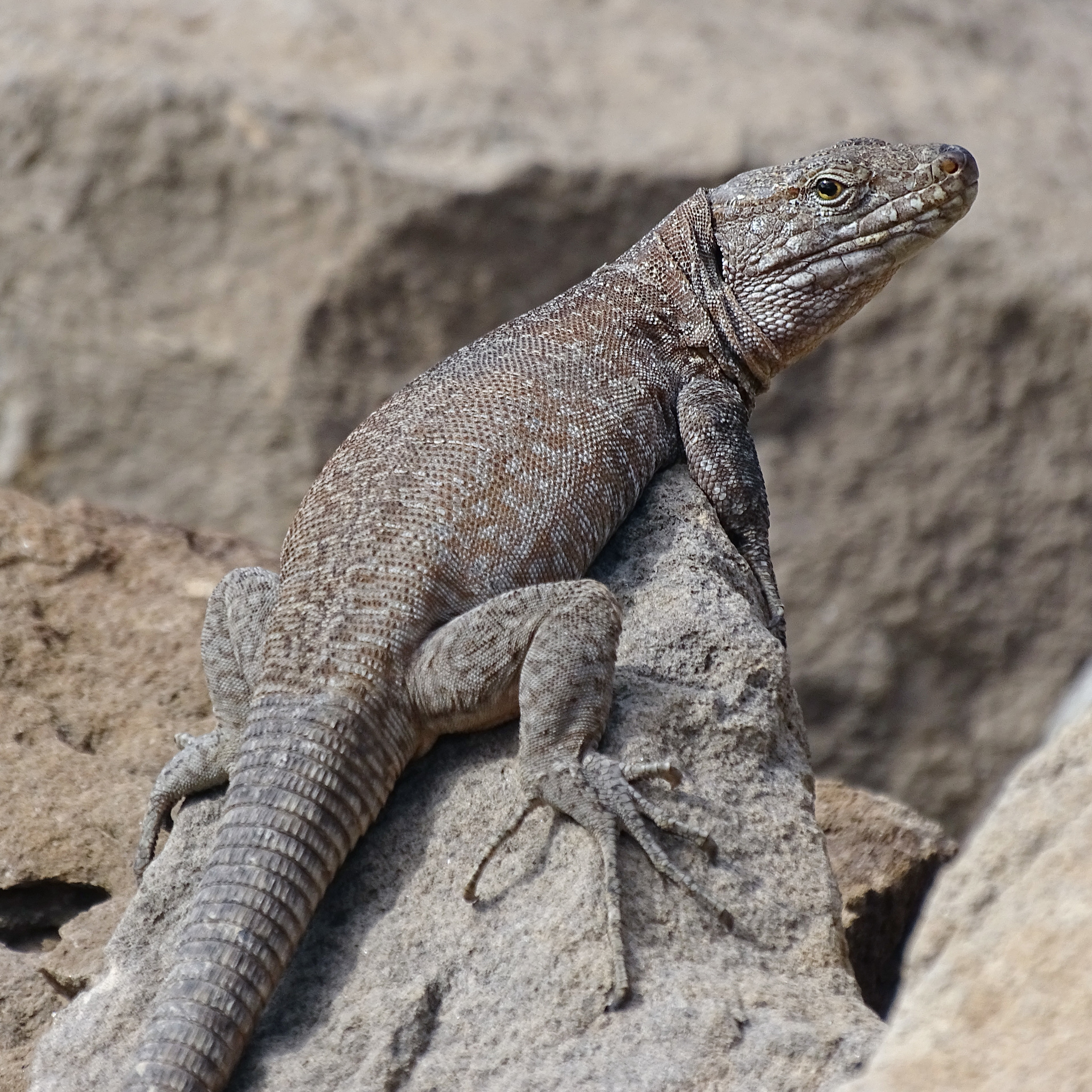

Conservation status
- Critically Endangered (IUCN 3.1)

Scientific classification
- Kingdom: Animalia
- Phylum: Chordata
- Class: Reptilia
- Order: Squamata
- Family: Lacertidae
- Genus: Gallotia
- Species: G. intermedia

Binomial name
- Gallotia intermedia Barbadillo, Lacomba, Pêrez-Mellado, Sancho & López-Jurado, 1999 (Note: This species was first informally described in 1999 in a field guide, before being more formally described in 2000 by Hernández and colleagues. Whether the first description is valid remains in the grey zone of biological nomenclature.)

= Tenerife speckled lizard =

Tenerife speckled lizard Temporal range: 3–0 Ma Late Pliocene–Recent

Species of lizard

The Tenerife speckled lizard (Gallotia intermedia) is a lacertid (wall lizard) endemic to Tenerife in the Canary Islands. It is the smallest member of the clade containing the western islands' giant species.

It was discovered in 1996 by biologist Efraín Hernández in the Macizo de Teno in the extreme northwest of Tenerife. Although it is believed that the species was once widespread throughout much of the island, nowadays it is only known from a small area of coastline in the extreme west of the island, and also from Montana de Guaza in the extreme south.

The total number of animals in the northwestern distribution area is 500 (estimated in 2008), in 40 isolated populations along altogether 9 km of coastline. In the south, there are about 100 animals. The main threat to this lizard is predation by feral cats and, to a lesser degree, by rats. The lizards are increasing in number since the turn of the century as a result of control of introduced mammals.
