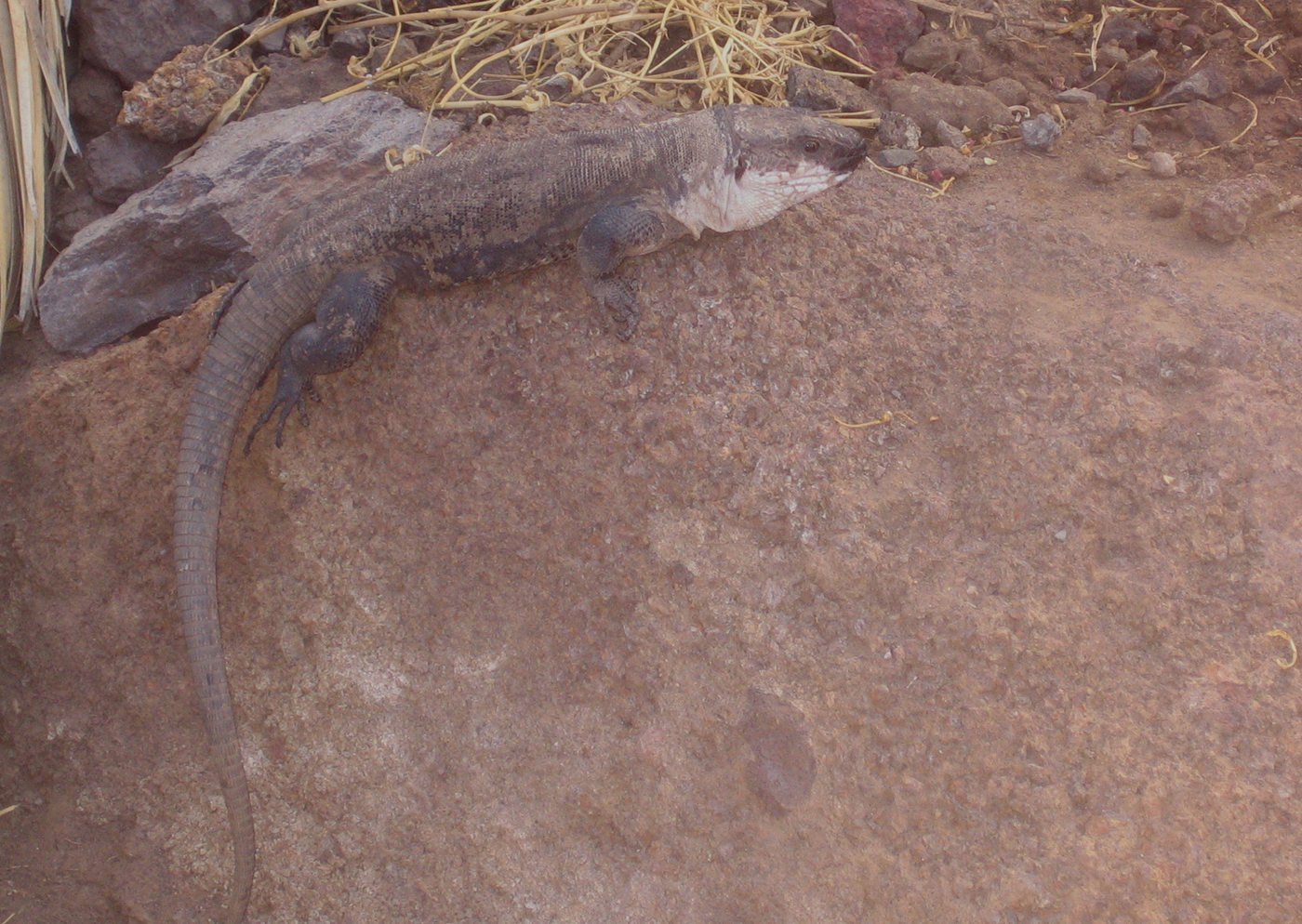

Conservation status
- Endangered (IUCN 3.1)

Scientific classification
- Kingdom: Animalia
- Phylum: Chordata
- Class: Reptilia
- Order: Squamata
- Family: Lacertidae
- Genus: Gallotia
- Species: G. bravoana

Binomial name
- Gallotia bravoana (Hutterer, 1985)

Synonyms
- Gallotia gomerana (Hutterer, 1985); Galliota gomerona (lapsus); Gallotia simonyi bravoana (Hutterer, 1985); Gallotia simonyi gomerana (Hutterer, 1985)

= La Gomera giant lizard =

Species of lizard

The La Gomera giant lizard (Gallotia bravoana) is a lacertid (wall lizard) species that can be found on the island of La Gomera, one of the Canary Islands.

It is easily distinguishable from any other member of Gallotia by the intense white colour that covers its neck, chest and area around the mouth, in spectacular contrast to its dark brown back. This lizard is generally diurnal and mostly herbivorous, and grows up to half a metre long (head and body long). The females lay a single clutch annually of three to seven eggs on average. Its population trend has actually been increasing since 2001.

== Status and conservation ==
Apparent La Gomera giant lizards are listed in reports on La Gomera up to the 19th century, but not thereafter. The species was originally described from subfossil remains in 1985, presumably having gone extinct by then. Spanish biologists led by Juan Carlos Rando rediscovered this species in 1999. The biologists found only six living individuals.

The current population of the La Gomera giant lizard consists of (2004) 90 individuals remaining in the wild, and a captive stock of about 44 animals. This species is now only known from two separate inaccessible cliffs 2 km apart, close to the Valle Gran Rey. The La Gomera giant lizard is thought to have once ranged throughout much of La Gomera and in many habitat types. Nowadays it is found in the Parque Rural de Valle Gran Rey, and the present range is less than one hectare and is restricted to dry cliffs with sparse vegetation.

The La Gomera Giant Lizard is listed as endangered by the IUCN Red List. The species historically declined through overgrazing, hunting, and predation by feral cats and rats. Nowadays the main threats are predation by feral cats, and rock falls within its restricted range. The species is protected by international legislation, and a species recovery plan is in place. On La Gomera, a captive breeding programme has been established in order to increase the number of individuals. To ensure the survival of the remaining populations and facilitate eventual reintroductions, the feral cat population around the species' range will need to be controlled.

== Taxonomy and systematics ==
In his scientific description, the German zoologist R. Hutterer referred the subfossil remains from La Gomera to two subspecies of Gallotia simonyi with the differences being size related. He named these Gallotia simonyi bravoana and Gallotia simonyi gomerana. Bischoff (1998) synonymized them to a single taxon.

Barbadillo et al. (1999) decided for bravoana when they elevated the taxon to species rank. Nogales et al. (2001) concurred as regards species status, but used Gallotia gomerana. Following the ruling of the International Commission on Zoological Nomenclature, gomerana is a junior synonym or bravoana. It is not unequivocally accepted that it does constitute a distinct species; however, in all likelihood, G. simonyi is its closest living relative.
