= List of mammals of the Canary Islands =

This is a list of the mammal species recorded in the Canary Islands, Spain. Since the Osorian shrew (Crocidura osorio) was proven to be actually a population of introduced European greater white-toothed shrew (C. russula) the Canarian shrew, C. canariensis is believed to be the only surviving native terrestrial mammal of the archipelago, every other species now present having been voluntarily or accidentally introduced by humans.

The following tags are used to highlight each species' conservation status as assessed by the International Union for Conservation of Nature.

EX	Extinct	No reasonable doubt that the last individual has died.
EW	Extinct in the wild	Known only to survive in captivity or as a naturalized populations well outside its previous range.
CR	Critically endangered	The species is in imminent risk of extinction in the wild.
EN	Endangered	The species is facing an extremely high risk of extinction in the wild.
VU	Vulnerable	The species is facing a high risk of extinction in the wild.
NT	Near threatened	The species does not meet any of the criteria that would categorise it as risking extinction but it is likely to do so in the future.
LC	Least concern	There are no current identifiable risks to the species.
DD	Data deficient	There is inadequate information to make an assessment of the risks to this species.

== Subclass: Theria ==
=== Infraclass: Eutheria ===
==== Order: Rodentia (rodents) ====
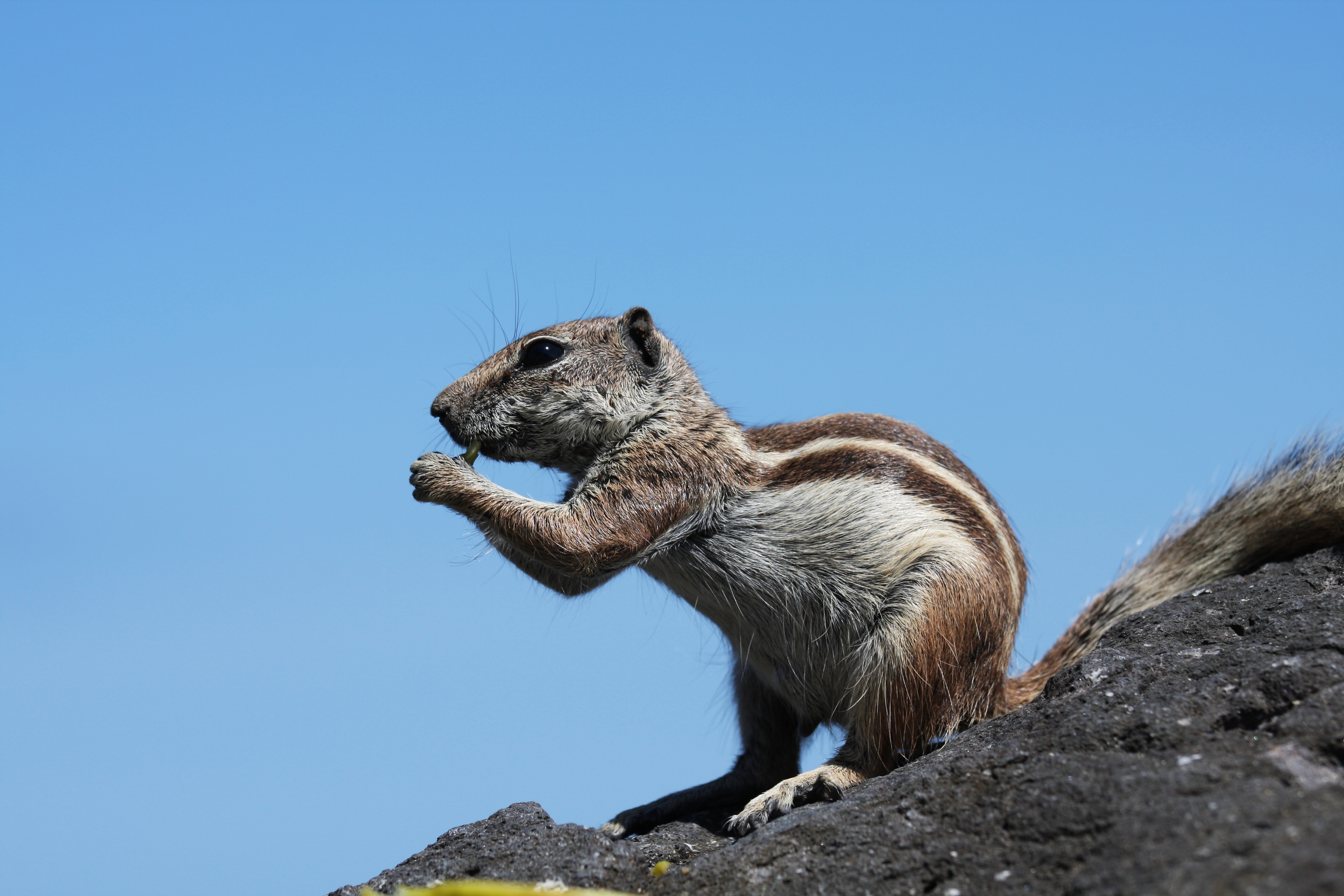
Barbary ground squirrel

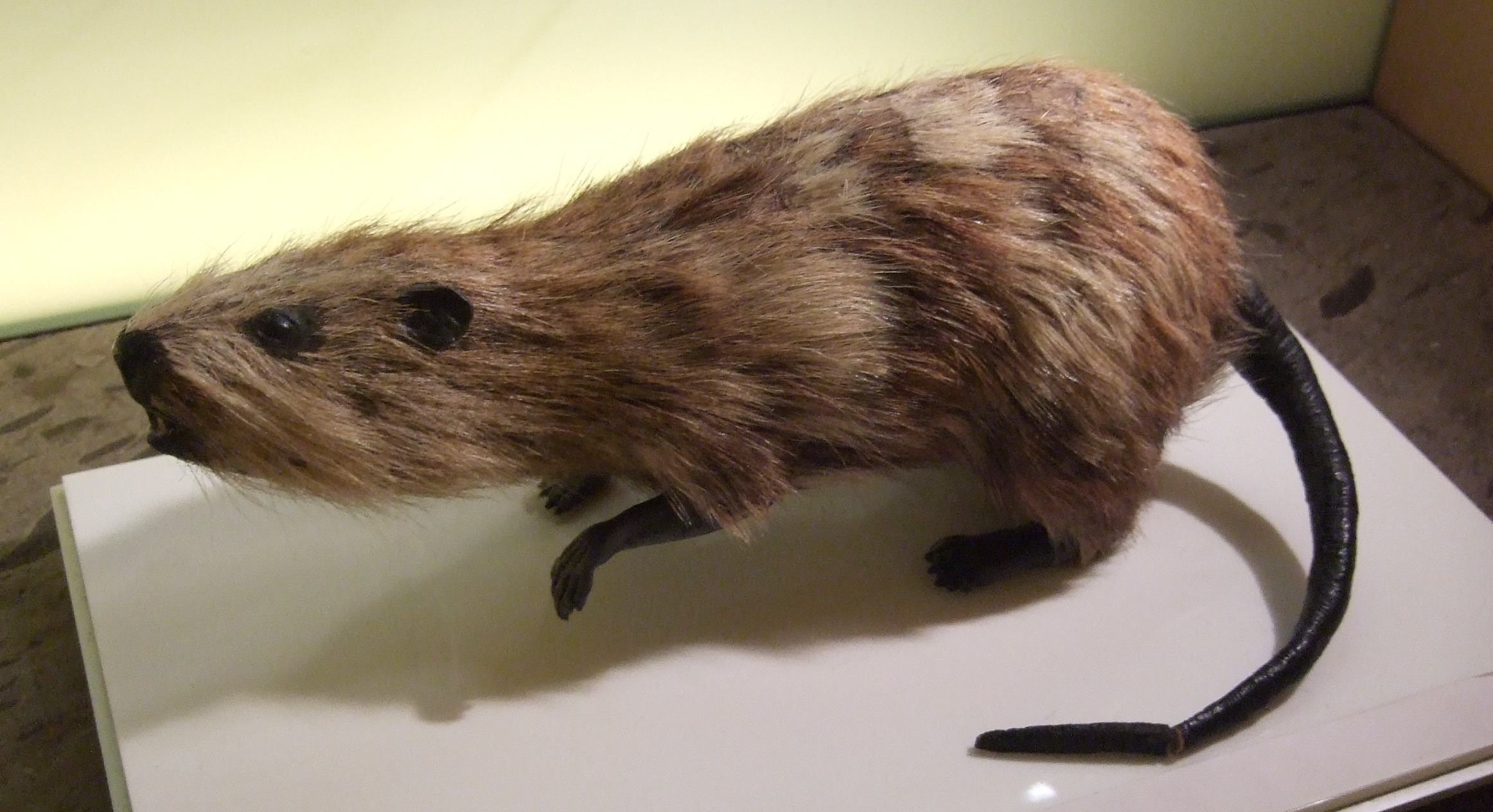
Restoration of a Tenerife giant rat

Rodents make up the largest order of mammals, with over 40% of mammalian species. They have two incisors in the upper and lower jaw which grow continually and must be kept short by gnawing. Most rodents are small though the capybara can weigh up to 45 kg (99 lb).

- Suborder: Sciuromorpha
  - Family: Sciuridae (squirrels)
    - Subfamily: Xerinae
      - Genus: Atlantoxerus
        - Barbary ground squirrel, A. getulus LC introduced
- Suborder: Myomorpha
  - Family: Muridae (mice and rats)
      - Genus: Canariomys
        - Tenerife giant rat, C. bravoi EX
        - Gran Canaria giant rat, C. tamarani EX
      - Genus: Malpaisomys
        - Lava mouse, M. insularis EX
    - Subfamily: Murinae
      - Genus: Mus
        - House mouse, M. musculus LC introduced
      - Genus: Rattus
        - Black rat, R. rattus LC introduced
        - Brown rat, R. norvegicus LC introduced

==== Order: Lagomorphs (lagomorphs) ====
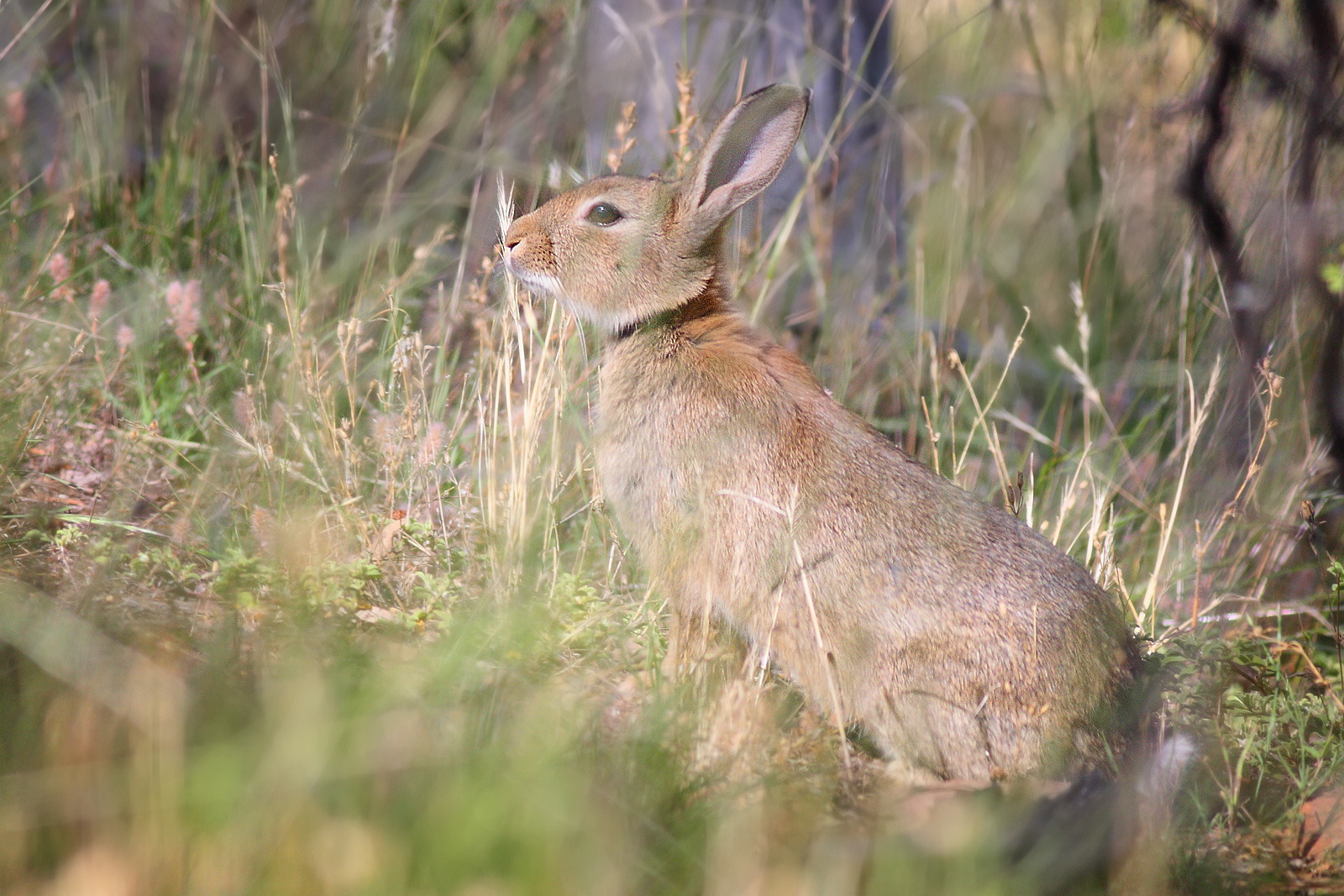
European rabbit

The lagomorphs comprise two families, Leporidae (hares and rabbits), and Ochotonidae (pikas). Though they can resemble rodents, and were classified as a superfamily in that order until the early 20th century, they have since been considered a separate order. They differ from rodents in a number of physical characteristics, such as having four incisors in the upper jaw rather than two.

- Family: Leporidae (rabbits, hares)
  - Genus: Oryctolagus
    - European rabbit, O. cuniculus LC introduced

==== Order: Erinaceomorpha (hedgehogs and gymnures) ====
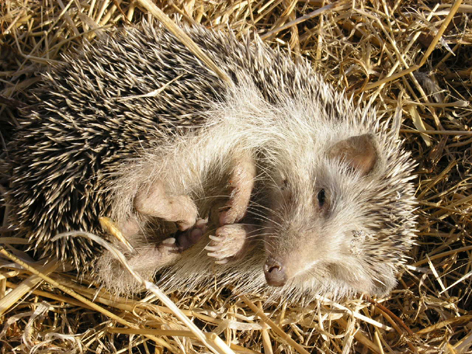
North African hedgehog

The order Erinaceomorpha contains a single family, Erinaceidae, which comprise the hedgehogs and gymnures. The hedgehogs are easily recognised by their spines while gymnures look more like large rats.

- Family: Erinaceidae (hedgehogs)
  - Subfamily: Erinaceinae
    - Genus: Atelerix
      - North African hedgehog, A. algirus LC introduced

==== Order: Soricomorpha (shrews, moles, and solenodons) ====
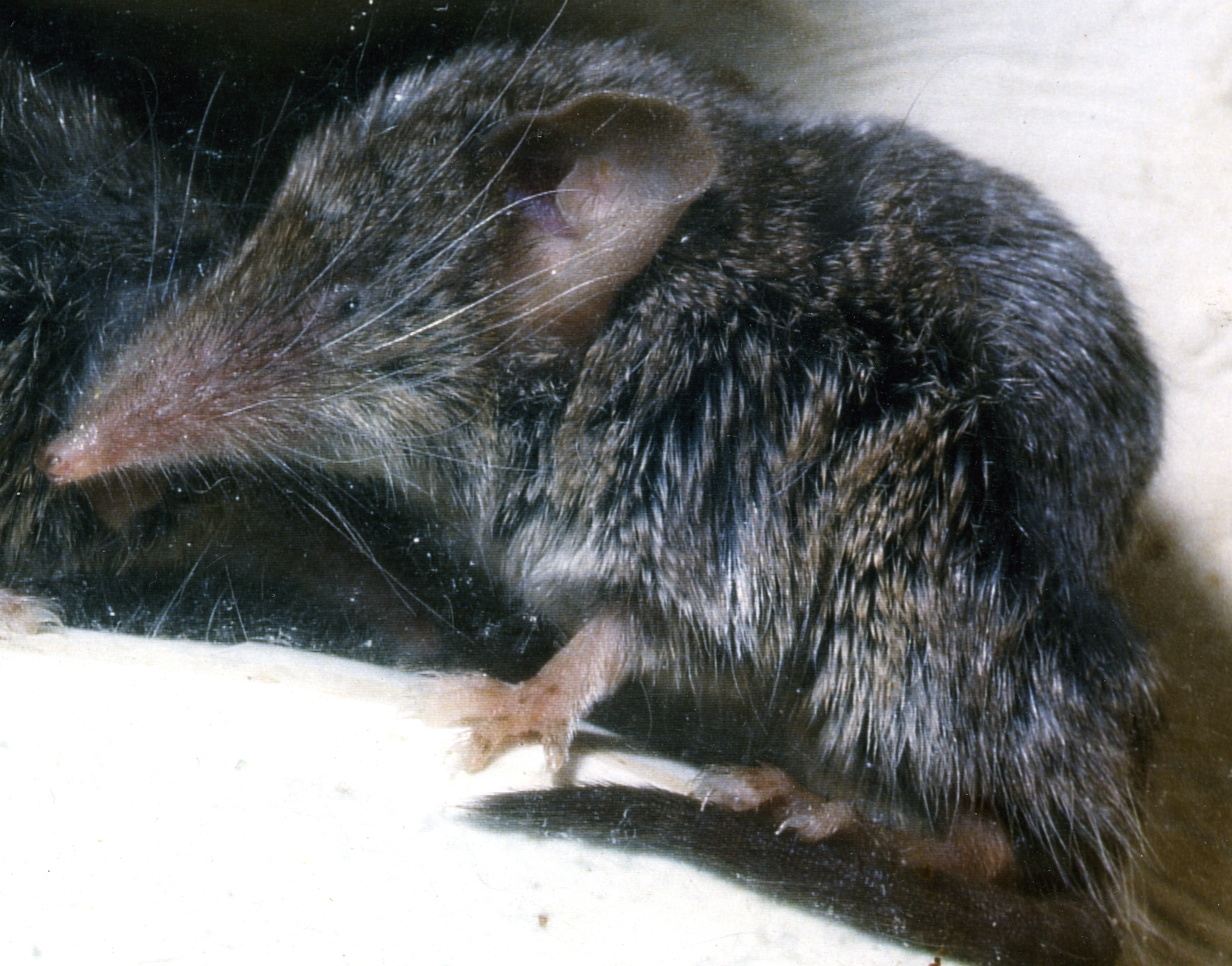
Canarian shrew

The "shrew-forms" are insectivorous mammals. The shrews and solenodons closely resemble mice while the moles are stout bodied burrowers.

- Family: Soricidae (shrews)
  - Subfamily: Crocidurinae
    - Genus: Crocidura
      - Canarian shrew, Crocidura canariensis EN
      - Greater white-toothed shrew, Crocidura russula NA introduced
    - Genus: Suncus
      - Etruscan shrew, Suncus etruscus NA introduced

==== Order: Chiroptera (bats) ====
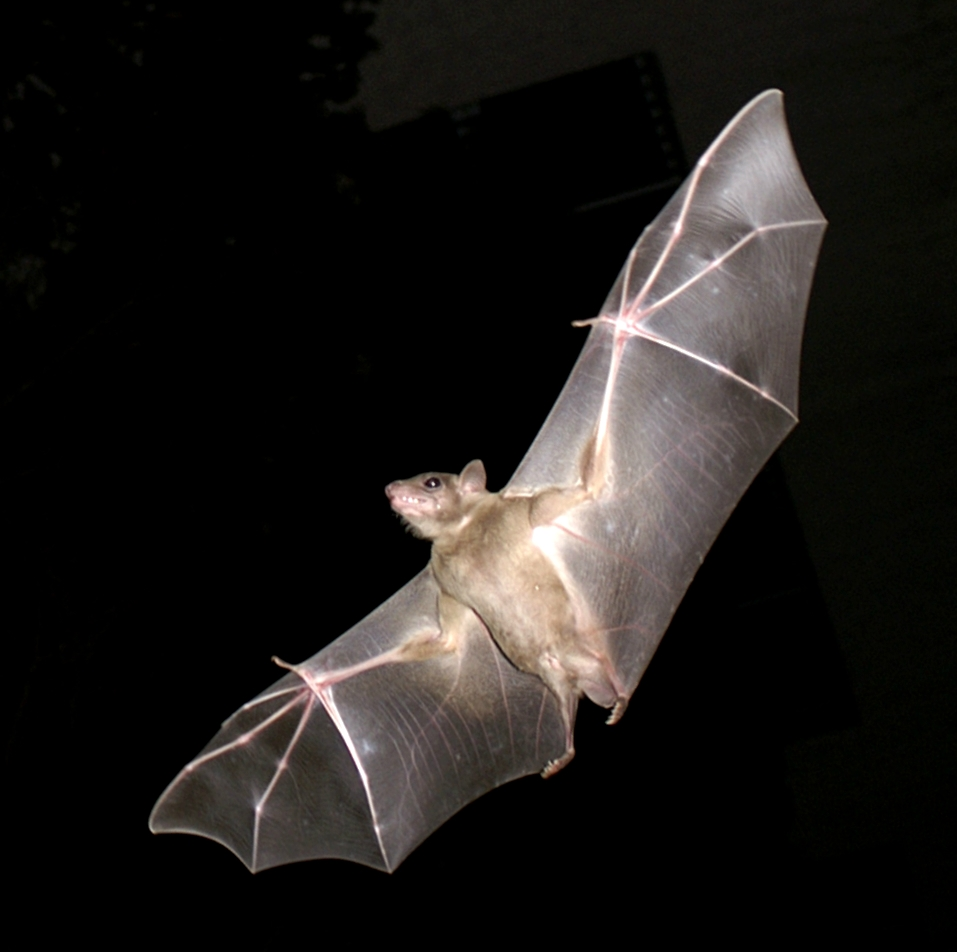
Egyptian fruit bat, accidentally introduced in Tenerife

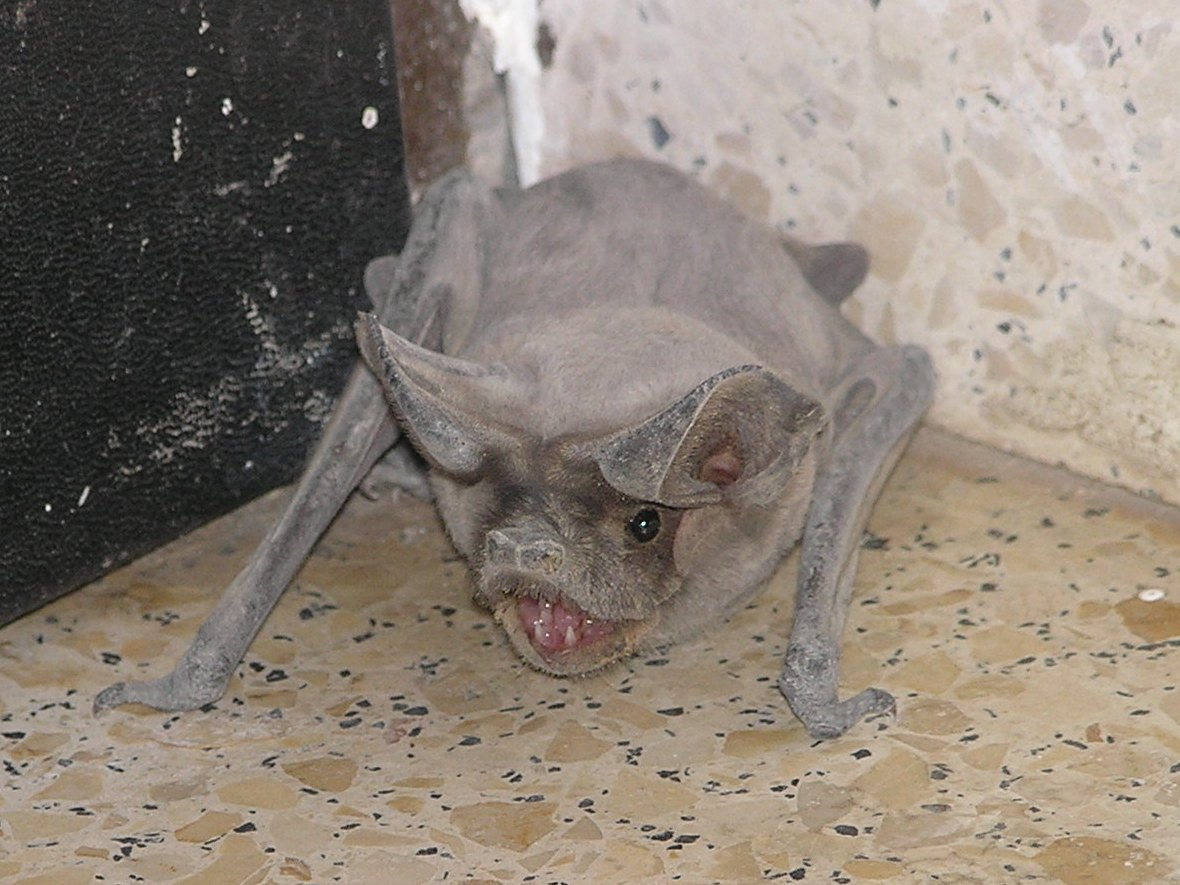
European free-tailed bat

The bats' most distinguishing feature is that their forelimbs are developed as wings, making them the only mammals capable of flight. Bat species account for about 20% of all mammals.

- Suborder: Megachiroptera
  - Family: Pteropodidae (flying foxes, Old World fruit bats)
    - Genus: Rousettus
      - Egyptian fruit bat, Rousettus aegyptiacus LC introduced
- Suborder: Microchiroptera
  - Family: Molossidae (free-tailed bats)
    - Subfamily: Molossinae
      - Genus: Tadarida
        - European free-tailed bat, Tadarida teniotis LC
  - Family: Vespertilionidae (vesper bats)
    - Subfamily: Vespertilioninae
      - Genus: Barbastella
        - Barbastelle, Barbastella barbastellus NT
      - Genus: Hypsugo
        - Savi's pipistrelle, Hypsugo savii LC
      - Genus: Nyctalus
        - Lesser noctule, Nyctalus leisleri LC
      - Genus: Pipistrellus
        - Kuhl's pipistrelle, Pipistrellus kuhlii LC
        - Madeira pipistrelle, Pipistrellus maderensis VU
      - Genus: Plecotus
        - Canary big-eared bat, Plecotus teneriffae VU

==== Order: Cetacea (whales) ====
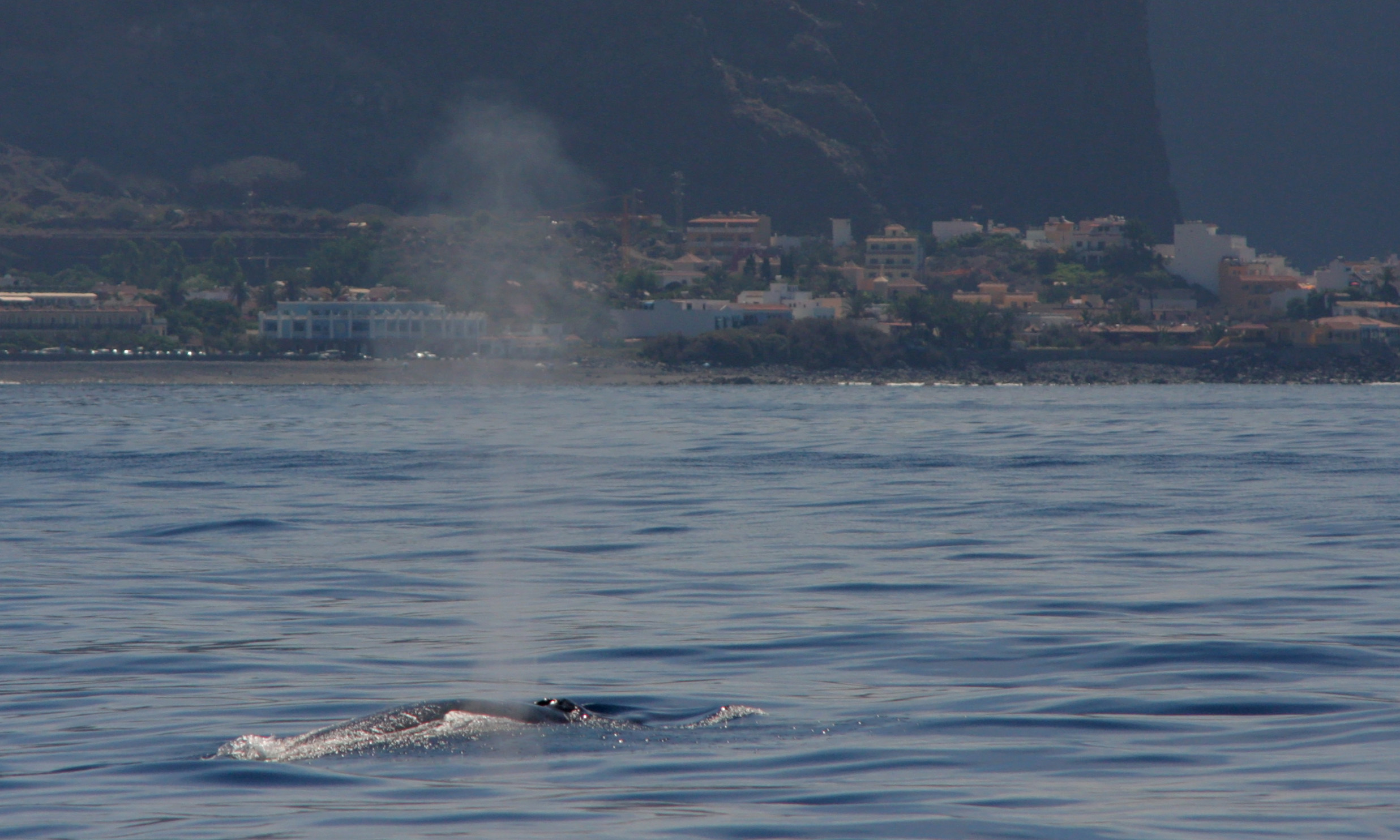
Bryde's whale off La Gomera

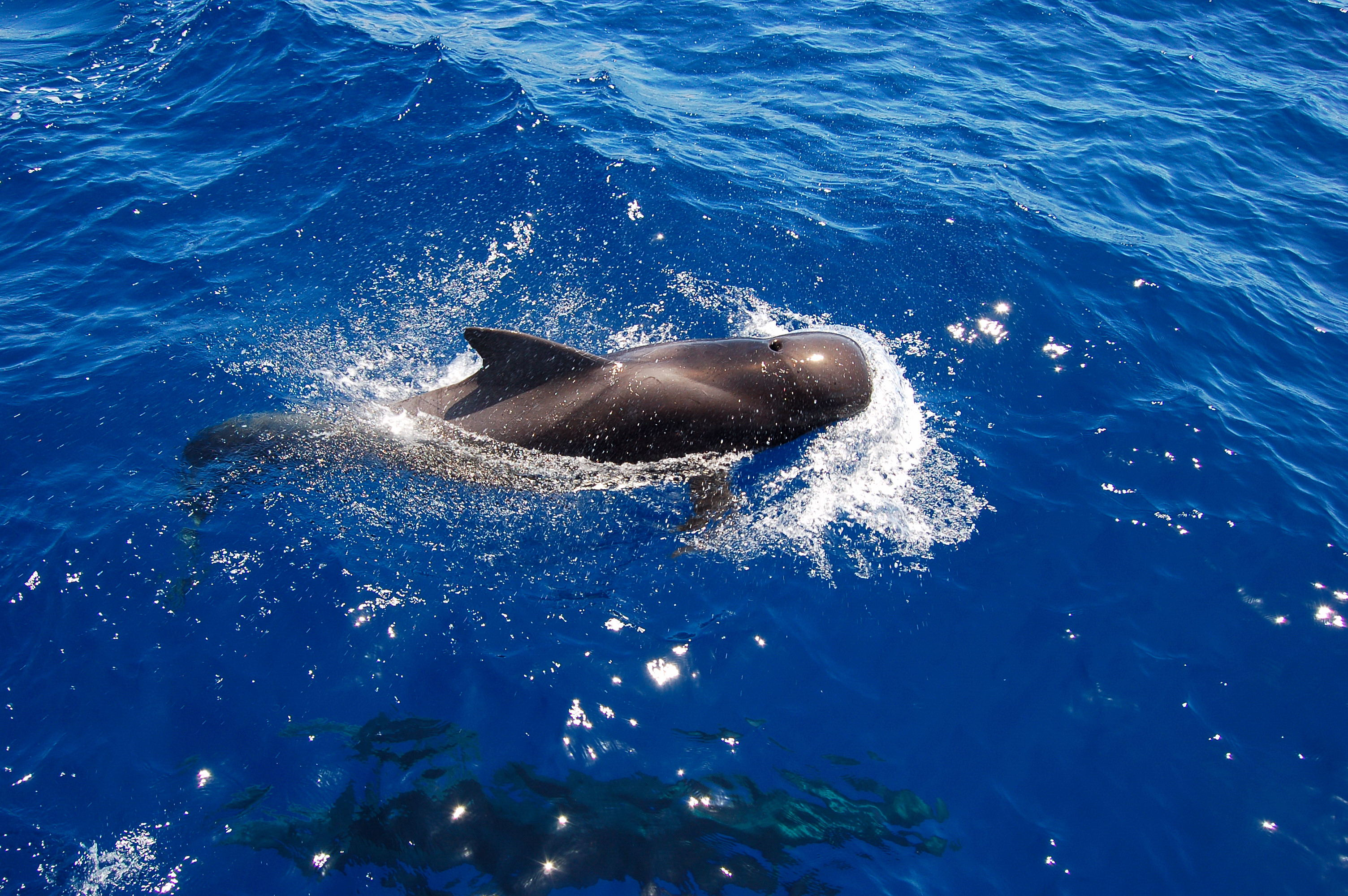
Short-finned pilot whales off Tenerife are one of the main attractions in the Canary Islands

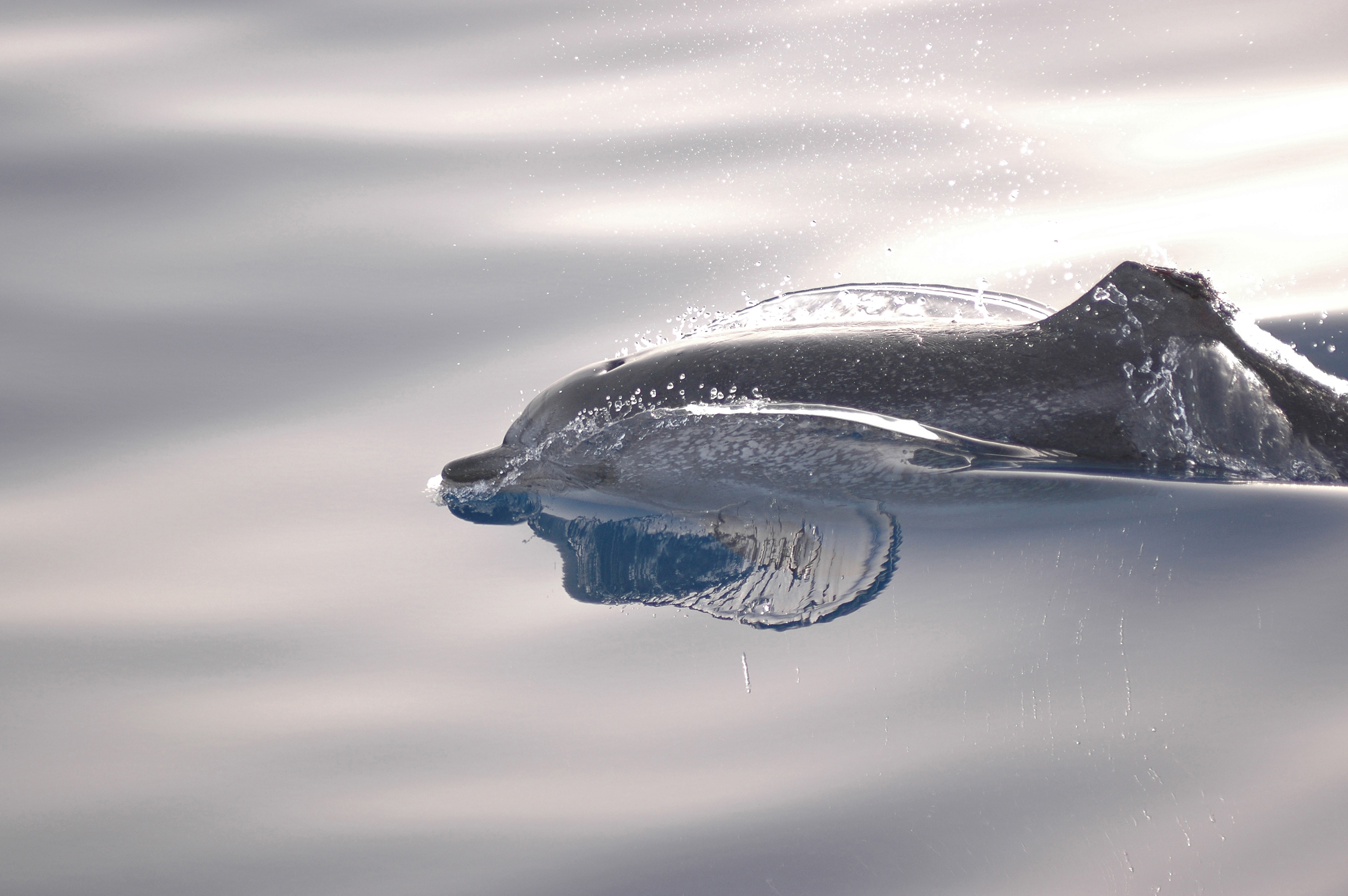
Atlantic spotted dolphin with an injured dorsal fin off La Gomera

The order Cetacea includes whales, dolphins and porpoises. They are the mammals most fully adapted to aquatic life with a spindle-shaped nearly hairless body, protected by a thick layer of blubber, and forelimbs and tail modified to provide propulsion underwater.

- Suborder: Mysticeti
  - Family: Balaenopteridae (rorquals)
    - Genus: Balaenoptera
      - Common minke whale, Balaenoptera acutorostrata LC
      - Bryde's whale, Balaenoptera edeni DD
      - Blue whale, Balaenoptera musculus EN
      - Fin whale, Balaenoptera physalus EN vagrant
    - Genus: Megaptera
      - Humpback whale, Megaptera novaeangliae LC
  - Family: Balaenidae
    - Genus: Eubalaena
      - North Atlantic right whale, Eubalaena glacialis CR
- Suborder: Odontoceti
  - Family: Delphinidae (dolphins and pilot whales)
    - Genus: Delphinus
      - Short-beaked common dolphin, Delphinus delphis LC
    - Genus: Globicephala
      - Short-finned pilot whale, Globicephala macrorhynchus LC
      - Long-finned pilot whale, Globicephala melas LC
    - Genus: Grampus
      - Risso's dolphin, Grampus griseus LC
    - Genus: Lagenodelphis
      - Fraser's dolphin, Lagenodelphis hosei LC
    - Genus: Orcinus
      - Orca, Orcinus orca DD
    - Genus: Pseudorca
      - False killer whale, Pseudorca crassidens NT
    - Genus: Stenella
      - Striped dolphin, Stenella coeruleoalba LC
      - Atlantic spotted dolphin, Stenella frontalis LC
    - Genus: Steno
      - Rough-toothed dolphin, Steno bredanensis LC
    - Genus: Tursiops
      - Common bottlenose dolphin, Tursiops truncatus LC
  - Family: Kogiidae (small sperm whales)
    - Genus: Kogia
      - Pygmy sperm whale, Kogia breviceps DD
      - Dwarf sperm whale, Kogia sima DD
  - Family: Physeteridae (sperm whales)
    - Genus: Physeter
      - Sperm whale, Physeter macrocephalus VU
  - Family: Ziphiidae (beaked whales)
    - Genus: Hyperoodon
      - Northern bottlenose whale, Hyperoodon ampullatus DD
    - Genus: Mesoplodon
      - Blainville's beaked whale, Mesoplodon densirostris DD
      - Gervais' beaked whale, Mesoplodon europaeus DD
      - True's beaked whale, Mesoplodon mirus DD
    - Genus: Ziphius
      - Cuvier's beaked whale, Ziphius cavirostris LC

==== Order: Artiodactyla (even-toed ungulates) ====
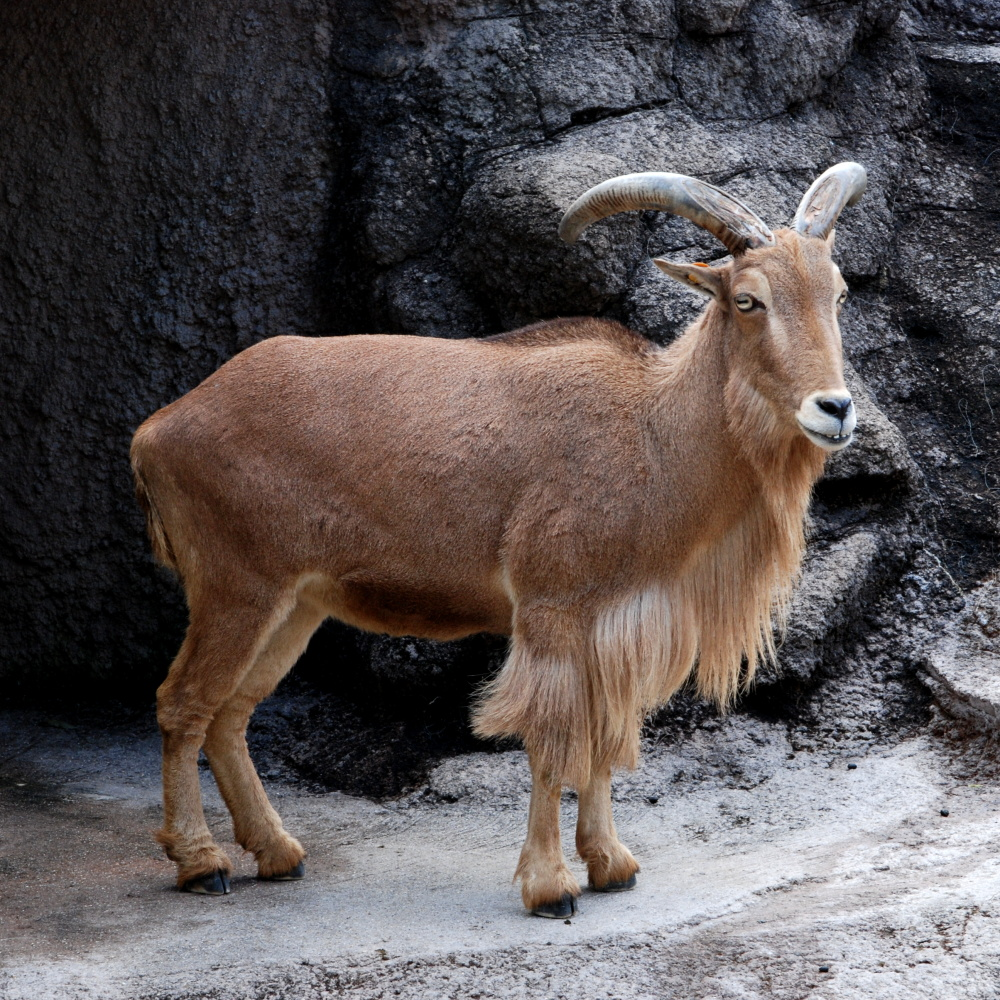
Barbary sheep

The even-toed ungulates are ungulates whose weight is borne about equally by the third and fourth toes, rather than mostly or entirely by the third as in perissodactyls. There are about 220 artiodactyl species, including many that are of great economic importance to humans.

- Family: Bovidae (cattle, antelope, sheep, goats)
  - Subfamily: Caprinae
    - Genus: Ammotragus
      - Barbary sheep, Ammotragus lervia VU introduced
    - Genus: Ovis
      - European mouflon, Ovis aries introduced

== Locally extinct ==
The following species are locally extinct in the area but continue to exist elsewhere:

- Mediterranean monk seal, Monachus monachus

== See also ==
- List of chordate orders
- Lists of mammals by region
- List of prehistoric mammals
- Mammal classification
- List of mammals described in the 2000s
- List of birds of the Canary Islands
- List of reptiles of the Canary Islands
- List of amphibians of the Canary Islands
