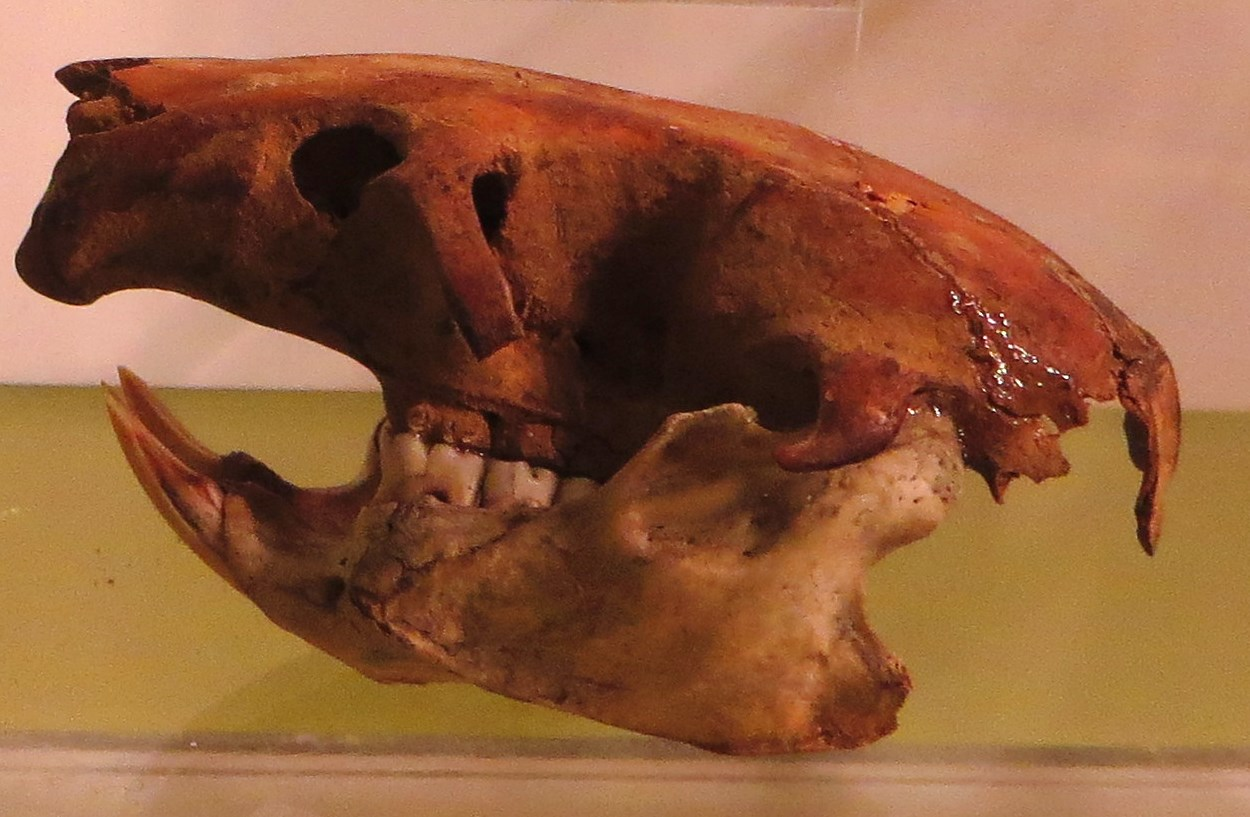
- Skull housed in Museo de la Naturaleza y el Hombre in Santa Cruz de Tenerife.

Scientific classification
- Kingdom: Animalia
- Phylum: Chordata
- Class: Mammalia
- Order: Rodentia
- Family: Muridae
- Genus: †Canariomys
- Species: †C. bravoi

Binomial name
- †Canariomys bravoi Crusafont Pairó & Petter, 1964

= Tenerife giant rat =

Tenerife giant rat Temporal range: Late Pleistocene

Extinct species of rodent

The Tenerife giant rat (Canariomys bravoi) is an extinct species of rodent endemic to the island of Tenerife, the largest of the Canary Islands, Spain. Many remains have been found during archeological digs. Most remains are from the Pleistocene. Radiocarbon dating has placed some of the finds in the late Pleistocene.

== Discovery ==
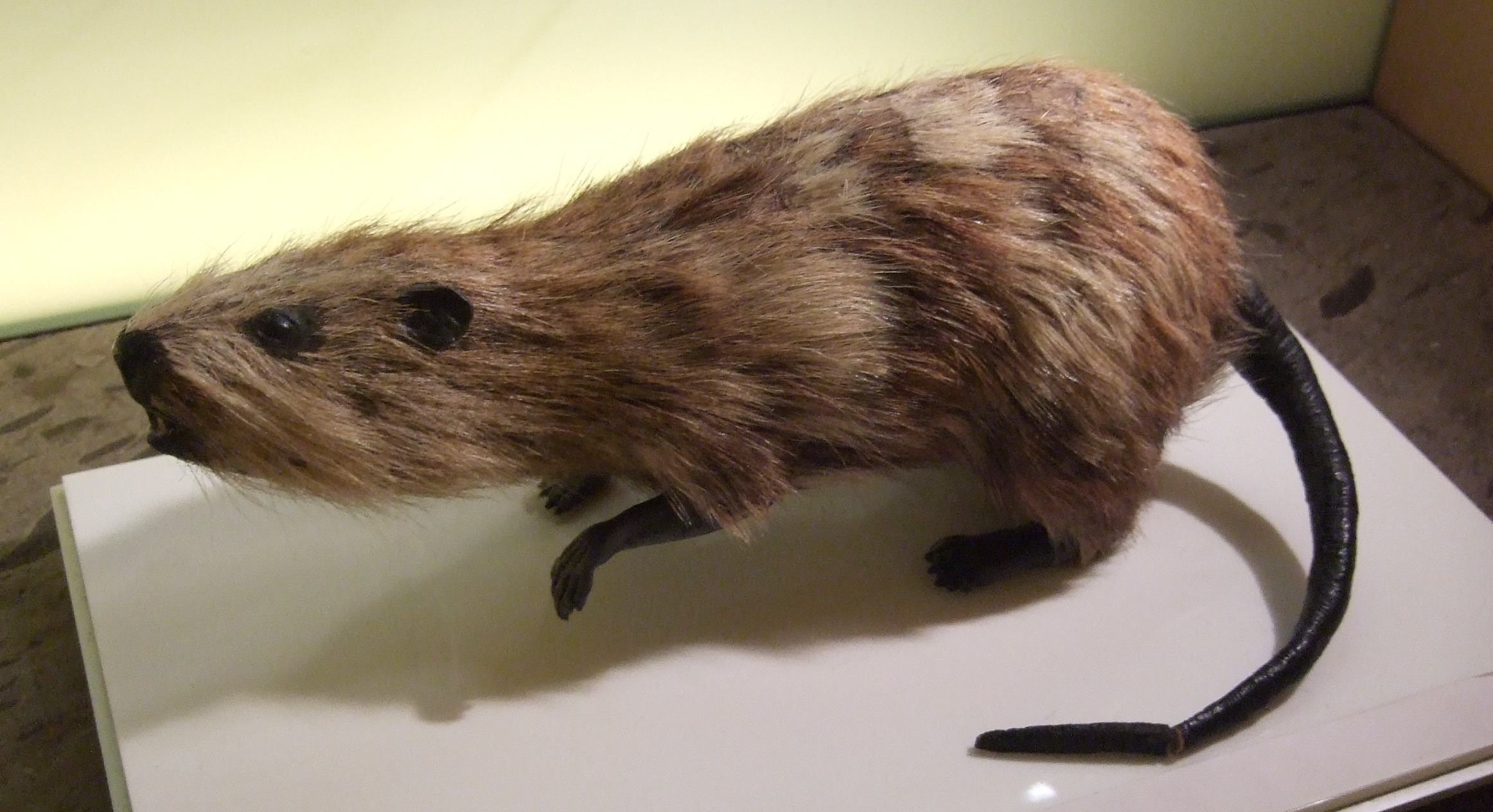
Restoration in Museo de la Naturaleza y el Hombre, Santa Cruz de Tenerife.

Fossilized remains of this animal have been found practically in every part of the island, but especially in deposits in caves or volcanic pipes of the island, where it often appears together with remains of other species such as the giant lizards (Gallotia goliath). In particular, its bony remains have been discovered in large amounts in the deposit of Buenavista del Norte (in the northwest of Tenerife).

Their fossils date back to the Pleistocene epoch. The first fossils were found by the naturalist Telesforo Bravo, from whom the name of the rodent is derived. Biologists Crusafont-Pairó and Petter first described the giant rat in 1964.

The giant rat, along with some other endemic species of the islands, became extinct due to the activities of the initial human colonists, the Guanches, who arrived around 1000 BC, including their introduction of feral cats.

Today, the Museo de la Naturaleza y el Hombre in Santa Cruz de Tenerife exhibits fossil skulls and bones of this animal, as well as faithful reconstructions. Another giant rat of the Canary Islands was Canariomys tamarani.

== Description ==
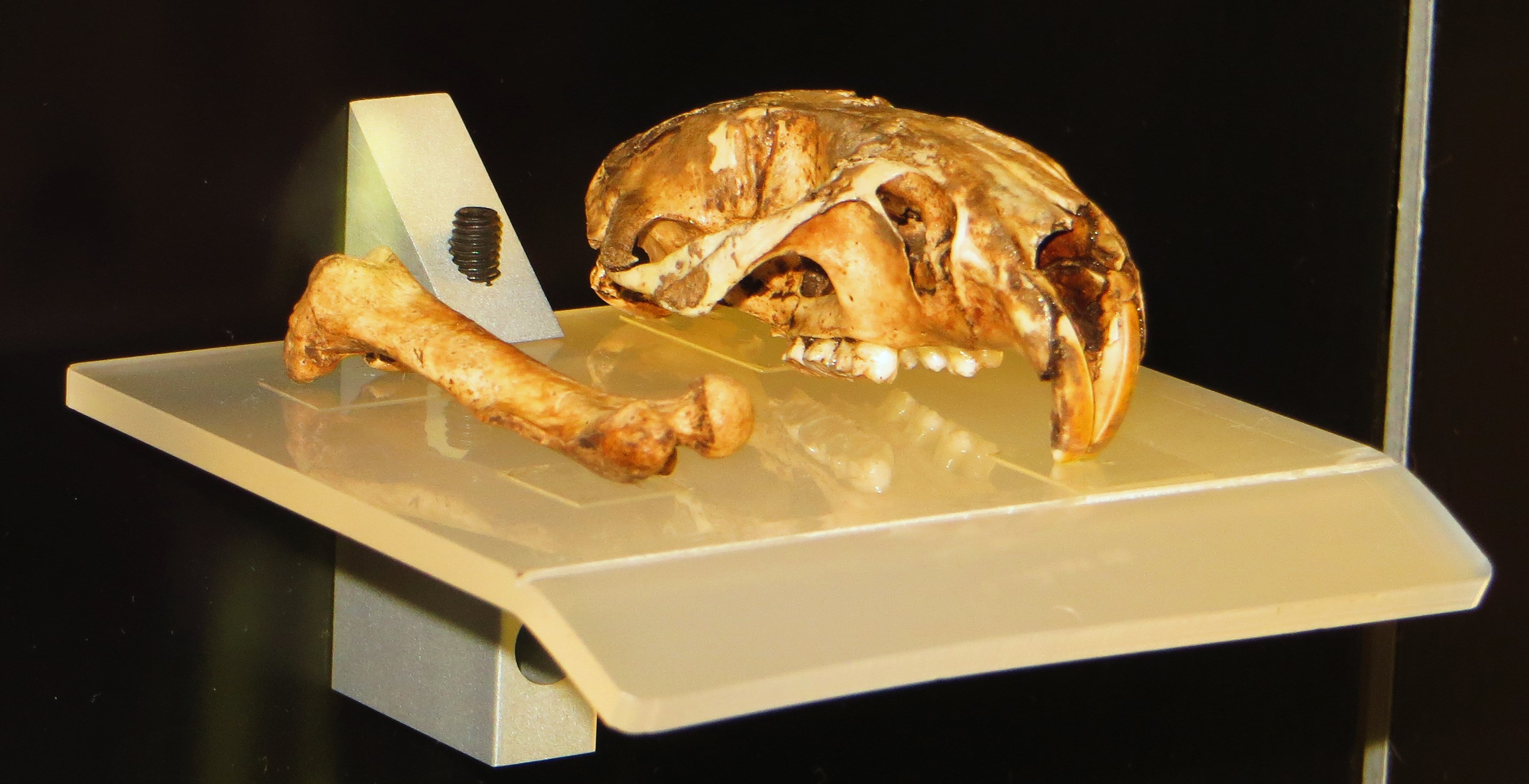
Fossils in Museo de la Naturaleza y el Hombre.

This species was a big rat of about 1 kg (2.2 lb) or more. It had a cranium that reached up to seven centimetres in length. Including the tail, the rat was over 1.14 m (3 ft 9 in), making it the largest of its family (at least in the Canaries).

A scientific study published in 2012 compared the Canariomys bravoi species to present-day arboreal rodents such as Phloeomys cumingi, the giant rat of the island of Luzon in the Philippines. The study revealed that among the distinctive features of C. bravoi are claws that develop almost similarly in the anterior and posterior limbs. Also the hind legs longer than the front ones evoke an intermediate form between rats and arboreal murids like Phloeomys. Canariomys bravoi was a strong and powerfully muscled rodent able to move on different substrates from the ground to the trees, and probably had digging skills.

== Palaeoecology ==
Paired δ^{13}C and δ^{15}N analysis shows that the Tenerife giant rat was omnivorous and relied predominantly on energy derived from C_{3} plants. Elevated δ^{13}C values in the inland Icod municipality suggest that it foraged in forest canopies in this region. Additionally, in regions where the Tenerife giant rat coexisted with the Tenerife giant lizard, the δ^{13}C and δ^{15}N of both species differ slightly, indicating niche partitioning between the two of them. The dental microwear of the Tenerife giant rat indicates that it was a highly generalist herbivore that consumed a variety of plants, the one exception being grass.

Genetic evidence indicates that the genus is nested within Arvicanthis, specifically within the African grass rat (A. niloticus) species complex, with an estimated divergence from its mainland relatives around 650,000 years ago.

== See also ==
- List of African animals extinct in the Holocene
- List of extinct animals of Europe
- Island gigantism
