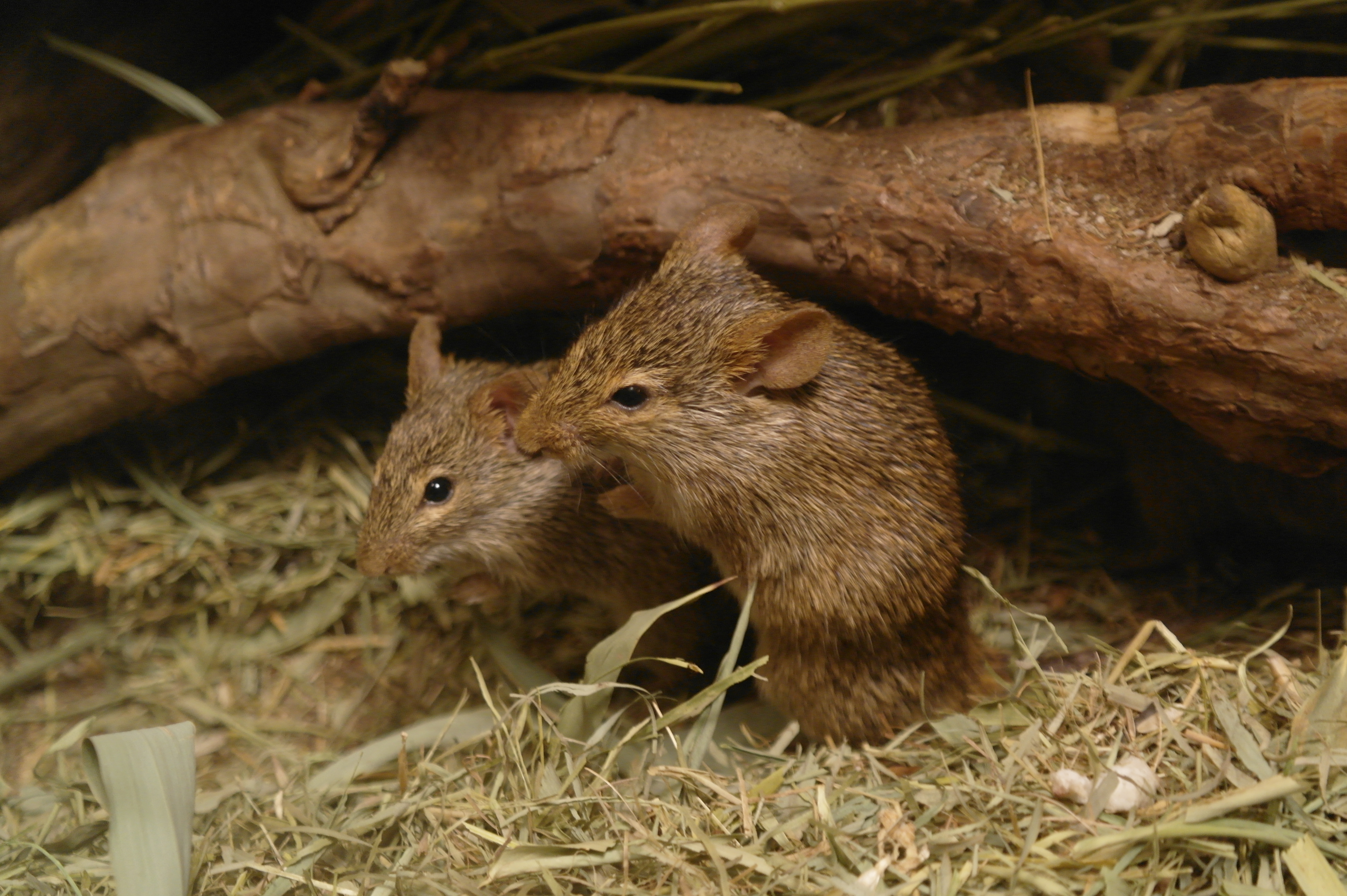
- Neumann's grass rats in the Prague Zoo

Conservation status
- Least Concern (IUCN 3.1)

Scientific classification
- Kingdom: Animalia
- Phylum: Chordata
- Class: Mammalia
- Order: Rodentia
- Family: Muridae
- Genus: Arvicanthis
- Species: A. neumanni

Binomial name
- Arvicanthis neumanni (Matschie, 1894)

Synonyms
- Arvicanthis somalicus Thomas, 1903

= Neumann's grass rat =

Species of rodent

Neumann's grass rat (Arvicanthis neumanni) is a species of rodent in the family Muridae. It is found in Ethiopia, Somalia, Sudan, Tanzania, and possibly Kenya. Its natural habitats are dry savanna and subtropical or tropical dry shrubland.
