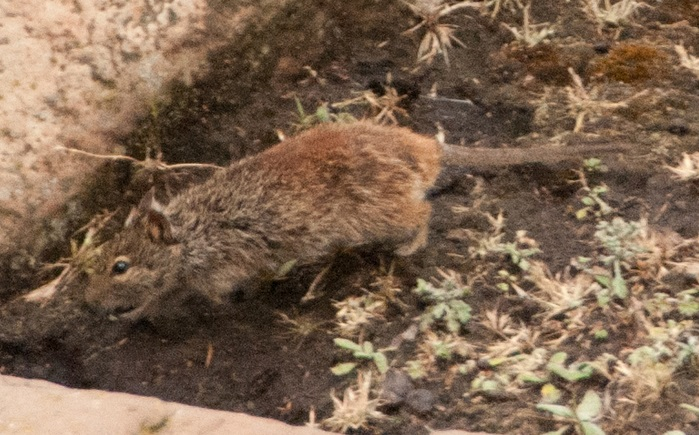

Conservation status
- Least Concern (IUCN 3.1)

Scientific classification
- Kingdom: Animalia
- Phylum: Chordata
- Class: Mammalia
- Order: Rodentia
- Family: Muridae
- Genus: Arvicanthis
- Species: A. abyssinicus

Binomial name
- Arvicanthis abyssinicus (Rüppell, 1842)

= Abyssinian grass rat =

Species of rodent

The Abyssinian grass rat (Arvicanthis abyssinicus) is a species of rodent in the family Muridae. It is found in Ethiopia. Its natural habitats are subtropical or tropical high-altitude grassland, arable land, and pastureland.
