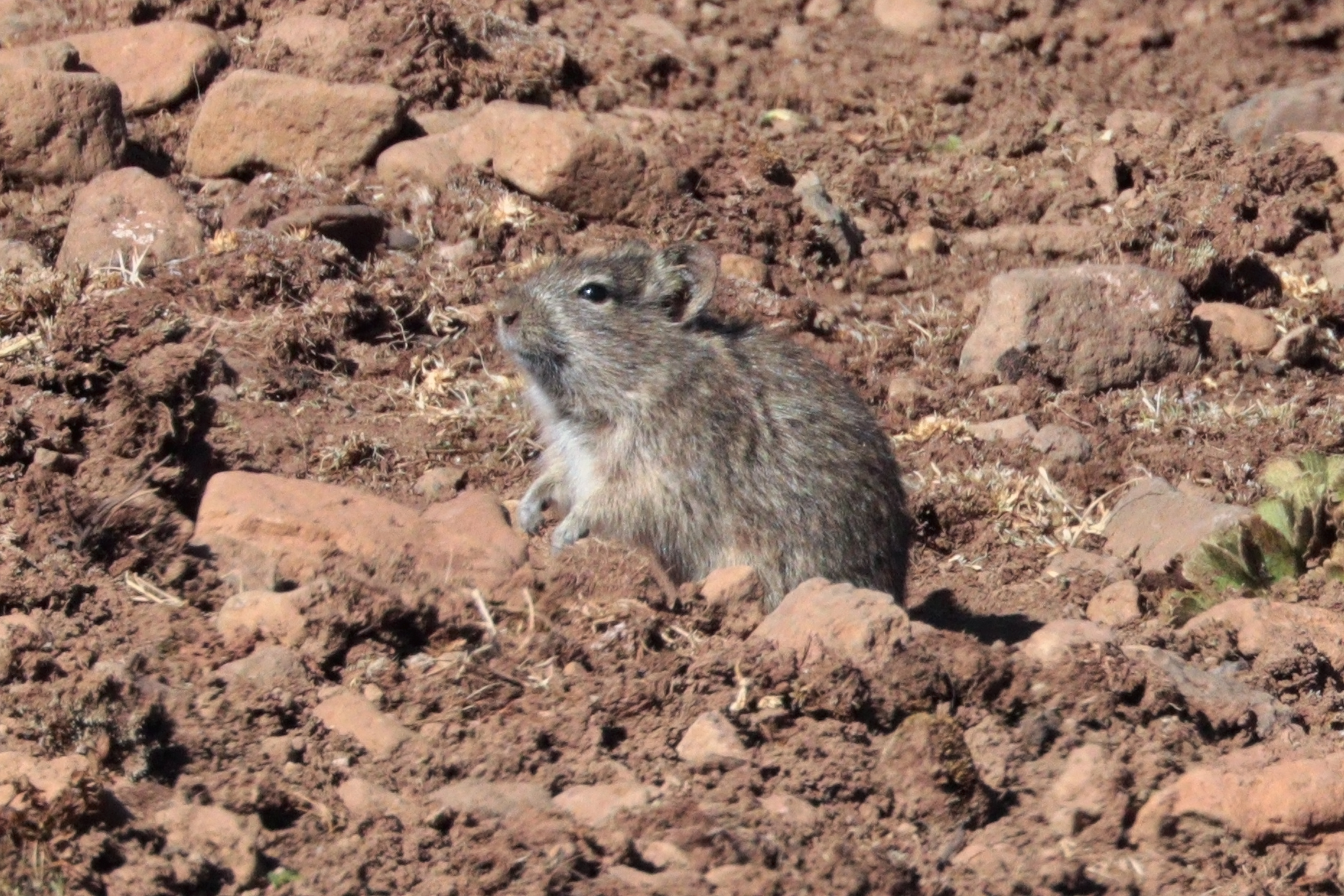
- Sanetti Plateau, Bale Mountains, Ethiopia

Conservation status
- Near Threatened (IUCN 3.1)

Scientific classification
- Domain: Eukaryota
- Kingdom: Animalia
- Phylum: Chordata
- Class: Mammalia
- Order: Rodentia
- Family: Muridae
- Genus: Arvicanthis
- Species: A. blicki

Binomial name
- Arvicanthis blicki Frick, 1914

= Blick's grass rat =

Species of rodent

Blick's grass rat (Arvicanthis blicki) is a species of rodent in the family Muridae. It is found only in Ethiopia. Its natural habitat is subtropical or tropical high-altitude grassland. It is threatened by habitat loss.
