= Guinean grass rat =

Conservation status
- Least Concern (IUCN 3.1)

Scientific classification
- Kingdom: Animalia
- Phylum: Chordata
- Class: Mammalia
- Order: Rodentia
- Family: Muridae
- Genus: Arvicanthis
- Species: A. rufinus

Binomial name
- Arvicanthis rufinus (Temminck, 1853)

Species of rodent

The Guinean grass rat (Arvicanthis rufinus) is a species of rodent in the family Muridae. It is found in Benin, Ghana, Togo, possibly Cameroon, possibly Central African Republic, possibly Ivory Coast, possibly Guinea, possibly Liberia, and possibly Sierra Leone. Its natural habitats are moist savanna, subtropical or tropical dry shrubland, subtropical or tropical moist shrubland, arable land, pastureland, and urban areas.
