= Sudanian grass rat =

Conservation status
- Least Concern (IUCN 3.1)

Scientific classification
- Kingdom: Animalia
- Phylum: Chordata
- Class: Mammalia
- Order: Rodentia
- Family: Muridae
- Genus: Arvicanthis
- Species: A. ansorgei

Binomial name
- Arvicanthis ansorgei Thomas, 1910

Species of rodent

The Sudanian grass rat (Arvicanthis ansorgei) is a species of rodent in the family Muridae. It is found in Burkina Faso, Guinea-Bissau, Mali, Niger, Senegal, possibly Benin, possibly Ivory Coast, possibly Ghana, possibly Guinea, and possibly Togo. Its natural habitats are subtropical or tropical dry shrubland, subtropical or tropical moist shrubland, subtropical or tropical dry lowland grassland, subtropical or tropical seasonally wet or flooded lowland grassland, arable land, pastureland, rural gardens, irrigated land, seasonally flooded agricultural land, and canals and ditches.
