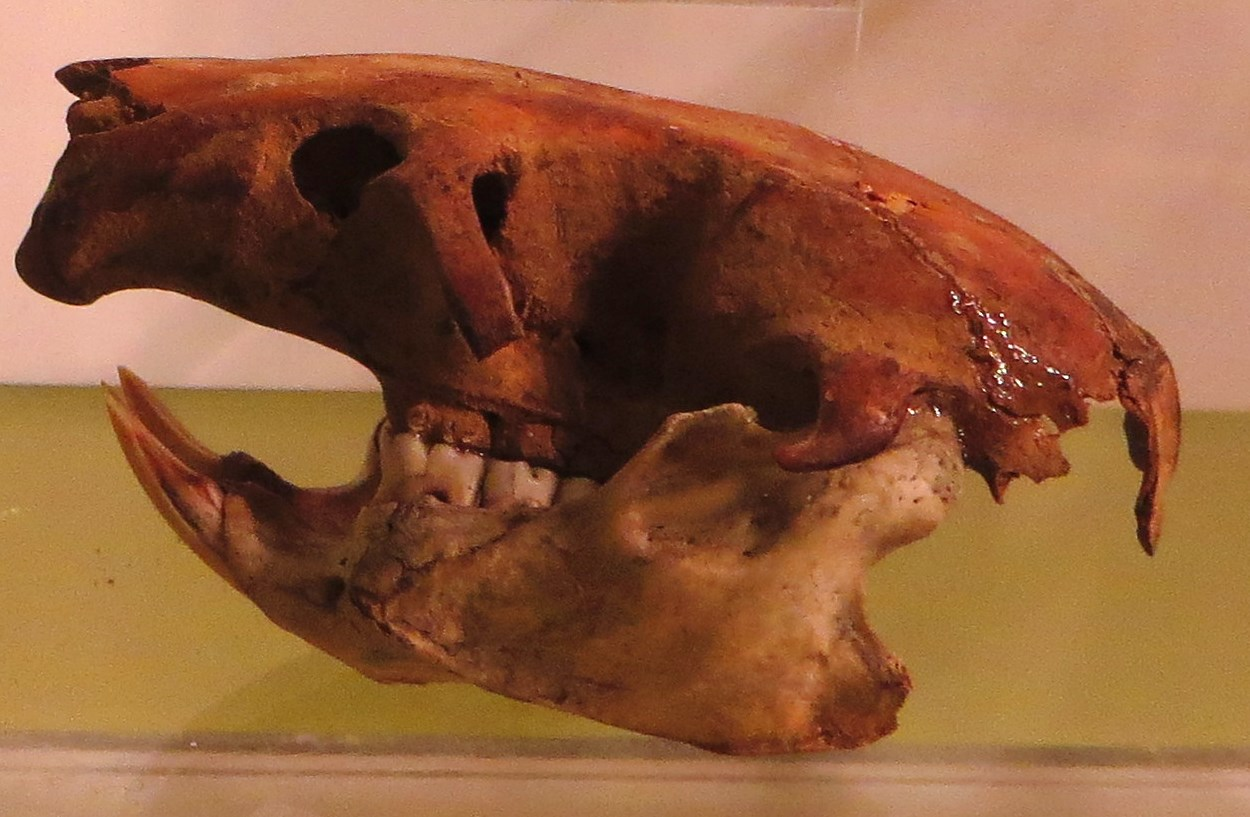
- Skull of Tenerife giant rat at Museo de la Naturaleza y el Hombre

Scientific classification
- Kingdom: Animalia
- Phylum: Chordata
- Class: Mammalia
- Order: Rodentia
- Family: Muridae
- Tribe: Arvicanthini
- Genus: †Canariomys; Crusafont-Pairó & Petter, 1964 / Lopez-Martinez & López-Jurado, L. F. (1987)

Species
- Canariomys bravoi; Canariomys tamarani

= Canariomys =

Canariomys Temporal range: Pleistocene to Holocene

Extinct genus of rodents

Canariomys is an extinct genus of rodents (Old World rats and mice) that once existed on the islands of Tenerife and Gran Canaria, part of the Canary Islands, Spain. These giant rats could reach a weight of about 1 kg (2.2 lb). They were herbivores; their diet was based on plant materials, probably soft vegetables such as roots, ferns, and berries, but not grass. C. tamarani were considered herbivores, eating everything plant-like except grass with good digging skills. While C. bravoi were considered as a rat character, because of its large size, with an omnivorous diet with good climbing skills. They were one of two groups of rodents native to the archipelago, alongside the lava mouse (Malpaisomys insularis), which was native to Fuerteventura and Lanzarote.

== Original distribution ==
It is generally believed that the species of Tenerife lived in a wooded area linked to the laurisilva and that it had climbing abilities, whereas the species of Gran Canaria lived in more open environments and was more linked to the excavation of burrows. Both species lived without strong predation pressure, until became extinct around the beginning of the 1st Millennium, shortly after the first human settlement of the islands by the Guanches.

== Phylogeny ==
Two species are currently recognized, the Tenerife giant rat, (Canariomys bravoi), and the Gran Canaria giant rat (Canariomys tamarani). Both species lived in between the Pleistocene and Holocene epochs.

Genetic evidence indicates that the genus is nested within Arvicanthis, specifically within the African grass rat (A. niloticus) species complex, with an estimated divergence from its mainland relatives around 650,000 years ago.
