= Nairobi grass rat =

Conservation status
- Least Concern (IUCN 3.1)

Scientific classification
- Kingdom: Animalia
- Phylum: Chordata
- Class: Mammalia
- Order: Rodentia
- Family: Muridae
- Genus: Arvicanthis
- Species: A. nairobae

Binomial name
- Arvicanthis nairobae J.A. Allen, 1909

Species of rodent

The Nairobi grass rat (Arvicanthis nairobae) is a species of rodent in the family Muridae. It is found in Kenya, Tanzania, and possibly Ethiopia. Its natural habitat is dry savanna.
