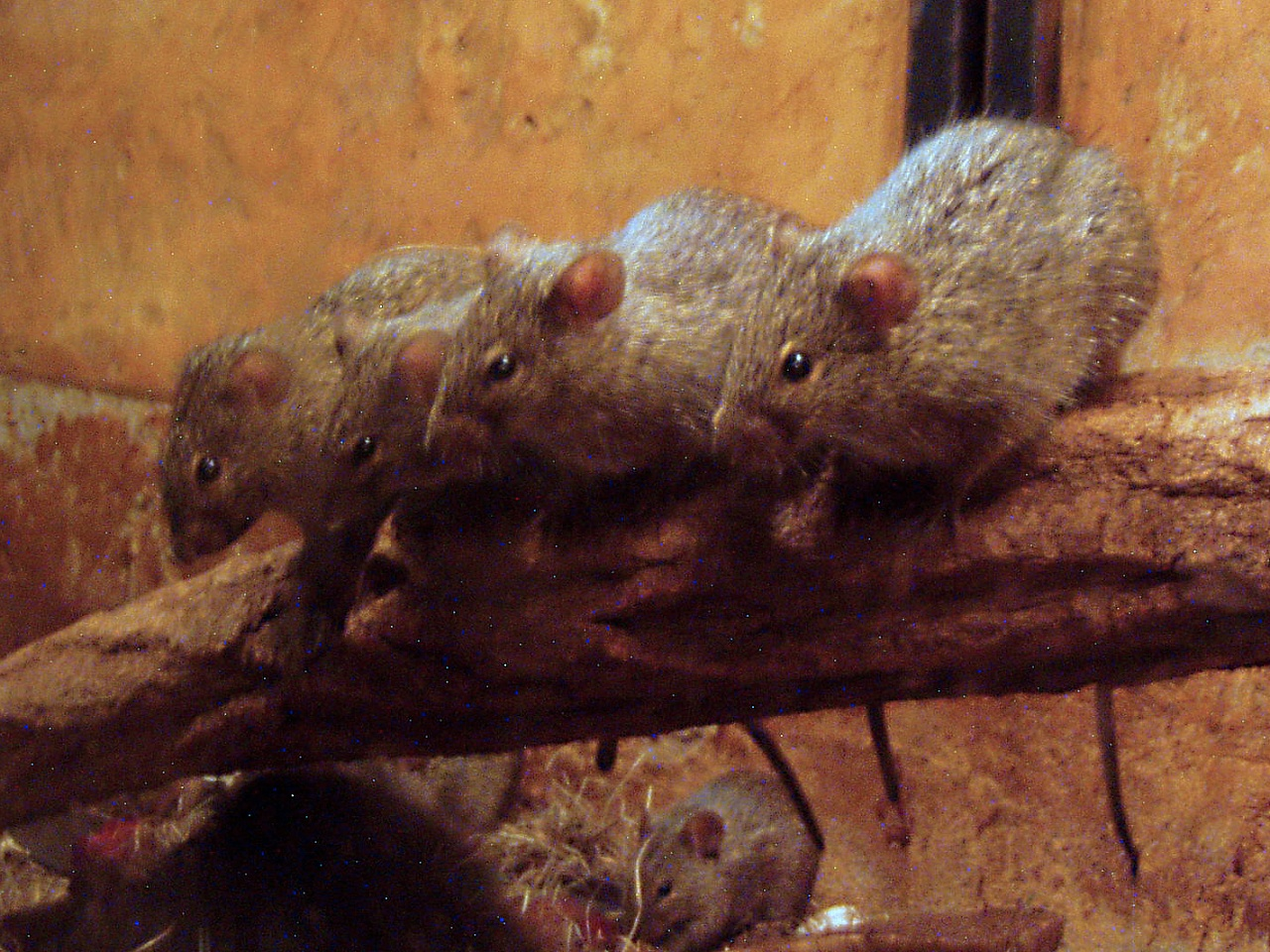
- African grass rat (Arvicanthis niloticus)
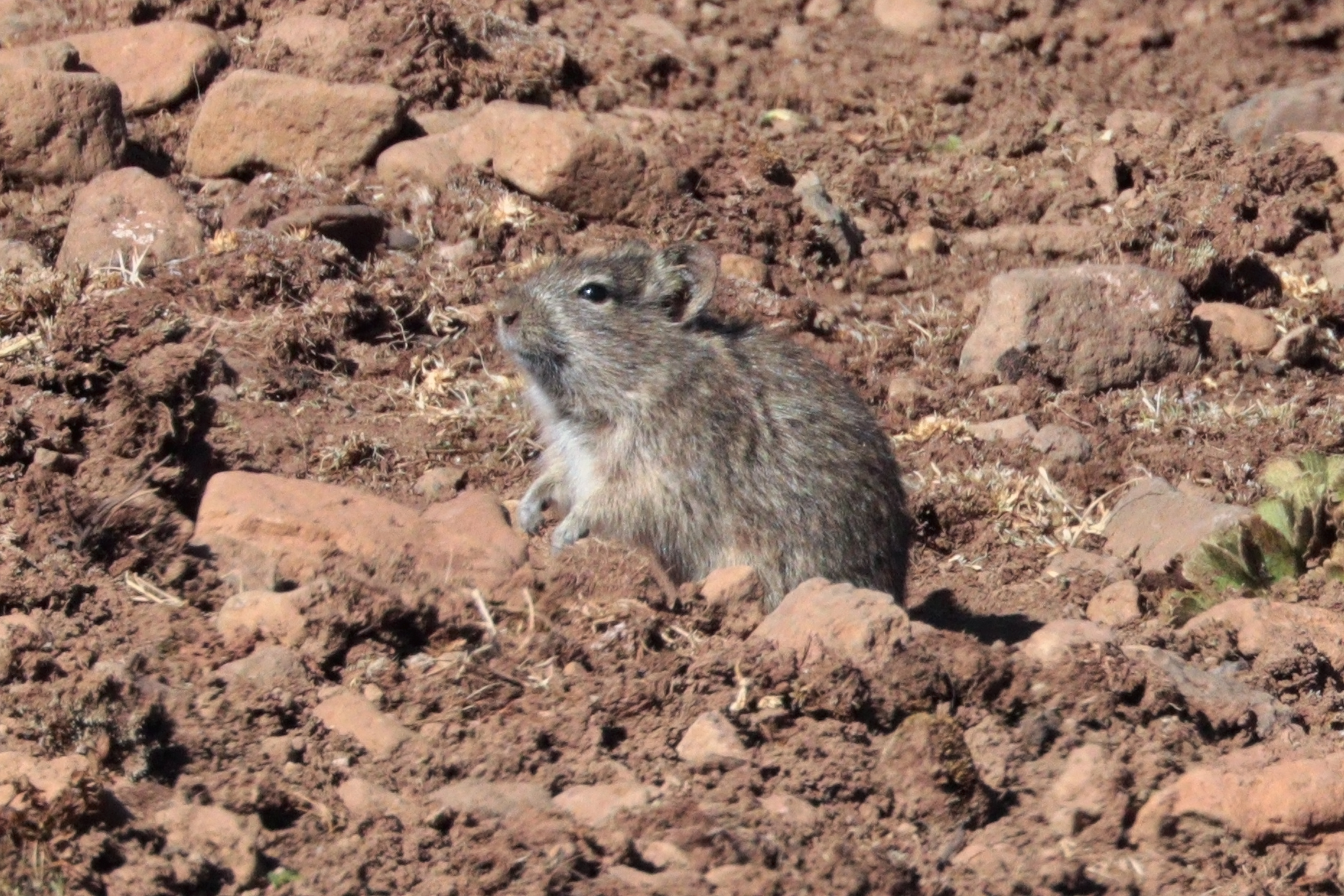
- Blick's grass rat (Arvicanthis blicki)

Scientific classification
- Kingdom: Animalia
- Phylum: Chordata
- Class: Mammalia
- Order: Rodentia
- Family: Muridae
- Tribe: Arvicanthini
- Genus: Arvicanthis; Lesson, 1842

Type species
- Lemmus niloticus

Species
- Arvicanthis abyssinicus Arvicanthis ansorgei Arvicanthis blicki Arvicanthis nairobae Arvicanthis neumanni Arvicanthis niloticus Arvicanthis rufinus

= Arvicanthis =

Arvicanthis Temporal range: Early Pliocene–Recent

Genus of rodents

Arvicanthis (also commonly known as unstriped grass mice, unstriped grass rats, or kusu rats) is a genus of rodent from Africa. They are found in abundance in a variety of open habitats. They are also diurnal.

This genus is considered to be major agricultural pests.

== Distribution ==
This genus has a wide distribution across Africa. However in their present state they are restricted the savannas of sub-Saharan Africa and the Nile Valley. The Horn of Africa contains four endemic species (A. abyssinicus, A. dembeensis, A. blicki and A. somalicus). They can also be found at a variety of different altitudes from arid grasslands up to the alpine moorlands at 4300 meters above sea level.

== Taxonomy ==
This genus is a Murid rodent belonging to the tribe Arvicanthini. The genus is split into two groups, the “ansorgei group” and the “niloticus group”. The former contains four species while the latter is more diverse containing more species. Genetic evidence indicates that the extinct Canariomys is also nested within this genus.

=== Evolutionary history ===
They evolved during the early Pliocene epoch but experienced a period of rapid radiation during the early to middle Pleistocene epoch. This diversification started in Eastern Africa followed by repeated dispersals west (Sudano-Guinean savannas) and south (Masai steppe).

Currently, their range is restricted from the sub-Saharan savannas to the Nile Valley. In contrast, their range during the Quaternary period included most of Northern Africa.

== Species ==
Arvicanthis currently contains seven described species which are listed below:

- Abyssinian grass rat, Arvicanthis abyssinicus Rüppell, 1842
- Sudanian grass rat, Arvicanthis ansorgei Thomas, 1910
- †Arvicanthis arambourgi Lesson, 1842
- Blick's grass rat, Arvicanthis blicki Frick, 1914
- Nairobi grass rat, Arvicanthis nairobae J. A. Allen, 1909
- Neumann's grass rat, Arvicanthis neumanni Matschie, 1894
- African grass rat, Arvicanthis niloticus É. Geoffroy, 1803
- Guinean grass rat, Arvicanthis rufinus Temminck, 1853
