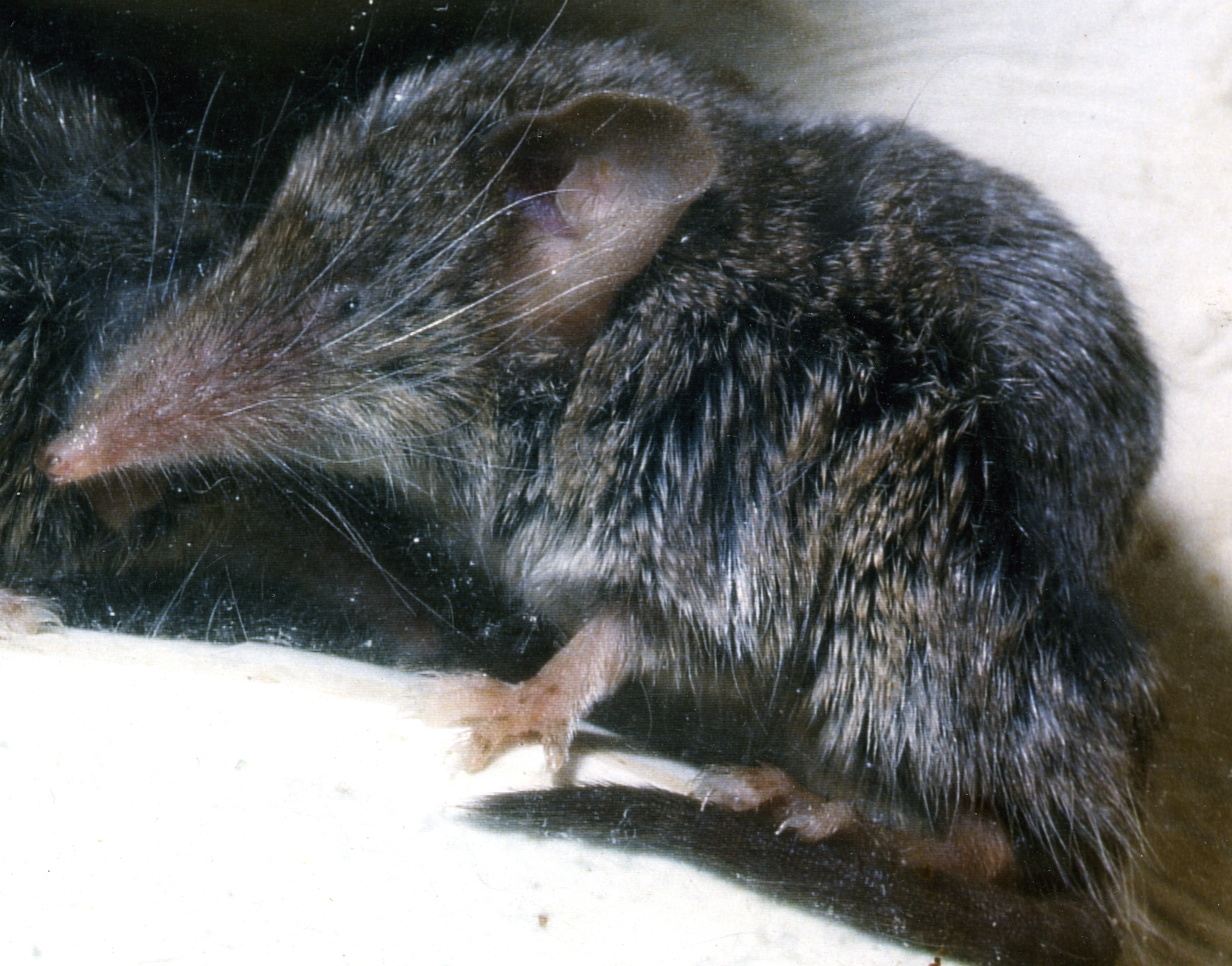

Conservation status
- Endangered (IUCN 3.1)

Scientific classification
- Kingdom: Animalia
- Phylum: Chordata
- Class: Mammalia
- Order: Eulipotyphla
- Family: Soricidae
- Genus: Crocidura
- Species: C. canariensis

Binomial name
- Crocidura canariensis Hutterer, Lopez-Jurado & Vogel, 1987
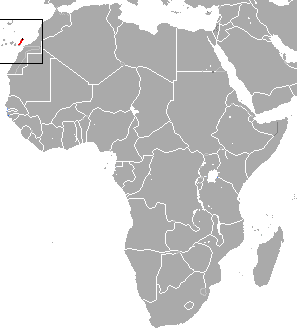
- Canarian shrew range

= Canarian shrew =

Species of mammal

The Canarian shrew (Crocidura canariensis) is a species of mammal in the family Soricidae. It is endemic to the Canary Islands, specifically the eastern islands of Lanzarote, Fuerteventura, Lobos, and Mount Clara. It used to be found on Graciosa, Canary Islands and Alegranza. Its natural habitat is subtropical or tropical dry shrubland. It is threatened by habitat loss.
