= Lava mouse =

Lava mouse Temporal range: Late Pleistocene-Holocene
- A life restoration of a lava mouse

Conservation status
- Extinct

Scientific classification
- Kingdom: Animalia
- Phylum: Chordata
- Class: Mammalia
- Order: Rodentia
- Family: Muridae
- Tribe: Murini
- Genus: †Malpaisomys; Hutterer, Lopez-Martinez & Michaux, 1988
- Species: †M. insularis

Binomial name
- †Malpaisomys insularis Hutterer, Lopez-Martinez & Michaux, 1988

Extinct species of rodent

The lava mouse (Malpaisomys insularis) is an extinct endemic rodent from the Canary Islands, Spain. It is the only species in the genus Malpaisomys.

The lava mouse is known from Holocene and Pleistocene deposits in the eastern Canary Islands, including Fuerteventura, Lanzarote, and nearby islets. Radiocarbon dates indicate that it became extinct after the European arrival in the archipelago sometime after 1270 AD, probably due to the introduction of rats.

The species is estimated to have a live body mass of around 90 grams (3.2 oz). A study of its skeletal characteristics suggested that the lava mouse lived in fissures opened in the lava fields. The morphology of its teeth indicates that it was an herbivore.

Its evolutionary relationships were unresolved due to its fairly generic morphology. Rodents on islands generally increase in size during the course of their evolution; the lava mouse was fairly small for an insular rodent (some 20 cm in overall length). Thus, it is more likely than not that it evolved from small Pliocene mainland genera Paraethomys, Occitanomys, or relatives thereof, than being a later derivative of the Deomyinae. A 2012 genomic study recovered it as a highly divergent lineage within the genus Mus sensu lato most closely related to Coelomys.

This rodent owes its name Malpaisomys to the Spanish word malpaís ("badlands"), denoting the lava fields where its fossil remains are sometimes found in cavities.

== See also ==
- Canariomys
- List of extinct animals
- List of extinct animals of Europe
