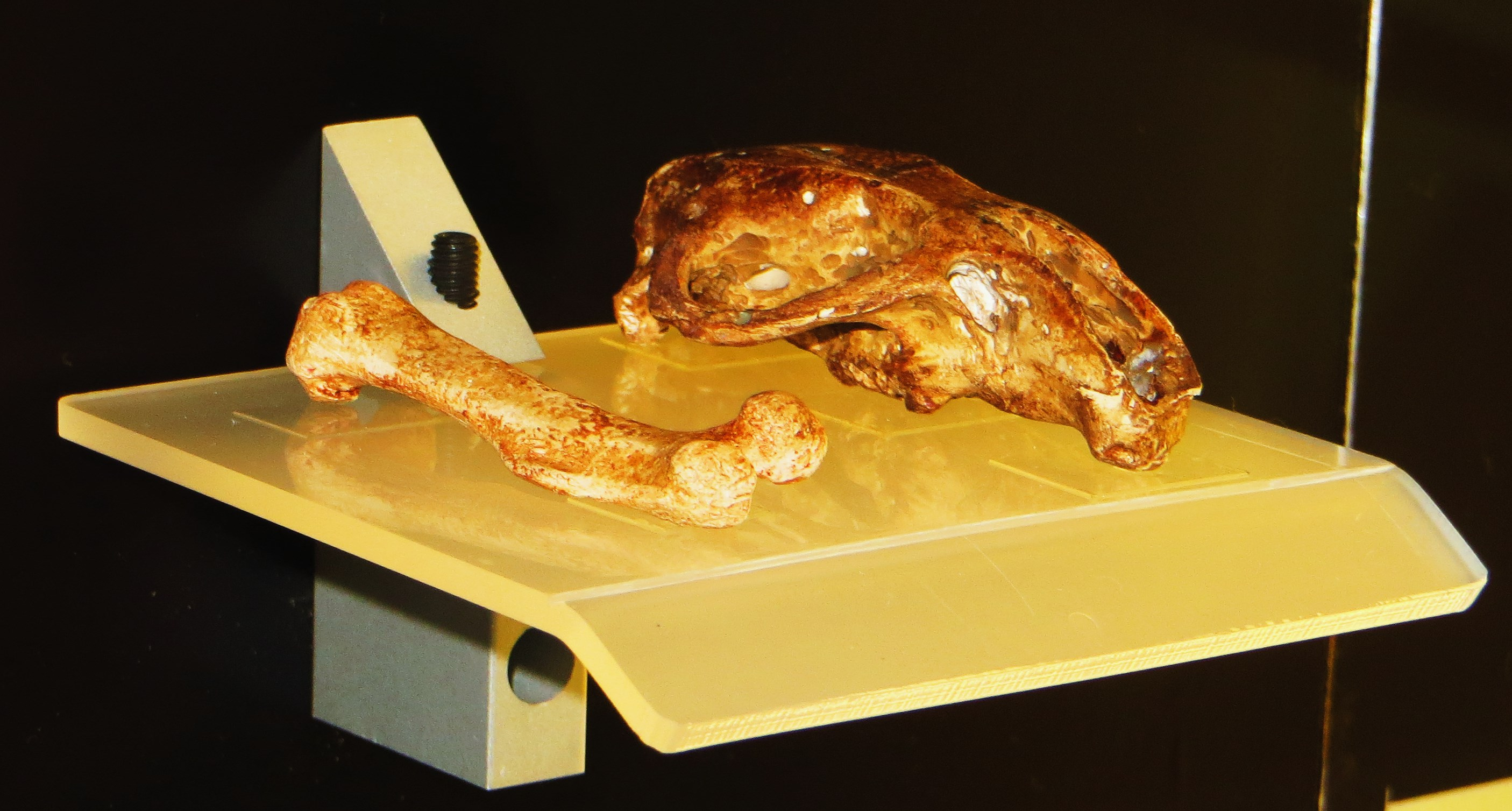
- Fossils in Museo de la Naturaleza y el Hombre in Santa Cruz de Tenerife.

Scientific classification
- Kingdom: Animalia
- Phylum: Chordata
- Class: Mammalia
- Order: Rodentia
- Family: Muridae
- Genus: †Canariomys
- Species: †C. tamarani

Binomial name
- †Canariomys tamarani Lopez-Martinez & Telesfóro Bravo

= Gran Canaria giant rat =

Gran Canaria giant rat Temporal range: Holocene

Extinct species of rodent

The Gran Canaria giant rat (Canariomys tamarani) is an extinct species of murid rodent belonging to the genus Canariomys endemic to the island of Gran Canaria (Canary Islands, Spain).

This rodent is known from Holocene to pre-Hispanic fossil remains found at several places on the island of Gran Canaria, the youngest of which have been dated to shortly before the beginning of the Common Era. This species was previously listed in the 2000 IUCN Red List of Threatened Species as extinct, but was removed from the list because it is now considered to have gone extinct before 1500 CE.

Another giant rat of the Canary Islands was the Tenerife giant rat, Canariomys bravoi. It is believed that the arrival of humans and the introduction of feral dogs led to the extinction of both species.

== Description ==
The giant rat had an estimated typical head-and-body length of 28.7 cm (11.3 in) and tail length of 20 cm (7.9 in); its average body weight is believed to have been in the 0.75–1.35 kg (26–48 oz) range.

== Palaeoecology ==
The giant rat was herbivorous and terrestrial, with some digging skills and the ability to climb trees. Its dental microwear shows that it ate a diverse array of plants but that it did not consume grass.

== See also ==
- List of extinct animals
- List of extinct animals of Europe
