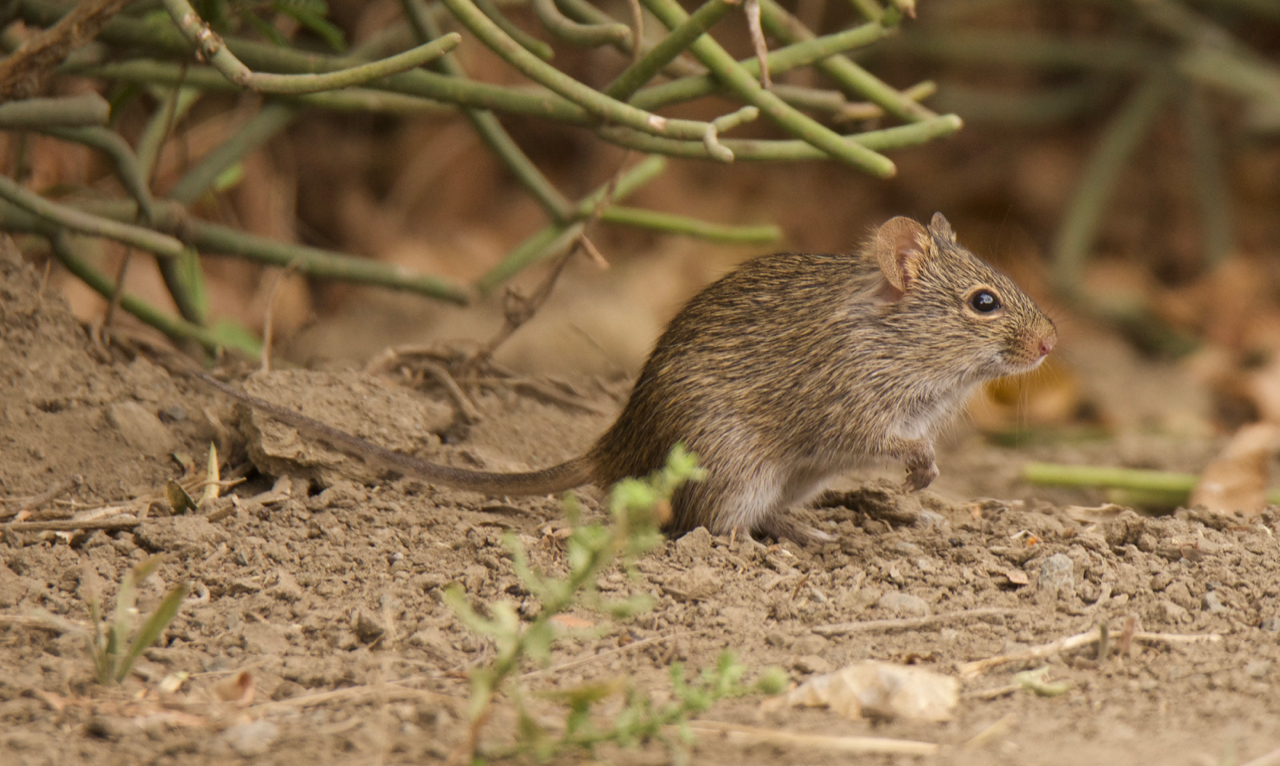
- Arvicanthis niloticus in Tanzania

Conservation status
- Least Concern (IUCN 3.1)

Scientific classification
- Kingdom: Animalia
- Phylum: Chordata
- Class: Mammalia
- Order: Rodentia
- Family: Muridae
- Genus: Arvicanthis
- Species: A. niloticus

Binomial name
- Arvicanthis niloticus (É. Geoffrey, 1803)

= African grass rat =

Species of rodent

The African grass rat (Arvicanthis niloticus) is a species of rodent in the family Murinae.

== Taxonomy ==
The species is divided into the following six subspecies.

- A. n. niloticus: Nile, Egypt;
- A. n. dembeensis (Rüppell, 1842): Sudan, Ethiopia, Eritrea; Tanzania, Kenya, Burundi, Uganda, Democratic Republic of Congo;
- A. n. naso (Pocock, 1934): Yemen;
- A. n. rhodesiae (St.Leger, 1932): Zambia;
- A. n. solatus (Thomas, 1925): Senegal; Mauritania, Mali, Niger, Chad, Burkina Faso, Ghana, Nigeria, Cameroon and Central African Republic;
- A. n. testicularis (Sundevall, 1843): upper Nile, central Sudan.

== Description ==
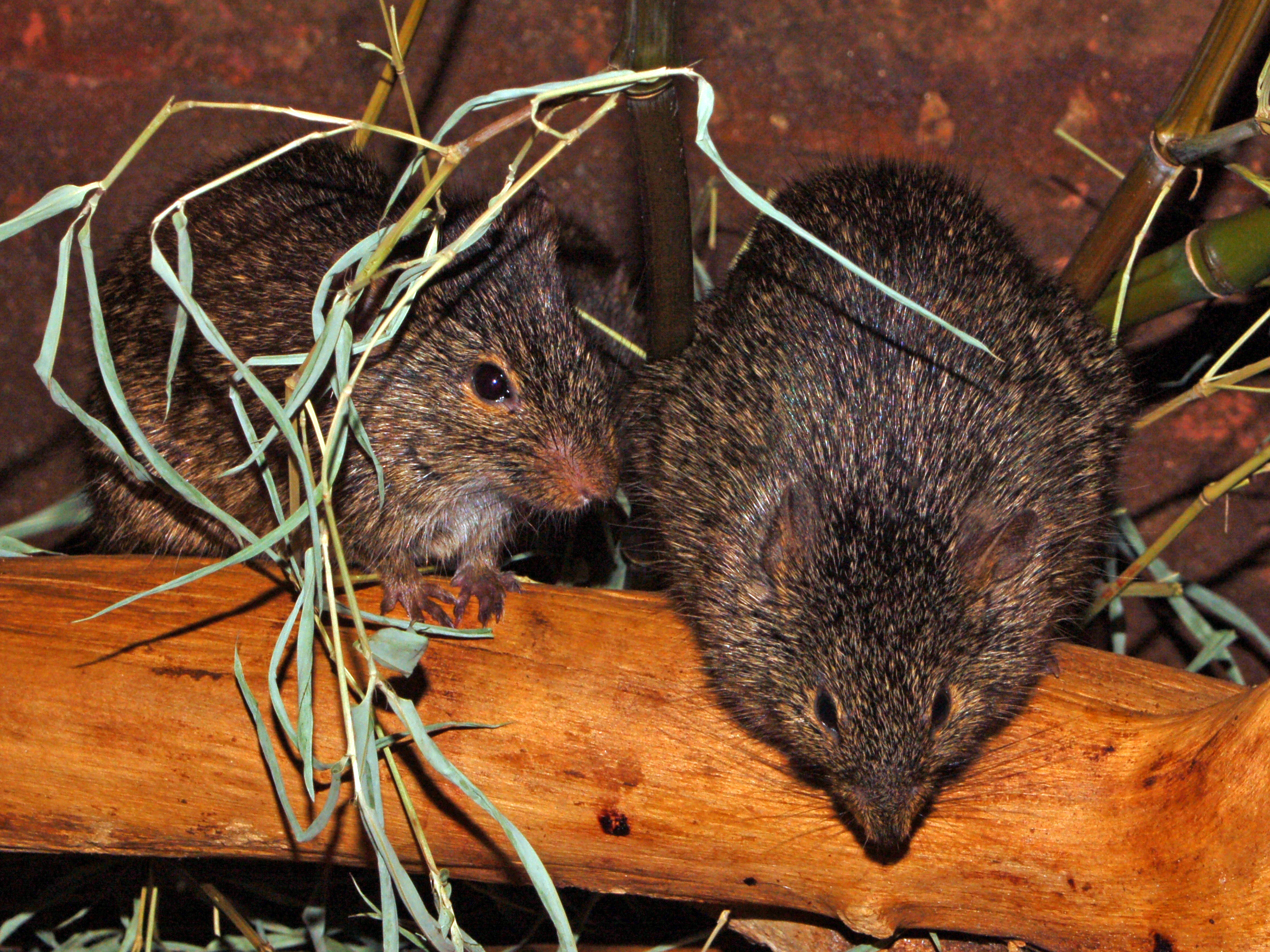
Arvicanthis niloticus at the Prague Zoo

Arvicanthis niloticus is a rodent of medium size, with the length of the head and of the body between 159 and 202 mm, the length of the tail between 125 and 173 mm, the length of the foot between 33 and 42 mm, the length of the ears between 19 and 23 mm and a weight up to 201 g.

The fur is rough. The upper parts of individual hairs are yellowish with blackish tips. Long yellow or orange hairs are present on the bottom. A dorsal dark stripe more or less distinct extends from the head to the base of the tail. The ventral parts are whitish, with the base of the hairs blackish.

Areas where there are the whiskers, the eyes and a small patch behind each ear are orange. The legs are pink. The tail is shorter than the head and body, densely covered with hair, blackish above and white-yellowish below. The karyotype is 2n = 62, FN = 62-64.

== Distribution ==
It is mainly distributed in the Sahel and the sudano-zambesian Savanna belt, namely Benin, Burkina Faso, Burundi, Central African Republic, Chad, Democratic Republic of the Congo, Ivory Coast, Eritrea, Ethiopia, Gambia, Ghana, Kenya, Malawi, Mauritania, Niger, Nigeria, Senegal, Sierra Leone, Somalia, Sudan, Tanzania, Togo, Uganda, and Zambia. Populations also occur in Algeria, Egypt, and Yemen.

== Cycle of life ==
Despite its wide distribution and commonness, little is known about the biology and actual occurrence of the species. It reproduces mainly between June and November. The females give birth to 5-6 small cubs at least 3-4 times a year. Life expectancy in the wild is 2.5–3 years.

== Habitat ==
Its natural habitats are dry savanna, moist savanna, subtropical or tropical moist shrubland, arable land, pastureland, rural gardens, urban areas, irrigated land, and seasonally flooded agricultural land.

== Use as an animal model for Type 2 Diabetes ==
The Nile rat has gained traction as a useful nutritional model to study Type 2 Diabetes (T2DM). The Nile Rat gets Metabolic Syndrome that develops into diet-induced Type 2 Diabetes that is similar to human T2DM: insulin resistance, hyperinsulinemia, increased body fat, hypertension, elevated Triglycerides with decreased High-Density Lipoproteins, and eventually hyperglycemia and beta cell failure resulting in depressed insulin and end-stage diabetes that includes severe ketosis. The beta cell failure follows the same course as the five-stage decline documented in humans with T2DM.
