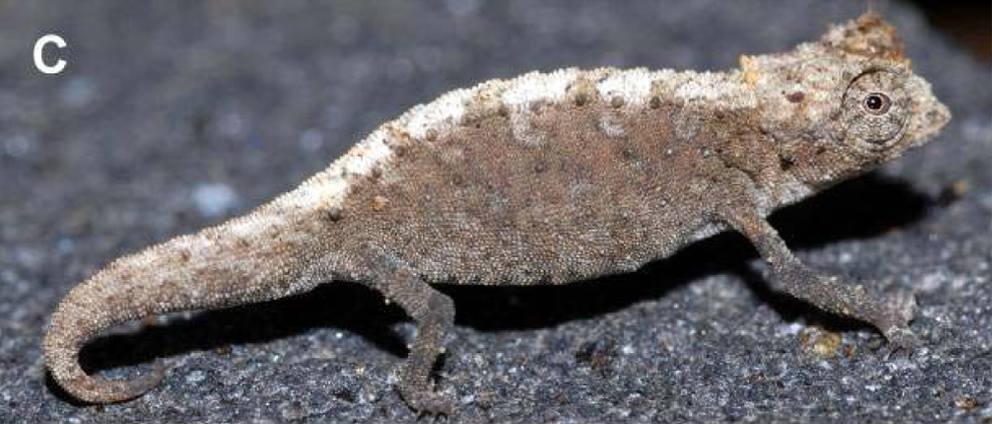
- Male Brookesia confidens
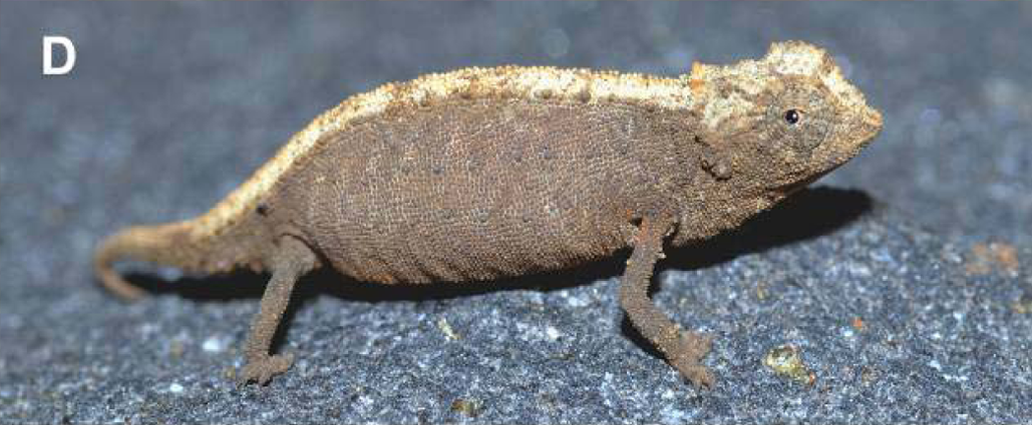
- Female Brookesia confidens

Conservation status
- Near Threatened (IUCN 3.1)

Scientific classification
- Kingdom: Animalia
- Phylum: Chordata
- Class: Reptilia
- Order: Squamata
- Suborder: Iguania
- Family: Chamaeleonidae
- Genus: Brookesia
- Species: B. confidens

Binomial name
- Brookesia confidens Glaw, Köhler, Townsend, & Vences, 2012
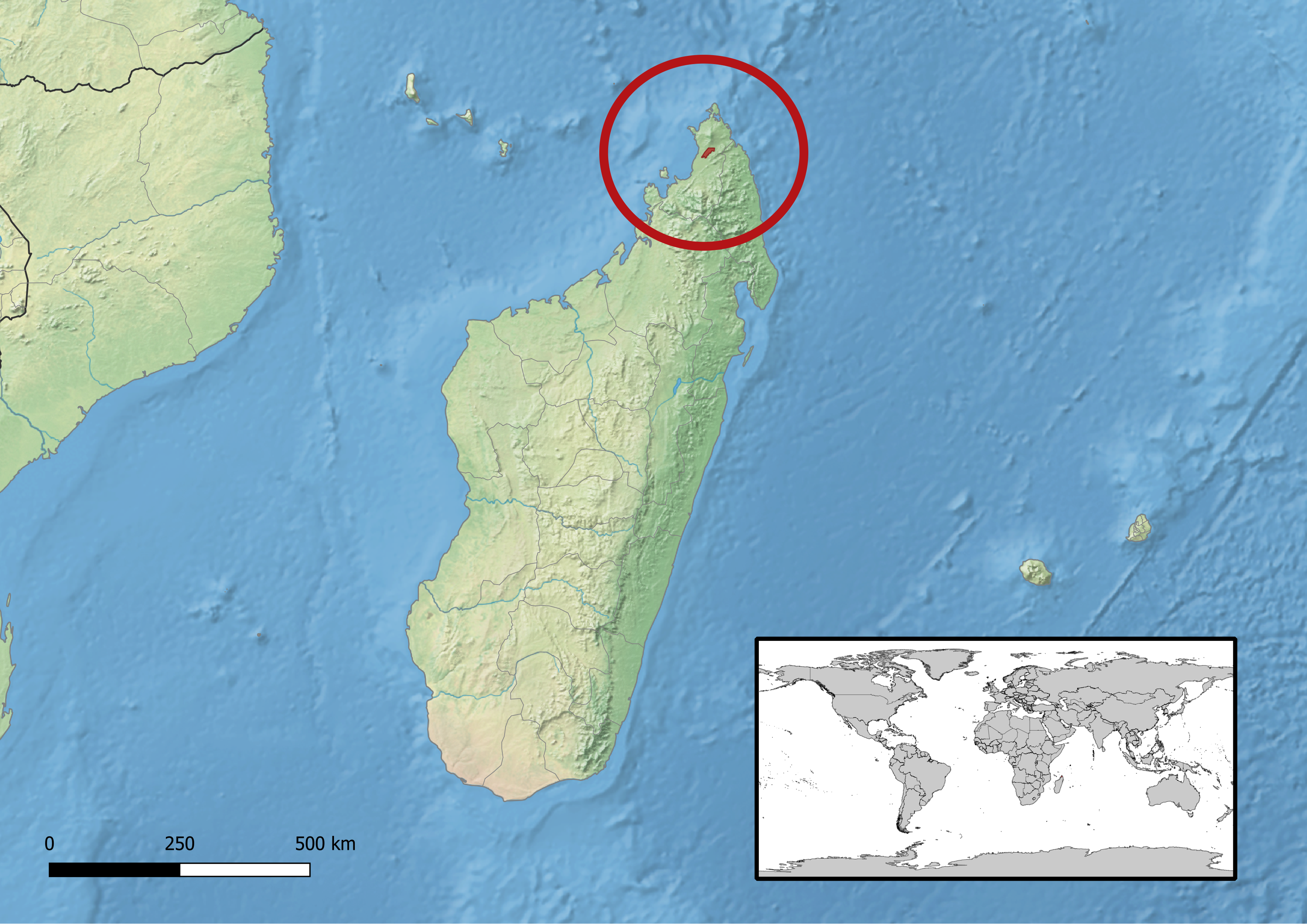

= Brookesia confidens =

Species of lizard

Brookesia confidens, also known as the leaf chameleon, is one of the world's smallest species of chameleons. It is endemic to the Ankarana Nature Reserve (Ankarana National Park) in Madagascar. It was first described in 2012 by F. Glaw, J. Koehler, T.M. Townsend and M. Vences.

== Distribution and habitat ==
Found in northern Madagascar, B. confidens is one of the world's smallest chameleons. It was discovered in the Ankarana National Nature Reserve. It was first described in 2012 by Glaw, Koehler, Townsend and Vences. The nature reserve where B. confidens can be found on is well-protected. Little habitat destruction is currently occurring that could impact the species.

== Description ==
Brookesia confidens is smaller than half of a human finger, and is roughly the size of a wedding ring. The snout–vent length of males is between 18.3 and 20.1 mm (0.72 and 0.79 in), and the total length is between 29.2 and 34.2 mm (1.15 and 1.35 in). The females are slightly larger, and have a snout-vent length between 20.6 and 22.6 mm (0.81 and 0.89 in), and a full length between 32.5 and 36.2 mm (1.28 and 1.43 in). It is the sister taxon of Brookesia tuberculata (Mount d'Ambre leaf chameleon). It is just larger than Brookesia micra. It looks identical to Brookesia desperata, Brookesia micra and Brookesia tristis.

== Taxonomy ==
Brookesia confidens is commonly known as the leaf chameleon.
