= Marojejy leaf chameleon =

Marojejy leaf chameleon may refer to:

- Brookesia griveaudi
- Brookesia betschi
