= Brookesia lineata =

Conservation status
- Endangered (IUCN 3.1)

Scientific classification
- Kingdom: Animalia
- Phylum: Chordata
- Class: Reptilia
- Order: Squamata
- Suborder: Iguania
- Family: Chamaeleonidae
- Genus: Brookesia
- Species: B. lineata

Binomial name
- Brookesia lineata Raxworthy & Nussbaum, 1995
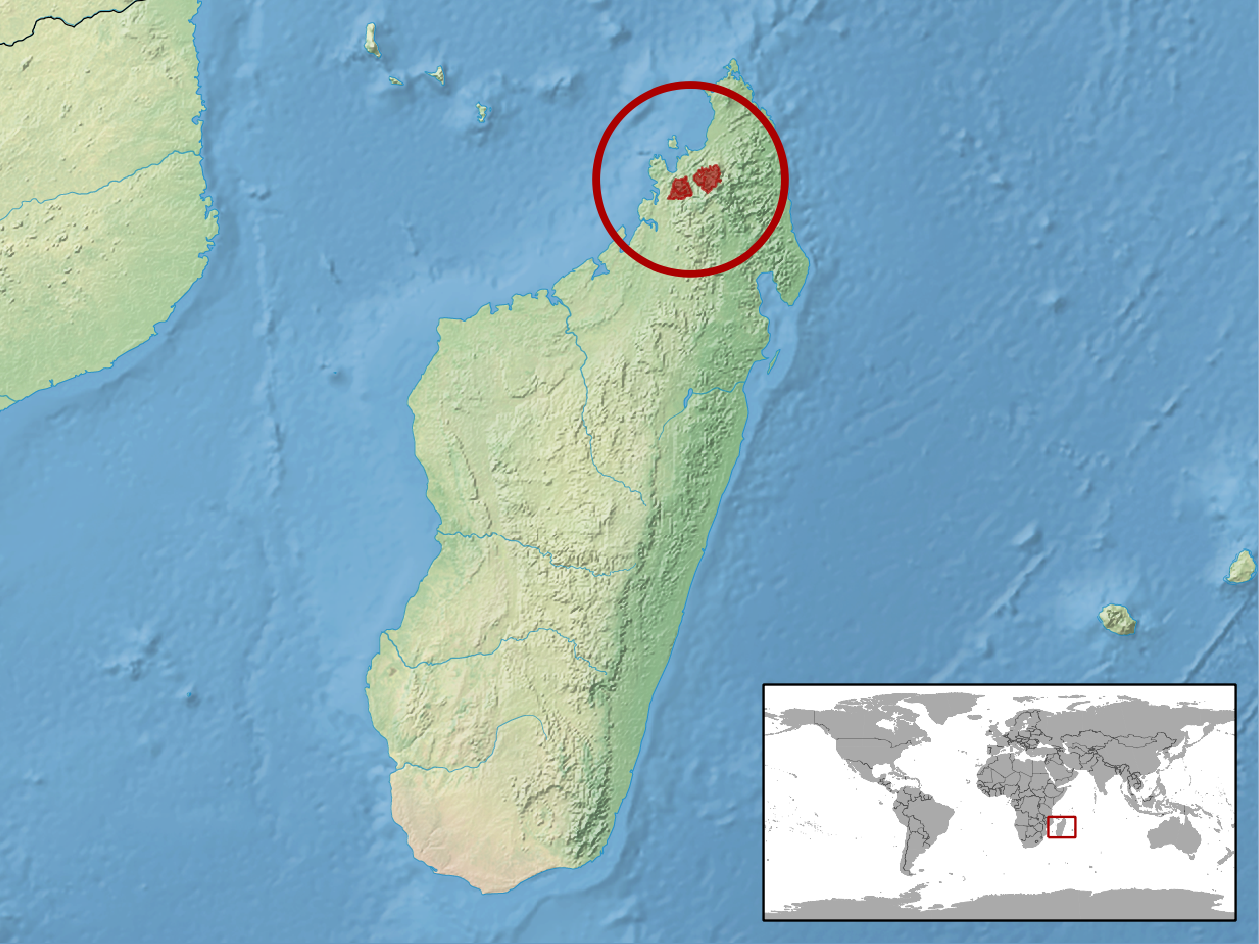

Species of lizard

Brookesia lineata, also commonly known as the lined leaf chameleon, is a species of chameleon that is endemic to Madagascar. It was first described by Raxworthy and Nussbaum in 1995. The International Union for Conservation of Nature ranked this as an endangered species.

== Distribution and habitat ==
Endemic to Madagascar, the lined leaf chameleon's type locality is the Manongarivo Reserve (Manongarivo Special Reserve). This chameleon has only been found at Manongarivo and Tsaratanana Reserves in Tsaratanana, Betsiboka at elevations around 1,200 m (3,900 ft) above mean sea level. It is found over a total area of 2,370 km^{2} (920 sq mi). The International Union for Conservation of Nature has ranked the lined leaf chameleon as endangered, as it is found where slash-and-burn agricultural methods are commonly used to make space to plant coffee. Its population trend is unknown. It is found in protected areas.

== Taxonomy ==
Brookesia lineata was initially described in 1995 by Raxworthy and Nussbaum. According to the ITIS, the taxonomic status of Brookesia lineata is valid, as of 2012. B. lineata is commonly known as the lined leaf chameleon. It has also been described by Necas in 1999: 277, and recently Townsend et al. in 2009. It was named after the Latin word linea which means "line" or "stripe".
