= Brookesia valerieae =

Conservation status
- Endangered (IUCN 3.1)

Scientific classification
- Kingdom: Animalia
- Phylum: Chordata
- Class: Reptilia
- Order: Squamata
- Suborder: Iguania
- Family: Chamaeleonidae
- Genus: Brookesia
- Species: B. valerieae

Binomial name
- Brookesia valerieae Raxworthy, 1991
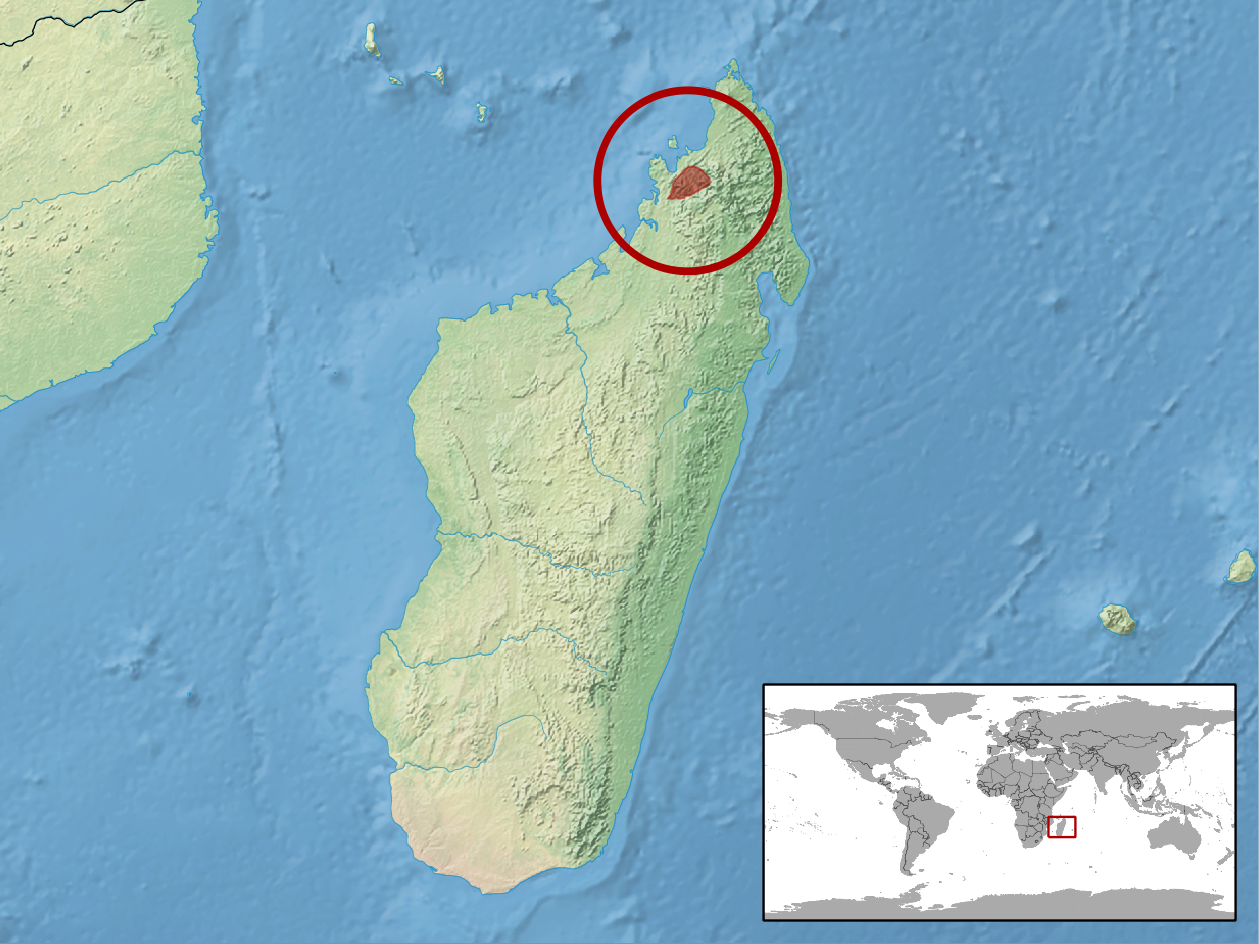

Species of lizard

Brookesia valerieae is a species of chameleon, a lizard in the family Chamaeleonidae. The species is endemic to Madagascar. It was first described by Raxworthy in 1991. The IUCN have classed this species as endangered, and it is affected by slash-and-burn agriculture. It is not a protected species.

== Etymology ==
The specific name, valerieae, is in honor of Valerie M. Raxworthy.

== Geographic range ==
B. valerieae is endemic to the Manongarivo Special Reserve (Manongarivo Reserve) in the region of Diana, Madagascar, which is also the species' type locality.

It has only been found at Manongarivo and the Ramena River, which are 7 km (4.3 mi) away from each other. If the species covers the whole area between the reserve and the river, it will be 2,589 km^{2} (1,000 sq mi) in area, but this has not been confirmed.

== Habitat ==
The preferred natural habitat of B. valerieae is forest, at altitudes of 500–700 m (1,600–2,300 ft).

== Reproduction ==
B. valerieae is oviparous.

== Conservation status ==
The International Union for Conservation of Nature have classed B. valerieae as an endangered species on their Red List of Threatened Species, as the scale of habitat loss is very high in that area, and is mainly affected by the slash-and-burn method of agriculture. B. valerieae has been used as part of the pet trade/industry. The species occurs in some reserves, but it is currently not a protected species.

== Taxonomy ==
B. valerieae was initially described by English herpetologist Christopher John Raxworthy in 1991. Since 1991, it has been published on under that name at least three times: Glaw and Vences (1994: 239), Nečas (1999: 277), and Townsend et al. (2009). According to the Integrated Taxonomic Information System (ITIS), the taxonomic status of the species is valid.
