= Brookesia bekolosy =

Conservation status
- Endangered (IUCN 3.1)

Scientific classification
- Kingdom: Animalia
- Phylum: Chordata
- Class: Reptilia
- Order: Squamata
- Suborder: Iguania
- Family: Chamaeleonidae
- Genus: Brookesia
- Species: B. bekolosy

Binomial name
- Brookesia bekolosy Raxworthy & Nussbaum, 1995
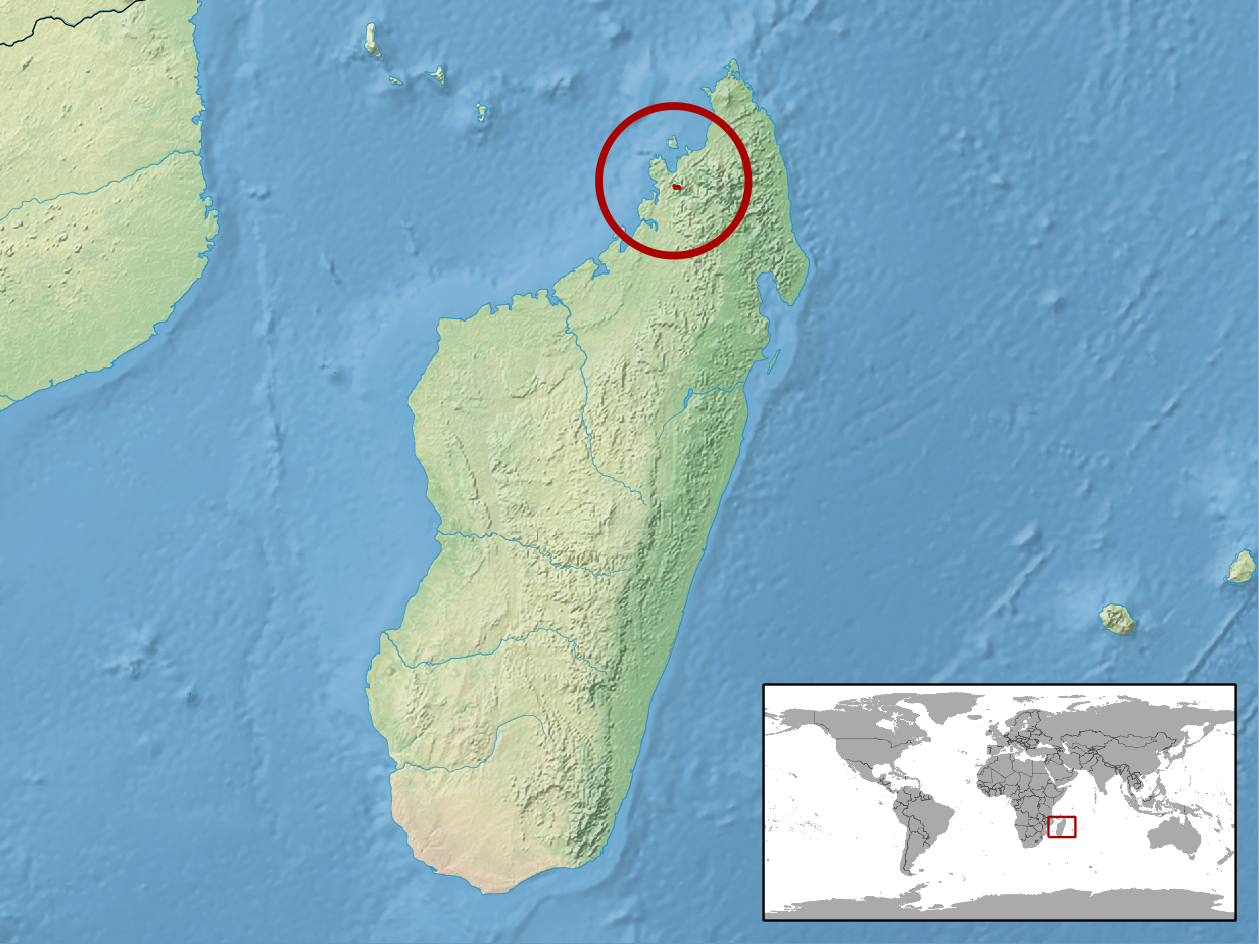

Species of lizard

Brookesia bekolosy also known as the Bekolosy leaf chameleon is a species of chameleon that is endemic to Madagascar. It was described by Raxworthy and Nussbaum in 1995. The International Union for Conservation of Nature classed the species as Endangered, and in 1992 the single specimen of it was recorded.

== Description and habitat ==
Brookesia bekolosy has only been collected once, being a single specimen from Bekolosy in the Manongarivo Special Reserve (Manongarivo Reserve) in the region of Diana in 1992. The species is believed to only be found at the Bekolosy Plateau, although further information is unknown. Its habitat is posited as between 1,000 and 2,000 m (3,300 and 6,600 ft) above mean sea level. Despite lack of specifics as to its extent, the International Union for Conservation of Nature classed B. bekolosy as an endangered species because it is not likely to cover more than 3,000 km^{2} (1,200 sq mi), and it is found in an area where logging is becoming common. If the species turns out to be only found at the Bekolosy Plateau, then the species will be classed as Critically Endangered, as it could only be found over an area of less than 100 km^{2} (39 sq mi), and will decline in this area.

== Taxonomy ==
Brookesia bekolosy was first described by Raxworthy and Nussbaum in 1995. Necas recorded the species as Brookesia bekolosy in 1999: 276. According to the ITIS (ITIS), the taxonomic status of the Brookesia bekolosy is valid, as of 2012.
