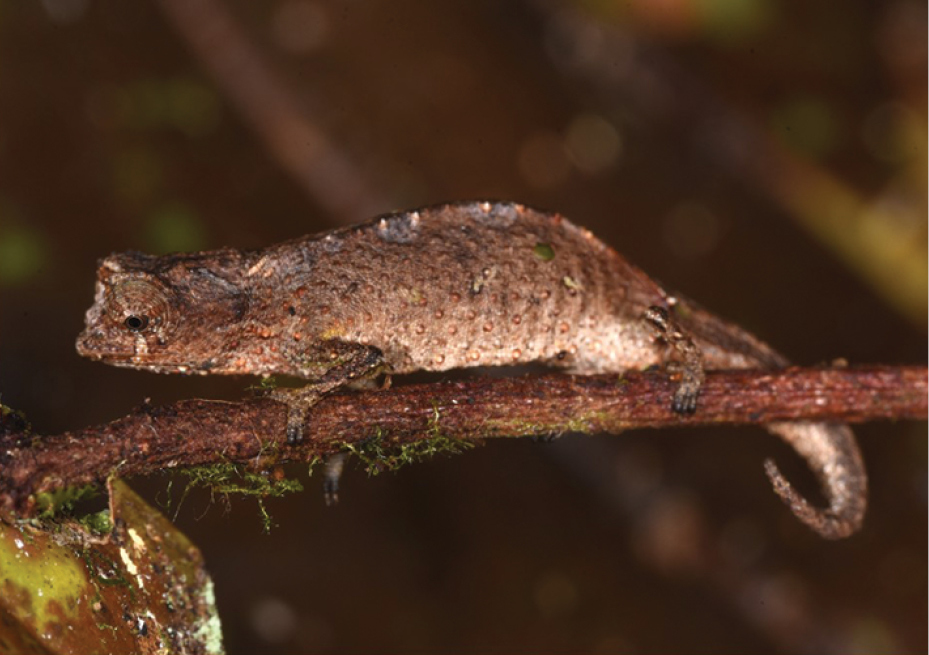

Scientific classification
- Kingdom: Animalia
- Phylum: Chordata
- Class: Reptilia
- Order: Squamata
- Suborder: Iguania
- Family: Chamaeleonidae
- Genus: Brookesia
- Species: B. tedi

Binomial name
- Brookesia tedi Scherz, Köhler, Rakotoarison, Glaw, & Vences, 2019

= Brookesia tedi =

Species of lizard

Brookesia tedi is a species of chameleon. It is found in Madagascar.
