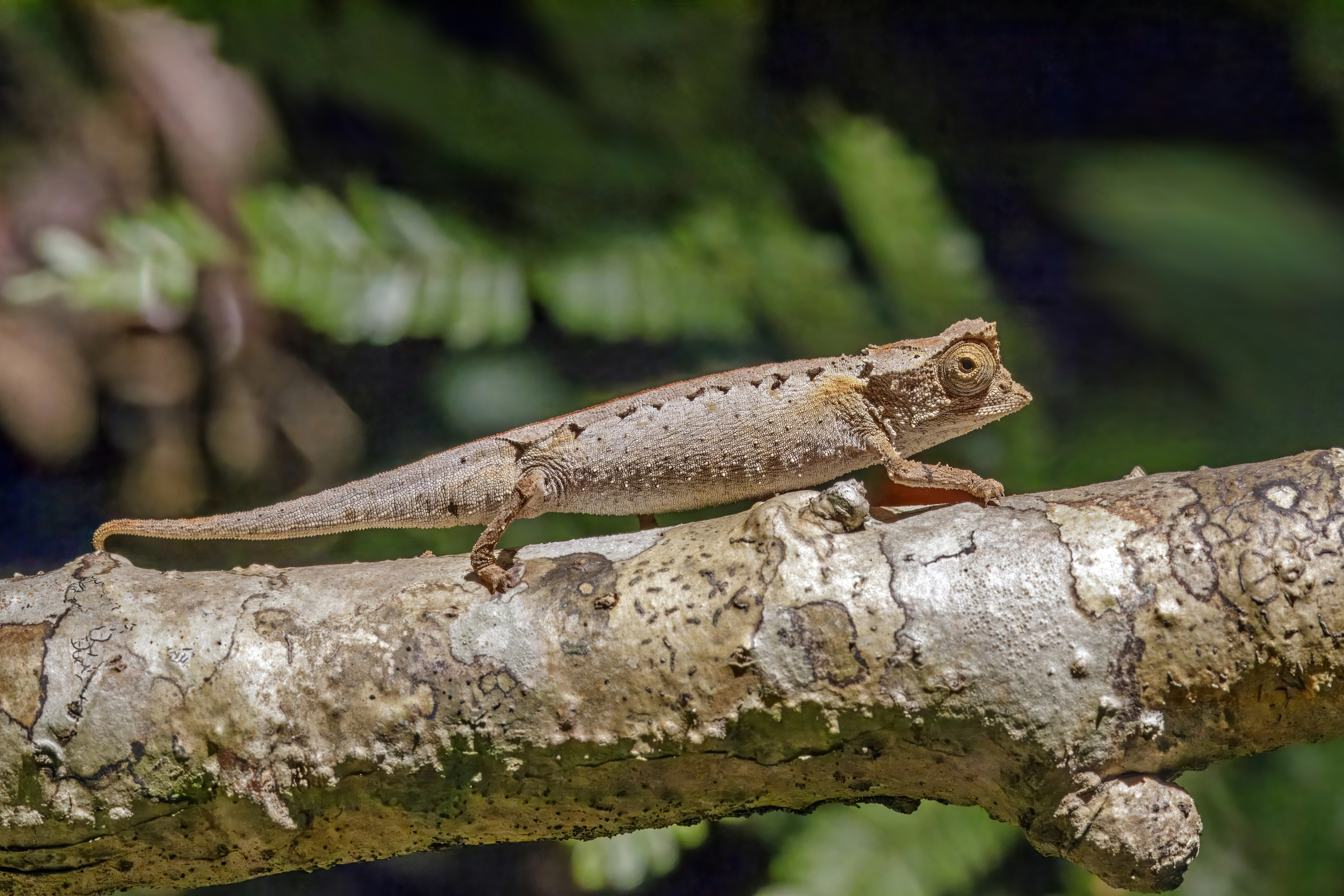
- in Lokobe Strict Reserve, Nosy Be

Conservation status
- Least Concern (IUCN 3.1)

Scientific classification
- Kingdom: Animalia
- Phylum: Chordata
- Class: Reptilia
- Order: Squamata
- Suborder: Iguania
- Family: Chamaeleonidae
- Genus: Brookesia
- Species: B. stumpffi

Binomial name
- Brookesia stumpffi Boettger, 1894
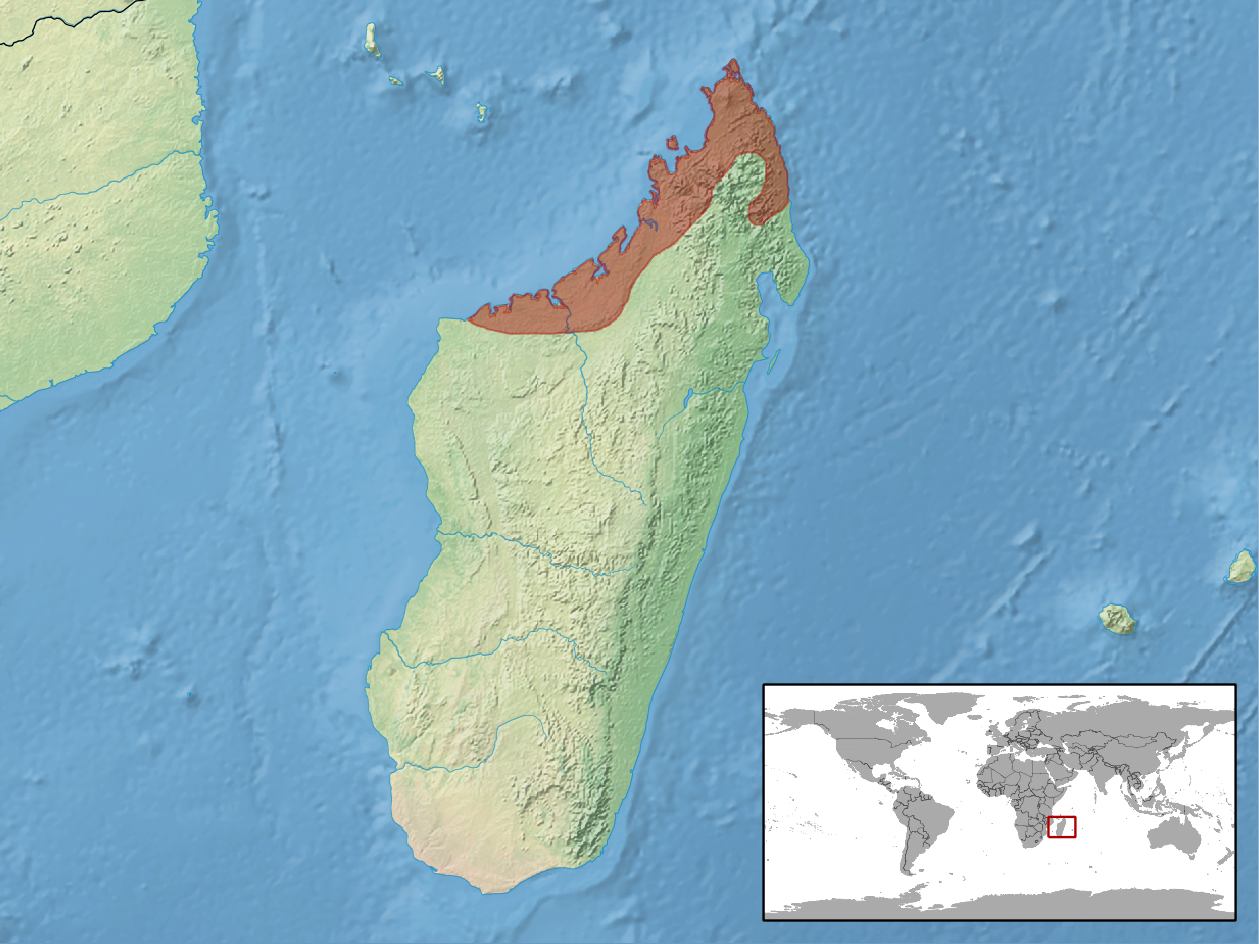

= Brookesia stumpffi =

Species of lizard

Brookesia stumpffi, also known as the plated leaf chameleon, is a species of chameleon found in some parts of Madagascar. It can be found in Nosy Bé, north-west Madagascar, Nosy Komba, and Nosy Sakatia.

== Taxonomy ==
Brookesia stumpffi was originally described by Oskar Boettger, a German zoologist, in 1894.

== Etymology ==
The specific name, stumpffi, is in honor of Anton Stumpff, who collected the holotype.

== Geographic range and habitat ==
Glaw and Vences found B. stumpffi on small islands of Madagascar away from the main land mass of the country in 2007. The species can only be found in certain parts of Madagascar; it can be found in Nosy Be (sometimes known as Nosy Bé), north-western Madagascar, Nosy Komba, and Nosy Sakatia, and is common in the rainforest. Brookesia stumpffi can be found up to a height of 150 metres (490 feet) above sea level, and can be found over an area of 61,884 kilometres (38,453 miles).

== Conservation status ==
There are no known major threats to the Brookesia stumpffi, and the species seems to be adaptable to "disturbed habitats". The species is sometimes kept as a pet and domesticated. The species is marked as Least Concern by the International Union for Conservation of Nature.

== Description ==
Brookesia stumpffi can grow to a total length (including tail) of up to 9 cm (3.5 in), and has a life expectancy of at least three years.

== Reproduction ==
During reproduction, the female B. stumpffi lays between three and five eggs, which hatch between 60 and 70 days later, provided they are at a temperature of 23 °C (73 °F).

== Diet ==
B. stumpffi feeds on insects such as crickets, fruit flies, cockroaches, wax moths (waxworms), and grasshoppers.

== Biology ==
During the day, the body temperature of B. stumpffi is between 22 and 25 °C (72 and 77 °F), and is 20 °C (68 °F) during the night.
