= Brookesia exarmata =

Conservation status
- Endangered (IUCN 3.1)

Scientific classification
- Kingdom: Animalia
- Phylum: Chordata
- Class: Reptilia
- Order: Squamata
- Suborder: Iguania
- Family: Chamaeleonidae
- Genus: Brookesia
- Species: B. exarmata

Binomial name
- Brookesia exarmata Schimmenti & Jesu, 1996
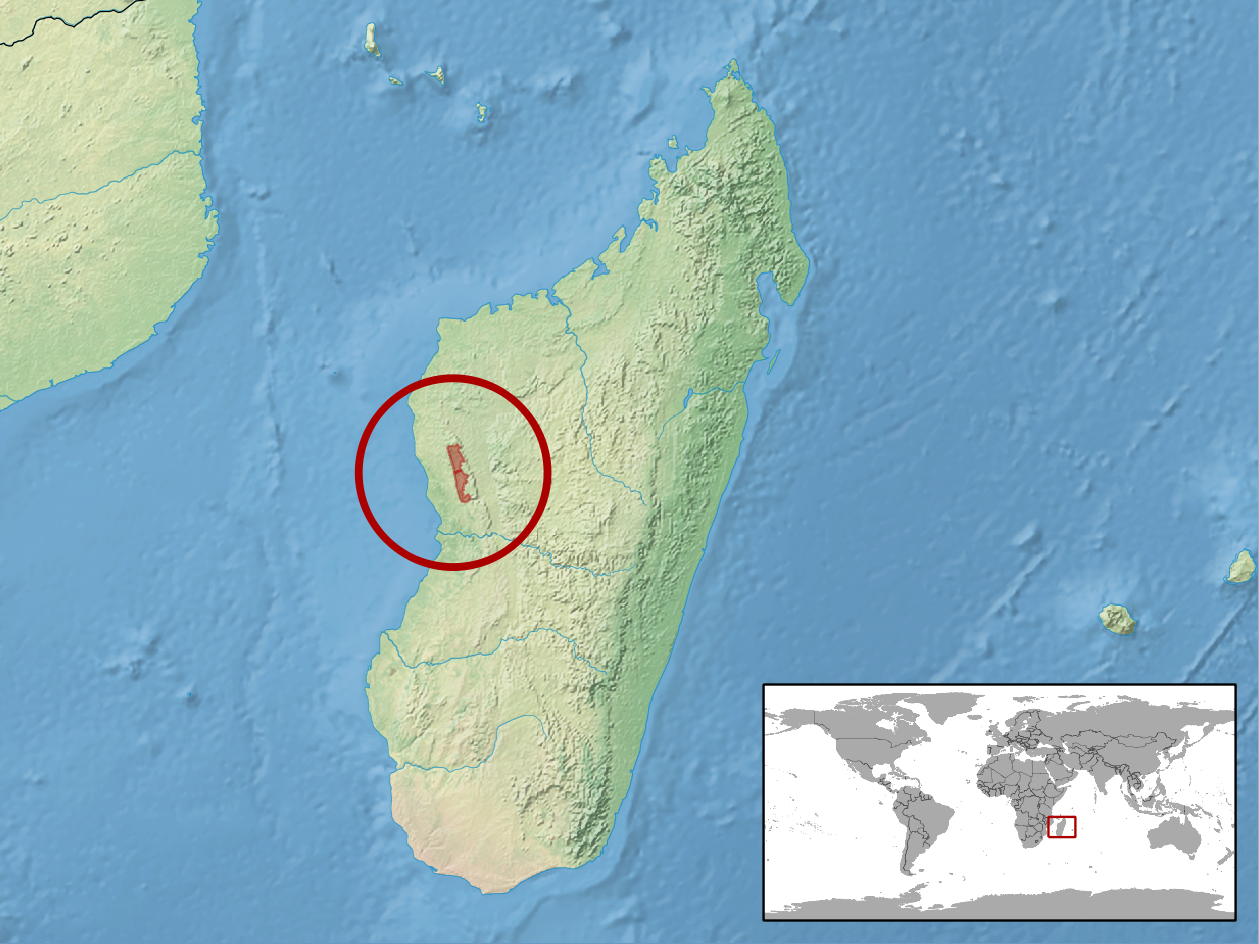

Species of lizard

Brookesia exarmata, also known as the dwarf chameleon, is a species of chameleon endemic to Madagascar. It was first described by Schimmenti and Jesu in 1996, and the International Union for Conservation of Nature (IUCN) has classed it as an endangered species of animal.

== Distribution and habitat ==
Brookesia exarmata is endemic to Madagascar, where it is only found in its type localities, which is the River Ambodyreana, Tsingy de Bemaraha Strict Nature Reserve, in west-central Madagascar. It can be found over an area of 1,991 km^{2} (769 sq mi), and the habitat of the species is in decline due to logging and forest fires. B. exarmata can be found at elevations between 100 and 563 m (328 and 1,847 ft) above mean sea level. It is found in a protected area. The IUCN has classed B. exarmata as an endangered species.

== Description ==
The dwarf chameleon is one of the smallest species in the chameleon genus Brookesia. It has a narrow head, and is coloured beige and brown. The species is 45 mm (1.8 in) at full length, with 20 mm (0.79 in) of that being the tail. It sleeps at around 15 cm (5.9 in) above the ground on twigs and/or stems. When threatened, it will stiffen its body and clutch its legs, and then fall to the ground, until it feels safe.

== Taxonomy ==
Brookesia exarmata was first described in 1996 by Schimmenti and Jesu, and was described twice since that year; by Necas in 1999: 277, and most recently, by Townsend et al. in 2009. It is commonly known as the Dwarf Chameleon due to its small size.
