= Brookesia betschi =

Conservation status
- Near Threatened (IUCN 3.1)

Scientific classification
- Kingdom: Animalia
- Phylum: Chordata
- Class: Reptilia
- Order: Squamata
- Suborder: Iguania
- Family: Chamaeleonidae
- Genus: Brookesia
- Species: B. betschi

Binomial name
- Brookesia betschi Brygoo, Blanc & Domergue, 1974
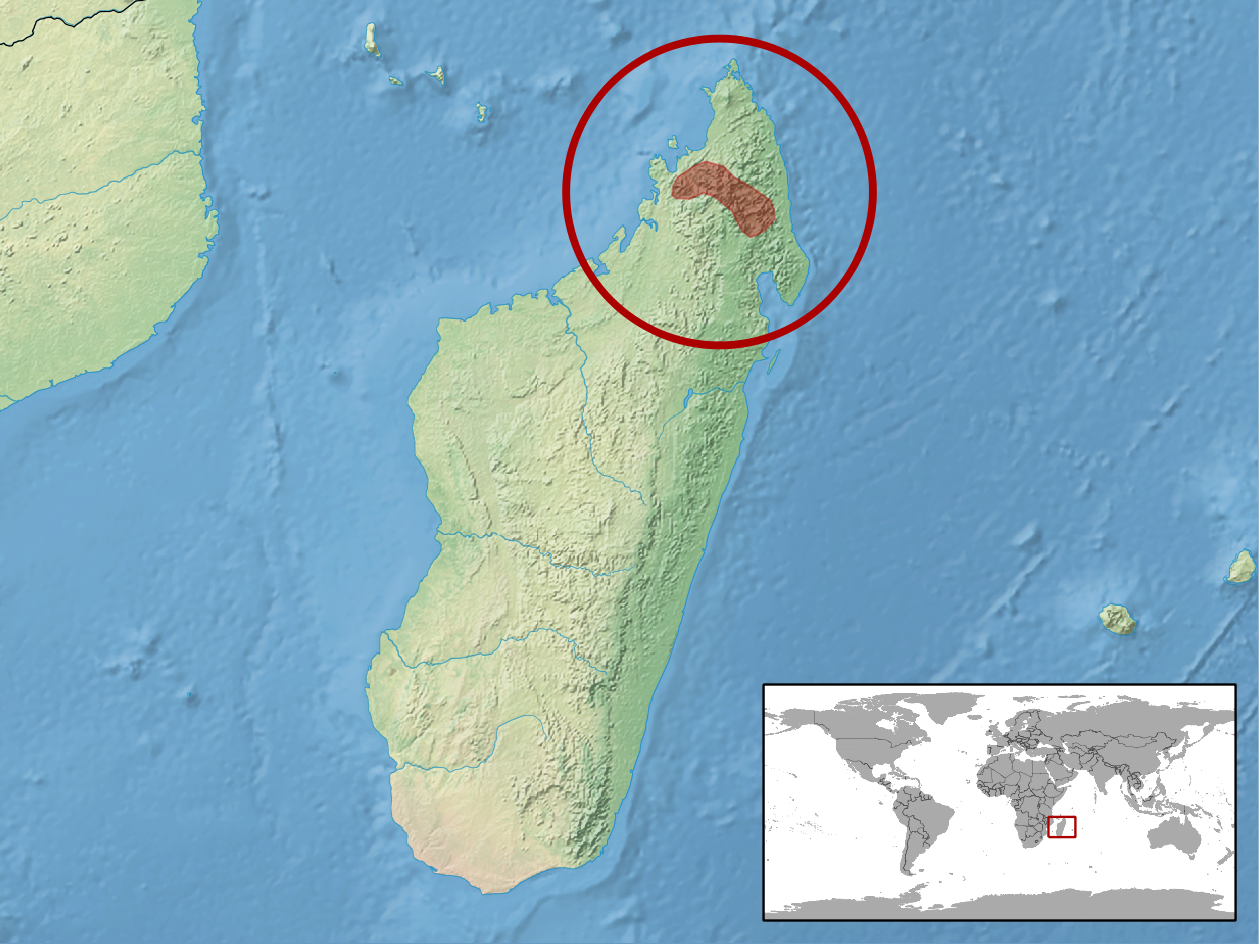

Species of lizard

Brookesia betschi, commonly known as Blanc's leaf chameleon or the Marojejy leaf chameleon, is a species of lizard in the family Chamaeleonidae. The species is endemic to Madagascar.

== Taxonomy ==
B. betschi was originally described by Édouard-Raoul Brygoo, Charles Pierre Blanc and Charles Antoine Domergue in 1974. The type specimen was collected in 1973, at 1,300 m (4,300 ft) in a forest in Marojejy.

== Etymology ==
The specific epithet, betschi, honours French biologist Jean-Marie Betsch.

== Geographic range and habitat ==
B. betschi is found in forests of northern Madagascar at altitudes of 1,150 to 1,650 m (3,770 to 5,410 ft). It is found in subhumid forests in the Manongarivo Reserve, the Anjanaharibe-Sud Reserve, Marojejy National Park and the Tsaratanana Reserve, as well as in forests between them, over a total area of 11,090 km^{2} (4,280 sq mi).

== Conservation status ==
The International Union for Conservation of Nature has rated the Marojejy leaf chameleon as Near Threatened due to the loss of rainforest in northern Madagascar. This species has very specialised microhabitat requirements and does not tolerate disturbance. It is threatened by destruction of the forest for agriculture by slash and burn and logging. Although its range is fragmented into a number of separate blocks, each one is thought to be large enough to support a viable population.

== Behaviour ==
The Marojejy leaf chameleon is diurnal, spending the day searching through leaf litter for insects and other small invertebrates. If it is disturbed, it remains motionless, relying on its cryptic colouration to provide camouflage. It perches on low trees and plants at night, when it is most easily spotted.

== Reproduction ==
B. betschi is oviparous.
