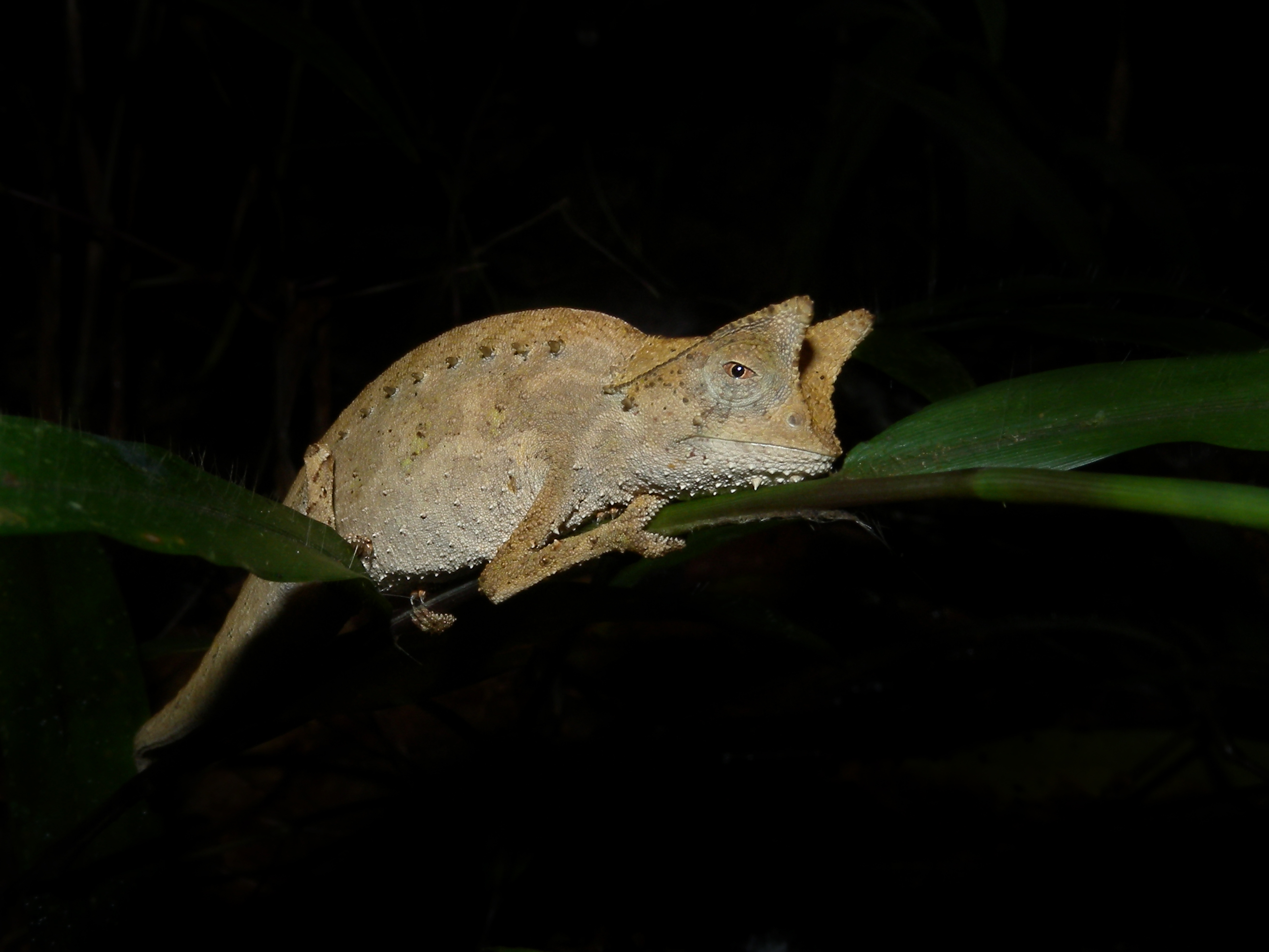

Conservation status
- Least Concern (IUCN 3.1)
- CITES Appendix II

Scientific classification
- Kingdom: Animalia
- Phylum: Chordata
- Class: Reptilia
- Order: Squamata
- Suborder: Iguania
- Family: Chamaeleonidae
- Genus: Brookesia
- Species: B. superciliaris

Binomial name
- Brookesia superciliaris (Kuhl, 1820)
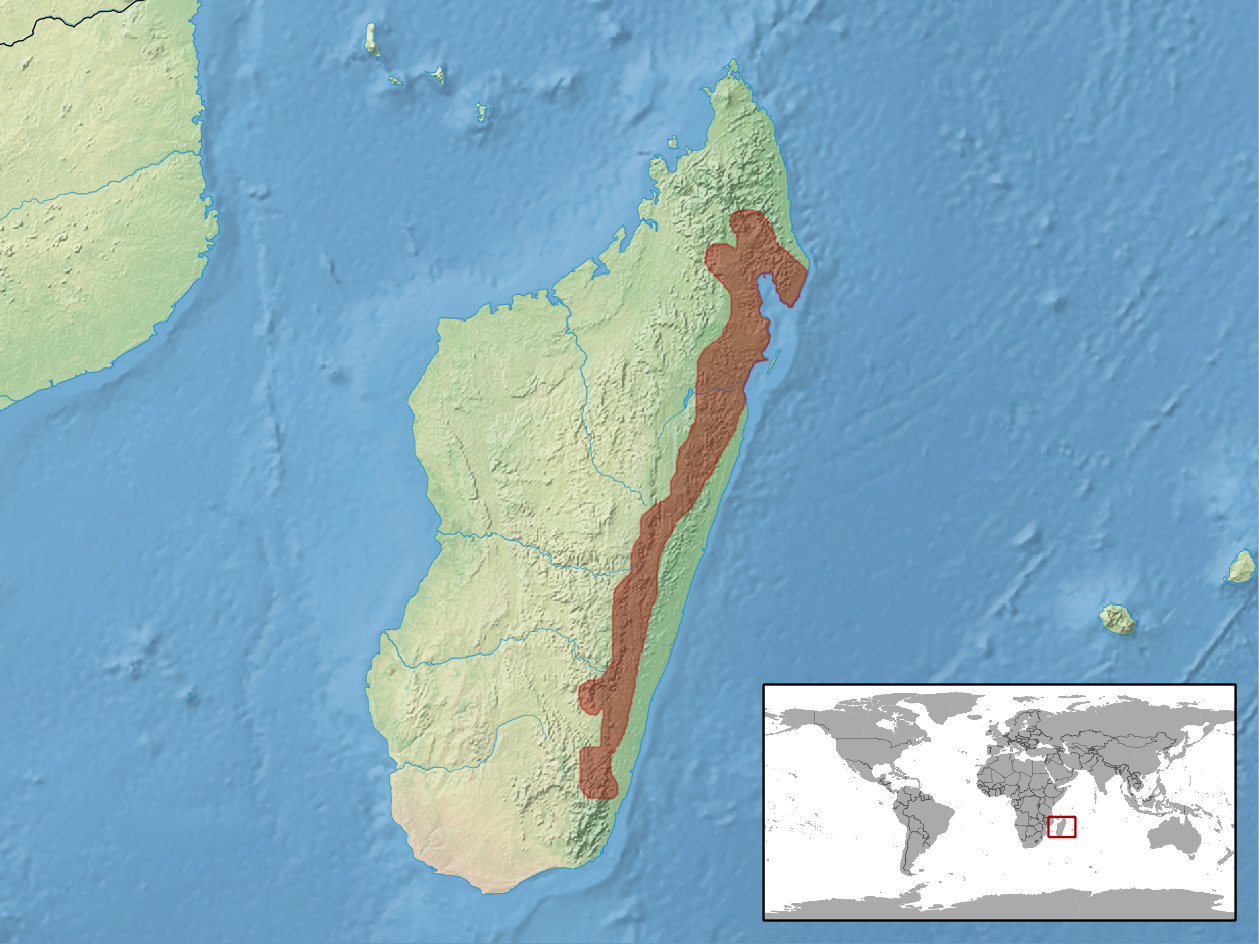

= Brown leaf chameleon =

Species of lizard

The brown leaf chameleon or stump-tailed chameleon (Brookesia superciliaris) is a small chameleon found along the eastern coast of Madagascar, as well as the island of Nosy Boraha. Its appearance mimics that of a dead leaf. The taxonomy is in need of revision.

== Description ==
The brown leaf chameleon is distinguished by its big forehead and its annoying look on its face and a laterally squashed body that resembles a rolled-up, dead leaf. The size and appearance of this chameleon varies considerably over its vast range, and it may be any shade of brown, beige, grey, olive, green, or dark red, but usually display colours and patterns that mimic a dead leaf. Despite its tiny size, the brown leaf chameleon has an imposing appearance due to two pronounced horns that protrude from the head above each eye and four spiny scales that jut from the throat.

== Distribution and habitat ==
The brown leaf chameleon occurs in eastern Madagascar (including the island of Nosy Boraha), from sea level up to elevations of over 1,250 metres (4,100 ft). The floor of evergreen primary forest is the preferred habitat of the brown leaf chameleon, but it may also be found in secondary forest and adjacent overgrown plantations. It seems to prefer closed-canopy forest, and climbs higher in the forest (up to 1.5 m (4.9 ft)), more often than other species of Brookesia.

== Ecology and behavior ==
The brown leaf chameleon spends its days foraging among dead leaves on the forest floor, searching for prey with its independently moving, protruding eyes and catching insects with its long, sticky tongue. If threatened, the lizard's first reaction is to stay still and rely on its remarkable camouflage, but it may also exhibit other defence behaviours. This includes the 'freeze-and-roll' technique, in which the chameleon folds its legs underneath its belly, rolls over to one side and remains very still, mimicking a dead leaf on the forest floor. Alternatively, the brown leaf chameleon may also thrust its spines to ward off predators.

Brown leaf chameleons have an interesting courtship ritual in which a male approaches a female with pronounced nodding and rocking movements. An unreceptive female repels a male by reacting with jerky movements, while a receptive female walks with the male. After some time walking together, and before dusk, the male mounts the female and is carried on her back until the pair copulates in the late evening or at night. This species is known to store sperm. Between 30 and 45 days after copulation, the female lays two to five eggs, which she hides under dead leaves, moss, and pieces of bark on the forest floor. Sometimes, a true nest is excavated and the clutch is laid on to the ground. The eggs hatch after 59 to 70 days; the brown leaf chameleon reaching sexual maturity within one year.

== Threats and conservation ==
Like other Brookesia chameleons, the brown leaf chameleon is threatened primarily by habitat destruction, which is the result of agricultural expansion, timber extraction, and small-scale mining. Harvesting for the international pet trade does occur, but is unlikely to be threatening its survival. Since 2005, export quotas have been set at 200 individuals per year.

The brown leaf chameleon is listed on Appendix II of the Convention on International Trade in Endangered Species (CITES), meaning that trade in this species should be carefully controlled to be compatible with their survival. It is also known to occur in a number of protected areas, including Befotaka-Midongy National Park, Mantadia National Park, Analamazoatra Special Reserve, and Kalambatitra Special Reserve. Although illegal harvesting and other activities that degrade the forest habitat may lessen any benefits this bestows, this species is more tolerant of forest disturbance than other leaf chameleons.
