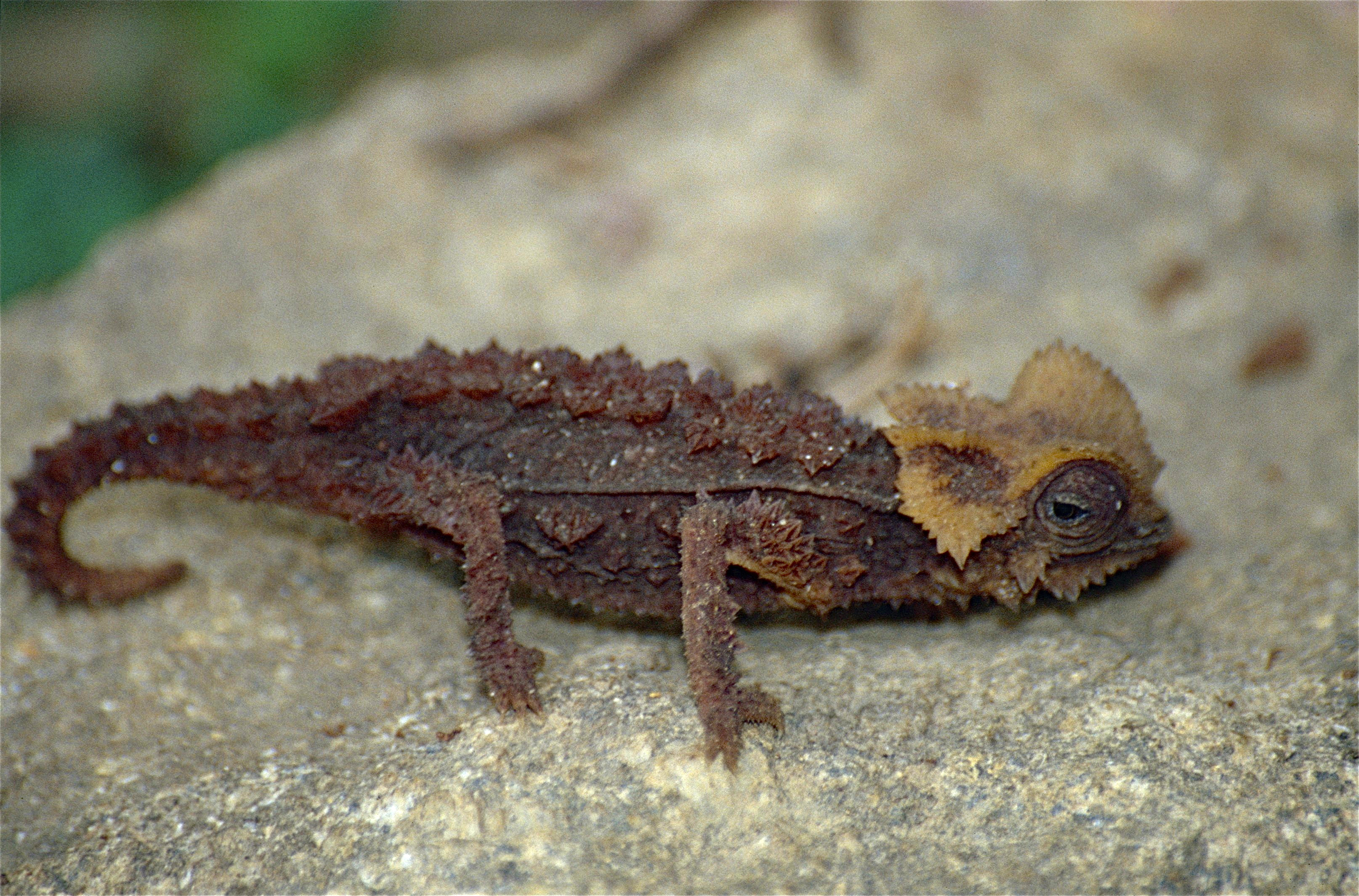

Conservation status
- Endangered (IUCN 3.1)
- CITES Appendix I

Scientific classification
- Kingdom: Animalia
- Phylum: Chordata
- Class: Reptilia
- Order: Squamata
- Suborder: Iguania
- Family: Chamaeleonidae
- Genus: Brookesia
- Species: B. perarmata

Binomial name
- Brookesia perarmata Angel, 1933
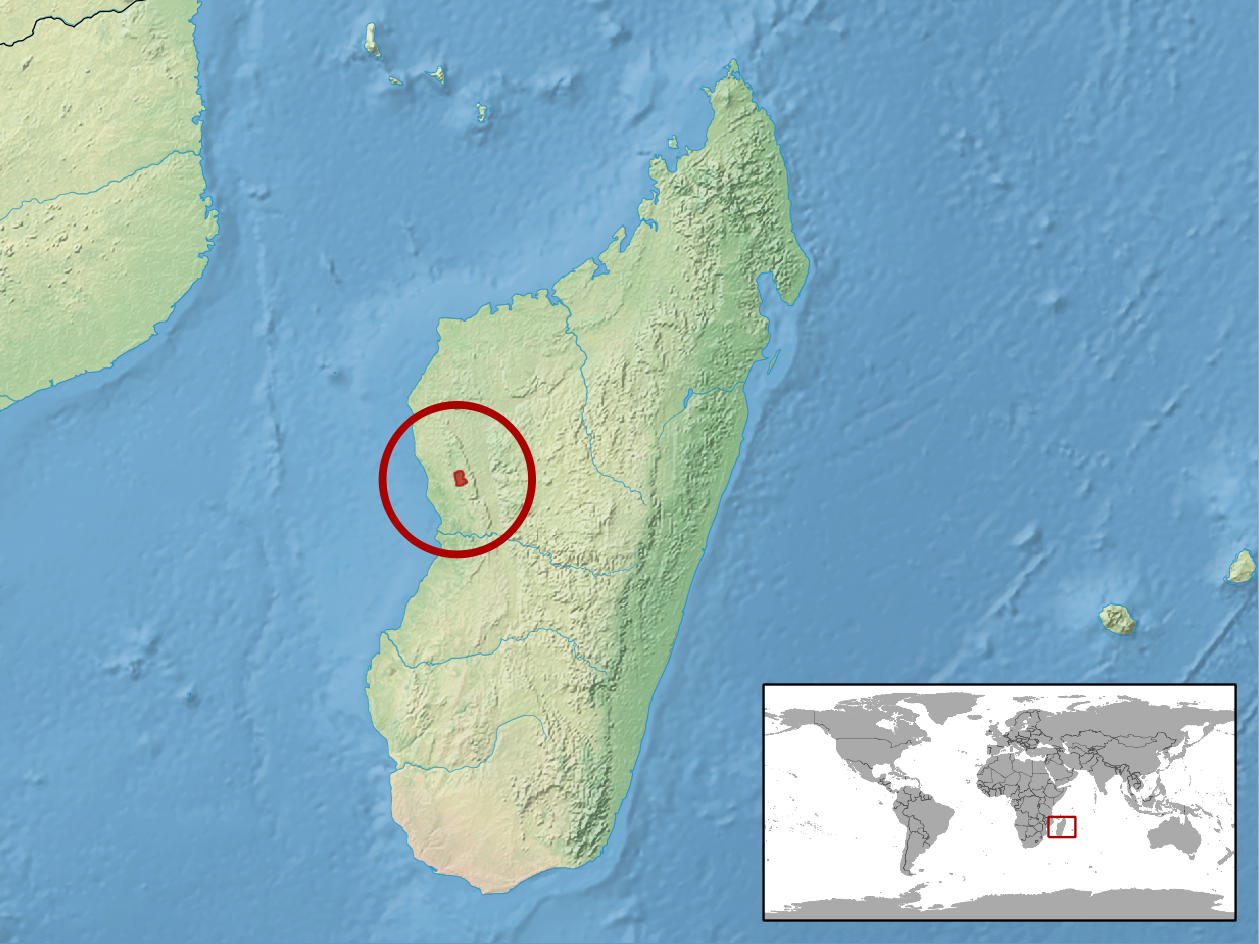

= Antsingy leaf chameleon =

Species of lizard

The Antsingy leaf chameleon (Brookesia perarmata) is a species of lizards in the family Chamaeleonidae. The species is also referred to as Armoured leaf chameleon.

This species is endemic to Madagascar and can only be found in the dry deciduous forests of the northern area of the Tsingy de Bemaraha National Park in Madagascar's Melaky Region. These chameleons were popular pets for a short time leading to a severely decreasing population trend before pet trade of the species was banned. Deforestation and habitat degradation continue to affect their numbers despite conservation efforts within their range.

== Life ==
Although smaller than most chameleons, The Antsingy leaf chameleon is the largest of the Brookesia (dwarf) genus of chameleons which can grow up to eleven centimeters. This chameleon includes a non-prehensile tail that assists them in locomotion within the leaf litter on the forest ground. Distinguished by bilateral rows of thorny spines along the dorsal surface and its brown coloration. Chameleons can change colors, and this chameleon has a dull coloration. It is oviparous.

== Habitat ==
This ornate chameleon species occurs in dry, deciduous forest in Madagascar. This chameleon dwells on the forest floor among the dead leaves which it uses for camouflage and climbs up low plant branches when it's time to sleep. The Antsingy Leaf Chameleon lives amongst leaf litter and requires primary, relatively untouched forest habitat. The species can be found within 100 to 430 meters above sea level in the west part of the park. There may be some in the Réserve Naturelle Intégrale de Bemaraha.

== Threats ==
There are many threats to the Antsingy leaf chameleon's habitat but their decline in population was exacerbated due to collection for pet trade. These intricate leaf chameleons became a popular pet for many lizard enthusiasts in the 1980s and into the 90's and continue to draw attention from herpetoculturist.

== Conservation ==
This species has been listed as Endangered (EN) by International Union for Conservation of Nature since 2011. It was previously listed on the IUCN Redlist in as Vulnerable (VU) in 1996. It is listed in Appendix I of the Convention on International Trade in Endangered Species meaning that commercial international trade is prohibited. International trade for non-commercial reasons is possible with CITES permits.
