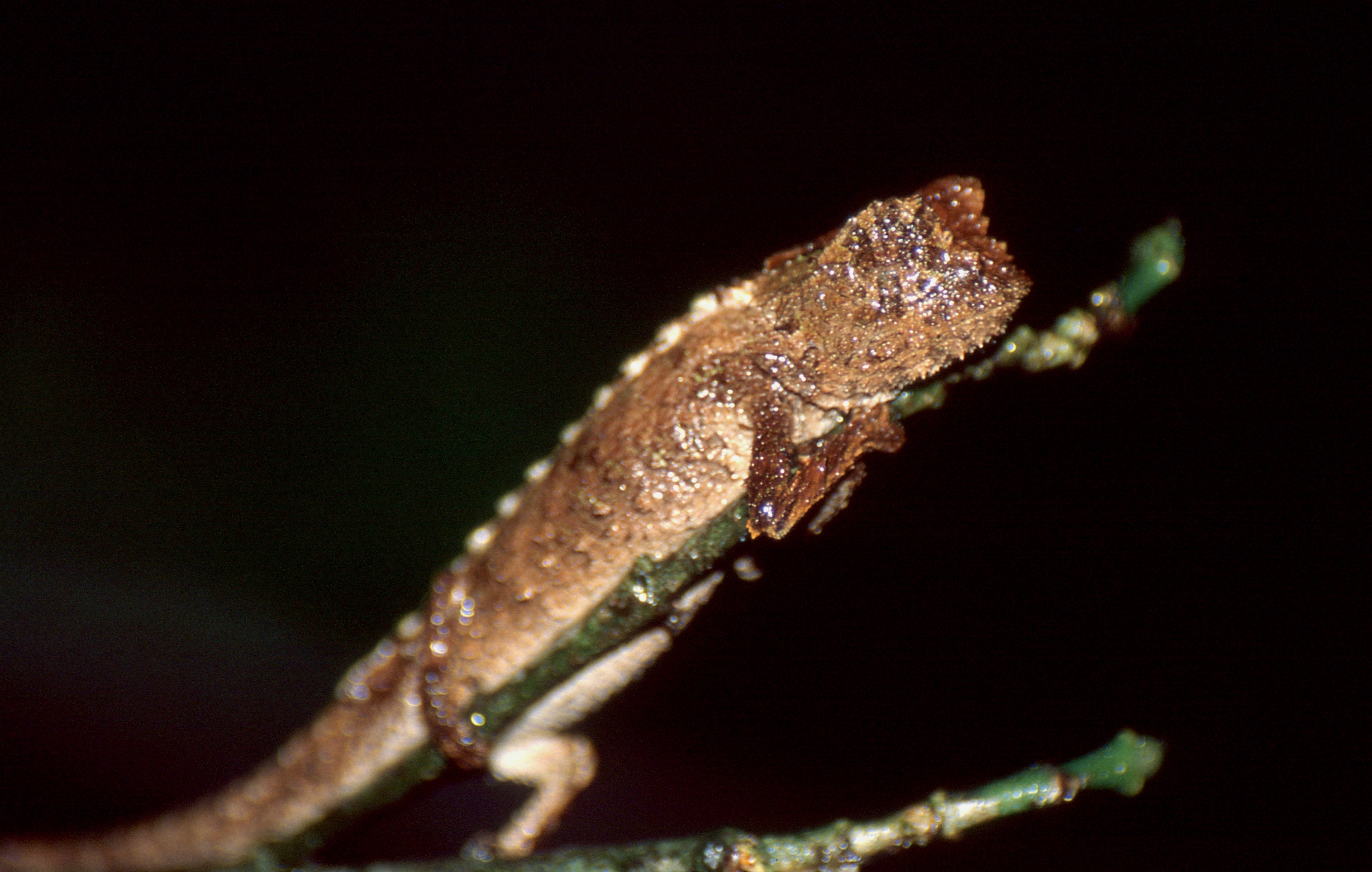

Conservation status
- Vulnerable (IUCN 3.1)

Scientific classification
- Kingdom: Animalia
- Phylum: Chordata
- Class: Reptilia
- Order: Squamata
- Suborder: Iguania
- Family: Chamaeleonidae
- Genus: Brookesia
- Species: B. ebenaui

Binomial name
- Brookesia ebenaui (Boettger, 1880)
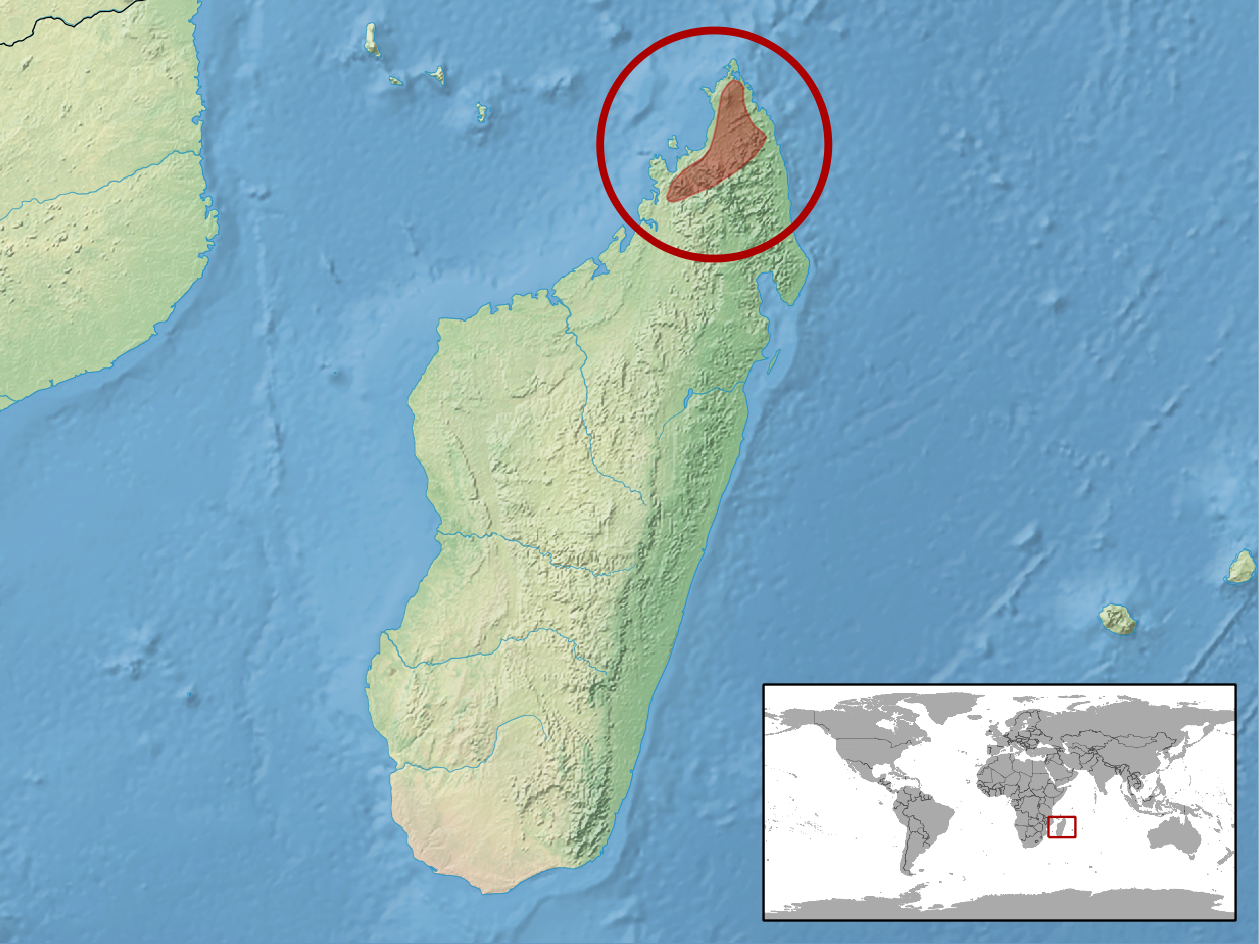

Synonyms
- Chamaeleo ebenaui Boettger, 1880; Brookesia ebenaui — Boulenger, 1887; Brookesia legendrei Ramanantsoa, 1980; Brookesia ebenaui — Glaw & Vences, 1994

= Brookesia ebenaui =

Species of lizard

Brookesia ebenaui (northern leaf chameleon or Ebenau's leaf chameleon) is a chameleon, a lizard in the family Chamaeleonidae. The species, which is endemic to Madagascar, can rapidly change color among various earth hues.

== Etymology ==
The specific name, ebenaui, is in honor of German zoologist Karl Ebenau.

== Geographic range ==
B. ebenaui is found in extreme northern Madagascar.

== Habitat ==
The preferred natural habitat of B. ebenaui is forest, at altitudes from sea level to 800 m (2,600 ft).

== Reproduction ==
B. ebenaui is oviparous.

== Photolinks ==
- Wildherps.com
