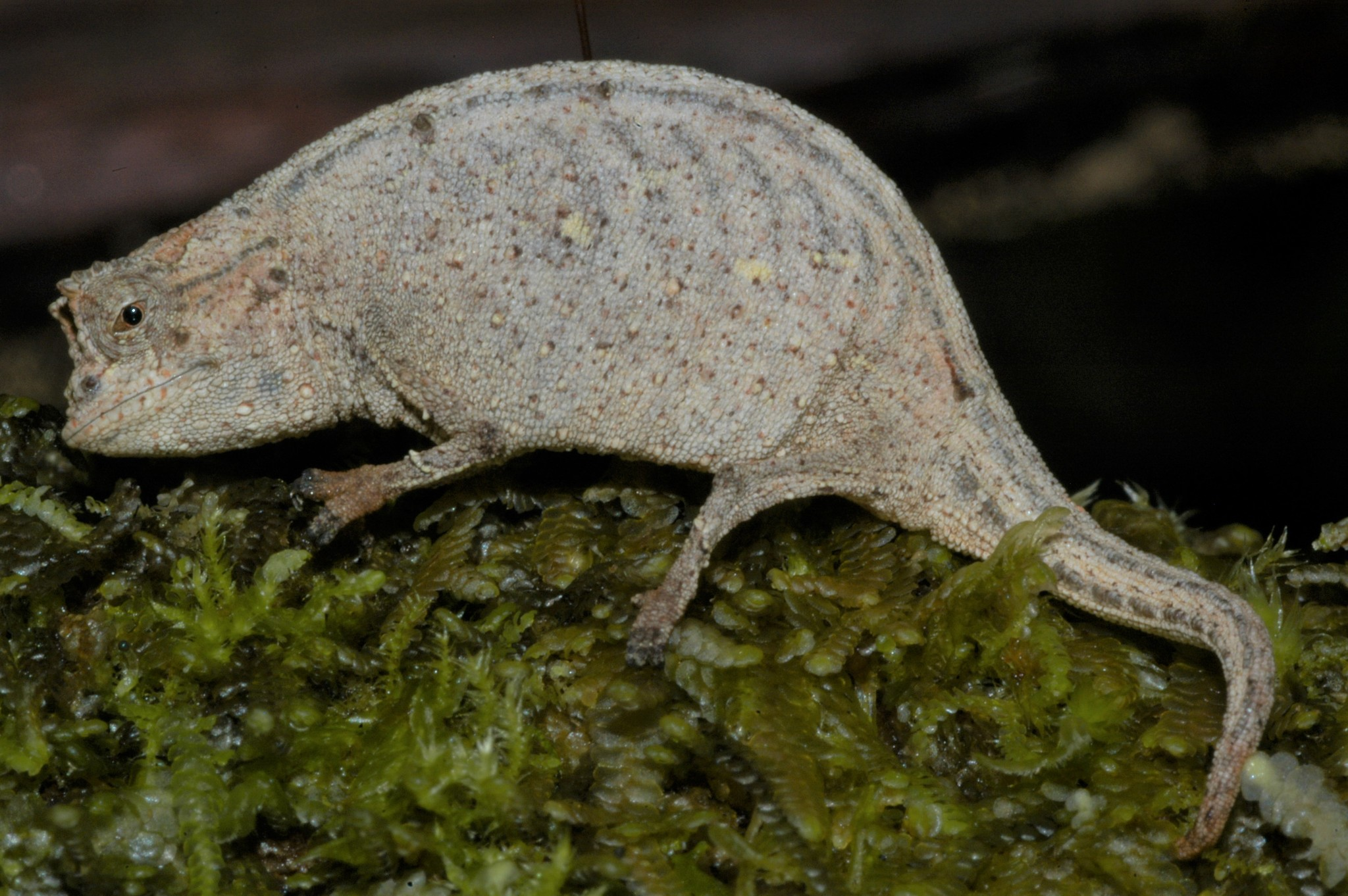

Conservation status
- Endangered (IUCN 3.1)

Scientific classification
- Kingdom: Animalia
- Phylum: Chordata
- Class: Reptilia
- Order: Squamata
- Suborder: Iguania
- Family: Chamaeleonidae
- Genus: Brookesia
- Species: B. ramanantsoai

Binomial name
- Brookesia ramanantsoai Brygoo & Domergue, 1975
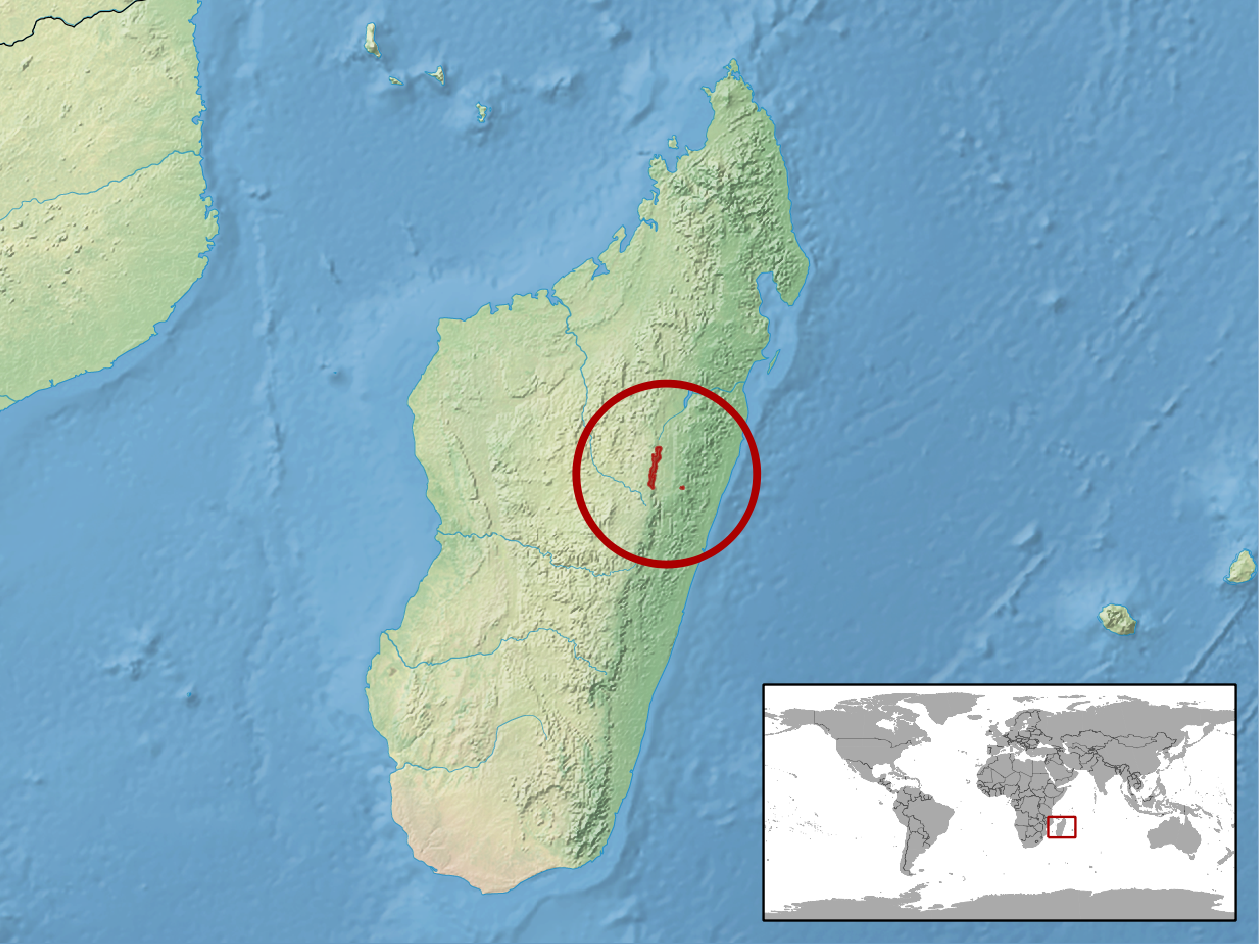

= Brookesia ramanantsoai =

Species of lizard

Brookesia ramanantsoai is a species of chameleon. It is found in Madagascar.
