= Brookesia lambertoni =

Conservation status
- Data Deficient (IUCN 3.1)

Scientific classification
- Kingdom: Animalia
- Phylum: Chordata
- Class: Reptilia
- Order: Squamata
- Suborder: Iguania
- Family: Chamaeleonidae
- Genus: Brookesia
- Species: B. lambertoni

Binomial name
- Brookesia lambertoni Brygoo & Domergue, 1970
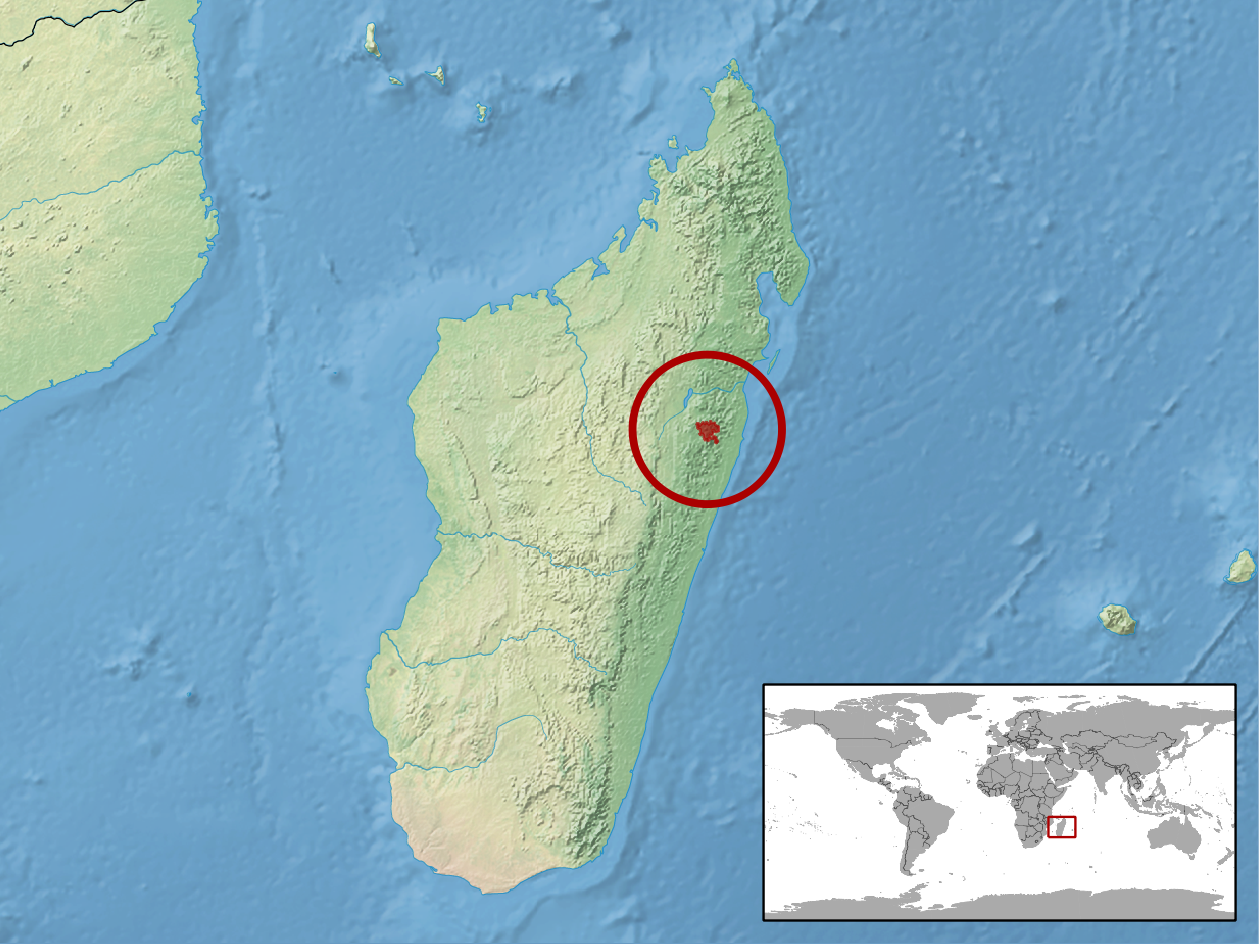

Species of lizard

Brookesia lambertoni, commonly known as the Fito leaf chameleon, is a species of chameleon, a lizard in the family Chamaeleonidae. The species is endemic to Fito in eastern Madagascar. It was first described in 1970 by Édouard-Raoul Brygoo and Charles Antoine Domergue. It is rated as Data Deficient (DD) by the International Union for Conservation of Nature (IUCN), as not enough data on the species have been collected to judge its conservation status.

== Distribution and habitat ==
The Fito leaf chameleon is endemic to Fito, Toamasina, Madagascar, and its type locality is Fito. The species' common name, Fito leaf chameleon, is ambiguous, and does not explain if it is referring to the forest or the administrative area or the town, all of which are named Fito. Recent surveys have not found the species. The area where the species can be found is unknown and any extrapolation is impossible, because only two specimens have been found and recorded. Both specimens were collected before 1921. Its known habitat is in the conservation area Ankeniheny-Zahamena Corridor. It was found in an area affected by the slash-and-burn method of agriculture and logging for building materials, although no threats can be confirmed. Because of this, the International Union for Conservation of Nature listed this species as Data Deficient, as not enough information has been collected to determine its conservation status.

== Taxonomy and etymology ==
This species was initially described by Brygoo and Domergue in 1970 as Brookesia lambertoni, which is still its scientific name, and was named for French paleontologist Charles Lamberton. However, it is more commonly known simply as the Fito leaf chameleon.

== Reproduction ==
B. lambertoni is oviparous.
