= Toothed leaf chameleon =

Conservation status
- Endangered (IUCN 3.1)

Scientific classification
- Kingdom: Animalia
- Phylum: Chordata
- Class: Reptilia
- Order: Squamata
- Suborder: Iguania
- Family: Chamaeleonidae
- Genus: Brookesia
- Species: B. dentata

Binomial name
- Brookesia dentata Mocquard, 1900
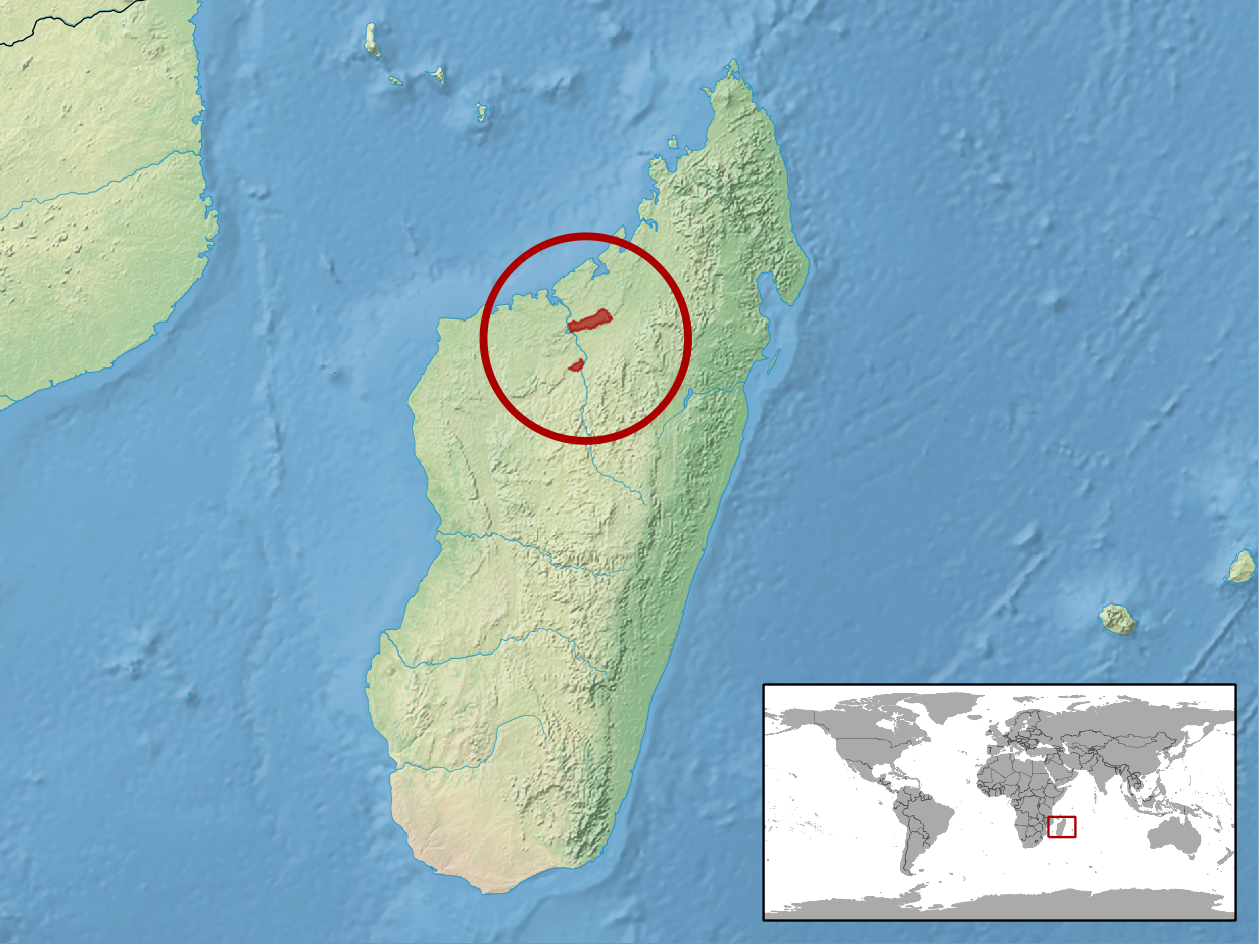

Species of lizard

The toothed leaf chameleon, Brookesia dentata, is a species of chameleons endemic to northwestern Madagascar. It was first described by Mocquard in 1900: 345, and has been described numerous times since then, most recently by Townsend et al. in 2009. It is affected by the collection of charcoal, forest fires, and the grazing of cattle. Its holotype provides from Maevatanana (Suberbieville).

== Distribution and habitat ==
The toothed leaf chameleon is endemic to northwestern Madagascar, and its type locality is Suberbieville (Maevatanana). It has been confirmed to be found at Andasibe, Mandraka, and Angavo-Anjozorobe. At the highest, the species can be found at 200 m (660 ft) above sea level. The International Union for Conservation of Nature has classed B. dentata as an endangered species on their IUCN Red List. It is listed as endangered because it is known only from the Ankarafantsika area, which covers 1,300 km^{2} (500 sq mi), although it could be found over an area of 2,700 km^{2} (1,000 sq mi) at the highest. The habitat of Brookesia dentata is continuing to decline due to charcoal collection, fires, and cattle. The population of Brookesia dentata is currently decreasing like the habitat. It is currently protected under the Madagascar law, and collection of the species is permitted with permission to do so.

== Taxonomy ==
Brookesia dentata was initially described by Mocquard in 1900: 345, and has later been described many times: Werner (1911: 43), Mertens (1966: 2), Brygoo (1978: 25), Glaw and Vences (1994: 235), Klaver and Böhme (1997), Necas (1999: 277), and most recently Townsend et al. (2009). It is commonly known as the toothed leaf chameleon.
