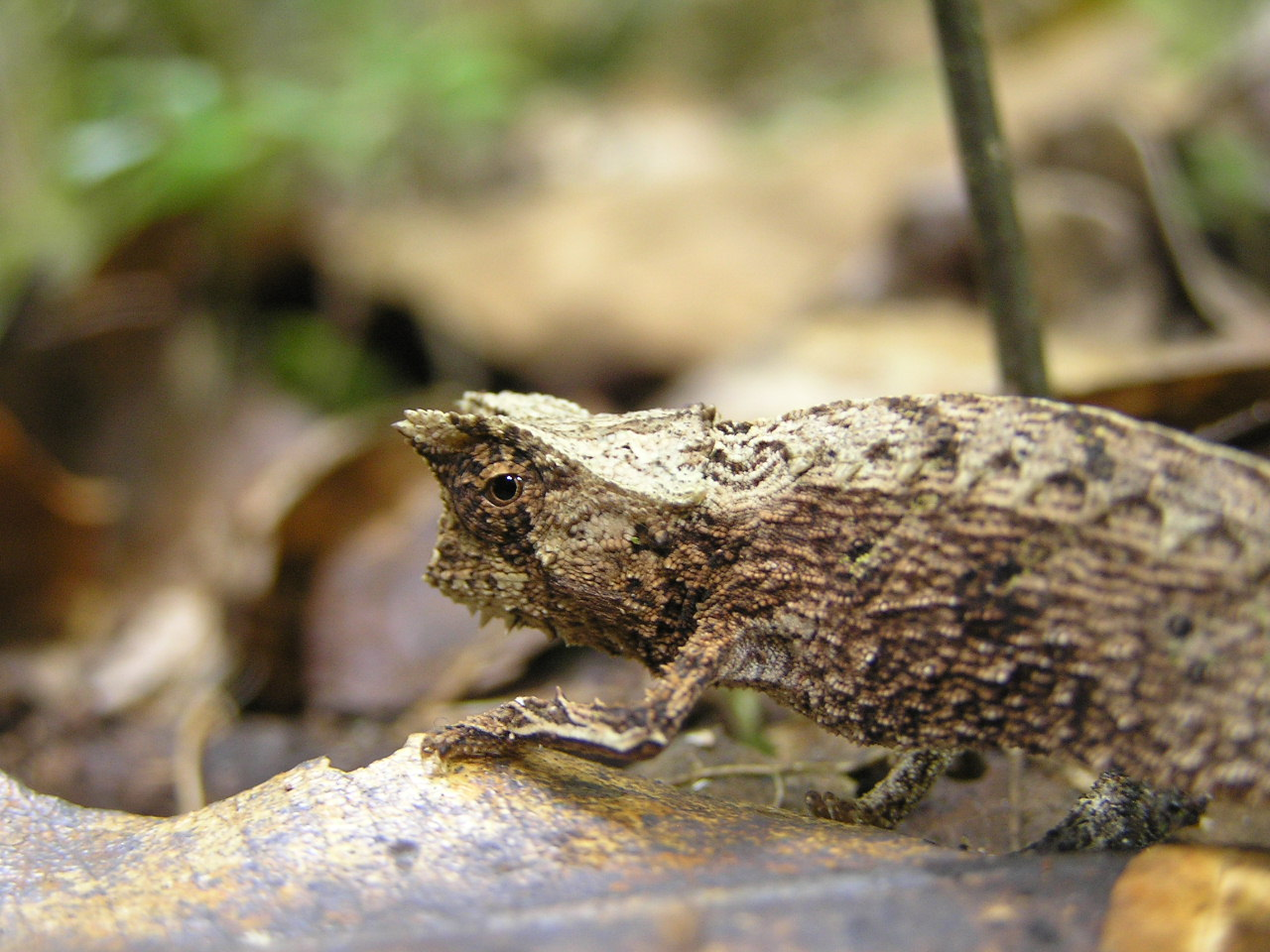

Scientific classification
- Kingdom: Animalia
- Phylum: Chordata
- Class: Reptilia
- Order: Squamata
- Suborder: Iguania
- Family: Chamaeleonidae
- Subfamily: Brookesiinae
- Genus: Brookesia; Gray, 1864

Type species
- Chamaeleo superciliaris Kuhl, 1820

Diversity
- 32 species

= Brookesia =

Genus of lizards

Brookesia is a genus of chameleons, lizards in the family Chamaeleonidae. The genus is endemic to Madagascar. Member species range from small to very small in size, and are known collectively as leaf chameleons (though this common name is also used for species in the genera Rieppeleon and Rhampholeon). Brookesia includes species considered to be the world's smallest chameleons, and are also among the smallest reptiles. Members of the genus Brookesia are largely brown, and most are essentially terrestrial.

A significant percentage of the species in the genus were only identified to science within the last three decades, and a number of species that still have not received a scientific name are known to exist. Most inhabit very small ranges in areas that are difficult to access, and due to their small size and secretive nature, they have been relatively poorly studied compared to their larger relatives.

Brookesia are abundant in low-disturbance riparian zones and low-disturbance rainforests. Brookesia are scarce in high-disturbance forests recovering from burning. As of 2024, Brookesia nofy is the most recently described new species in the subfamily Brookesiinae. A different species, B. nana, is the first chameleon known not to change colors.

== Etymology ==
The generic name Brookesia is in honor of British naturalist Joshua Brookes.

== Conservation status ==
Most Brookesia are on CITES Appendix II, the only exception being B. perarmata on Appendix I (a species also listed as endangered and a newly discovered Brookesia nana listed as Critically Endangered by IUCN). Consequently, a special permit is required to import any of the below species from their native Madagascar, and typically no permit is issued for B. perarmata.

== Species ==
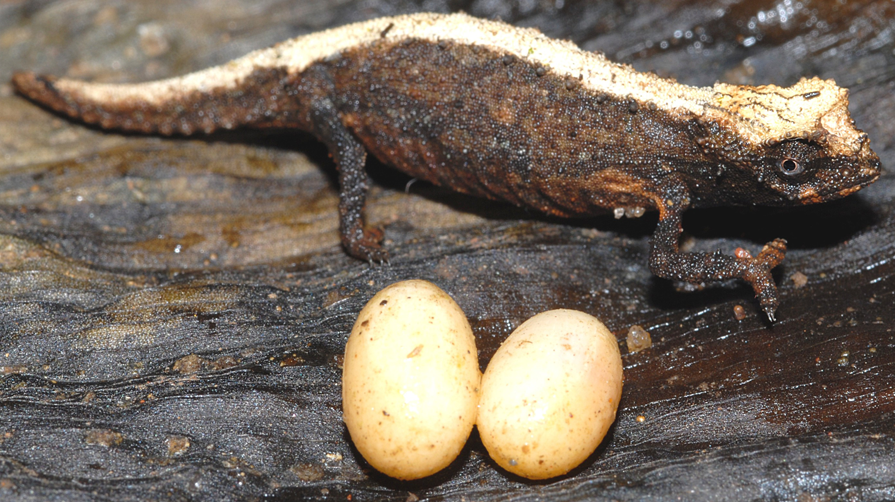
Brookesia desperata female, stress-coloured, with two recently laid eggs.

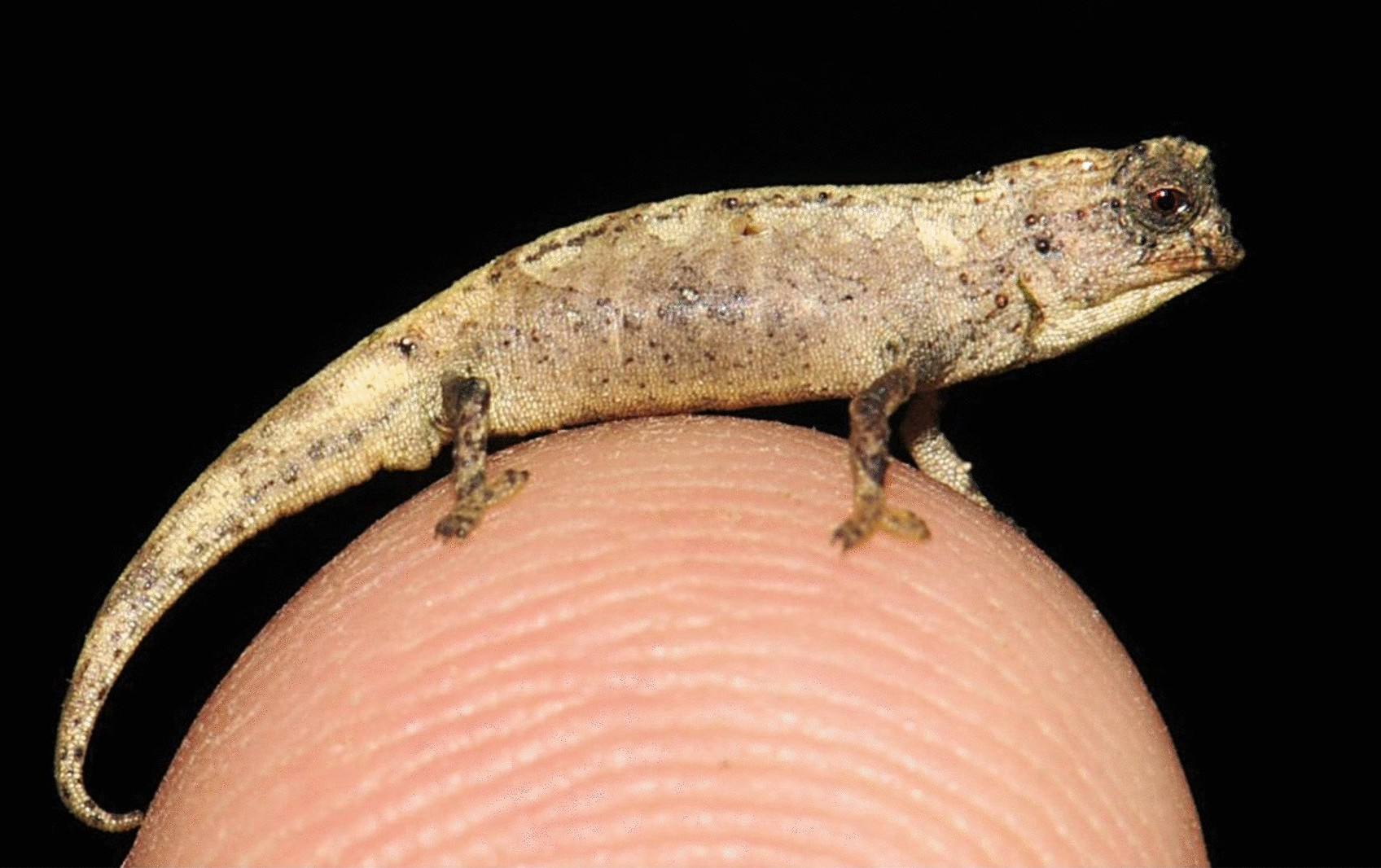
Brookesia nana (male), the world's smallest known reptile species

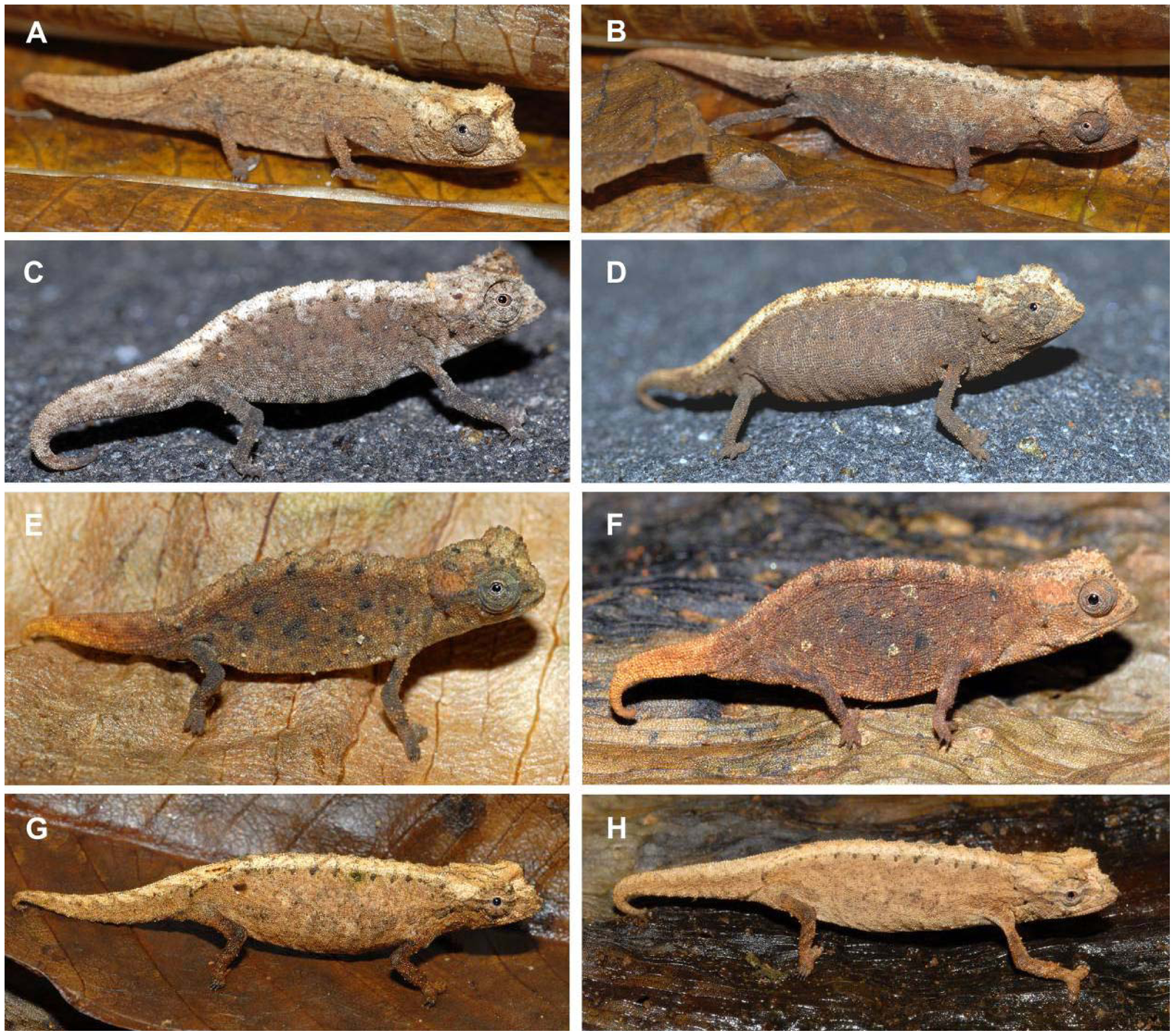
Males (left) and females (right) of four Brookesia species described in 2012, all belonging to the B. minima species group: A-B B. tristis, C-D B. confidens, E-F B. micra, G-H B. desperata

The genus Brookesia contains the following 32 species which are recognized as being valid.

- Brookesia antakarana – Antakarana Leaf Chameleon Raxworthy & Nussbaum, 1995
- Brookesia bekolosy – Bekolosy Leaf Chameleon Raxworthy & Nussbaum, 1995
- Brookesia betschi – Blank's Leaf Chameleon Brygoo, Blanc & Domergue, 1974
- Brookesia bonsi – Namoroka Leaf Chameleon Ramanantsoa, 1980
- Brookesia brunoi – Anja Reserve Leaf Chameleon Crottini et al., 2012
- Brookesia brygooi Raxworthy & Nussbaum, 1995 – leaf chameleon or Brygoo's chameleon
- Brookesia confidens Glaw et al., 2012
- Brookesia decaryi Angel, 1939 – spiny leaf chameleon
- Brookesia dentata Mocquard, 1900 – toothed leaf chameleon
- Brookesia desperata Glaw et al., 2012
- Brookesia ebenaui (Boettger, 1880) – northern leaf chameleon
- Brookesia exarmata Schimmenti & Jesu, 1996
- Brookesia griveaudi Brygoo, Blanc & Domergue, 1974 – Marojejy leaf chameleon
- Brookesia karchei Brygoo, Blanc & Domergue, 1970 – naturelle leaf chameleon
- Brookesia lambertoni Brygoo & Domergue, 1970 – Fito leaf chameleon
- Brookesia lineata Raxworthy & Nussbaum, 1995
- Brookesia micra Glaw et al., 2012
- Brookesia minima Boettger, 1893 – minute leaf chameleon
- Brookesia nana Glaw et al., 2021 – Nano-chameleon
- Brookesia nofy Rakotoarison et al., 2024
- Brookesia perarmata (Angel, 1933) – Antsingy leaf chameleon
- Brookesia peyrierasi Brygoo & Domergue, 1974 – Peyrieras's leaf chameleon
- Brookesia ramanantsoai Brygoo & Domergue, 1975 – Ramanantsoa's minute leaf chameleon
- Brookesia stumpffi Boettger, 1894 – plated leaf chameleon
- Brookesia superciliaris (Kuhl, 1820) – brown leaf chameleon
- Brookesia tedi Scherz, J. Kohler, Rakotoarison, Glaw & Vences, 2019
- Brookesia therezieni Brygoo & Domergue, 1970 – Perinet leaf chameleon
- Brookesia thieli Brygoo & Domergue, 1969 – Domergue's leaf chameleon
- Brookesia tristis Glaw et al., 2012
- Brookesia tuberculata Mocquard, 1894 – Mount d'Ambre leaf chameleon
- Brookesia vadoni Brygoo & Domergue, 1968 – Iaraka River leaf chameleon, mossy pygmy leaf chameleon
- Brookesia valerieae Raxworthy, 1991 – Raxworthy's leaf chameleon

Nota bene: A binomial authority in parentheses indicates that the species was originally described in a genus other than Brookesia.

== See also ==
- Island dwarfism
