= Brookesia bonsi =

Conservation status
- Critically Endangered (IUCN 3.1)

Scientific classification
- Kingdom: Animalia
- Phylum: Chordata
- Class: Reptilia
- Order: Squamata
- Suborder: Iguania
- Family: Chamaeleonidae
- Genus: Brookesia
- Species: B. bonsi

Binomial name
- Brookesia bonsi Ramanantsoa, 1980
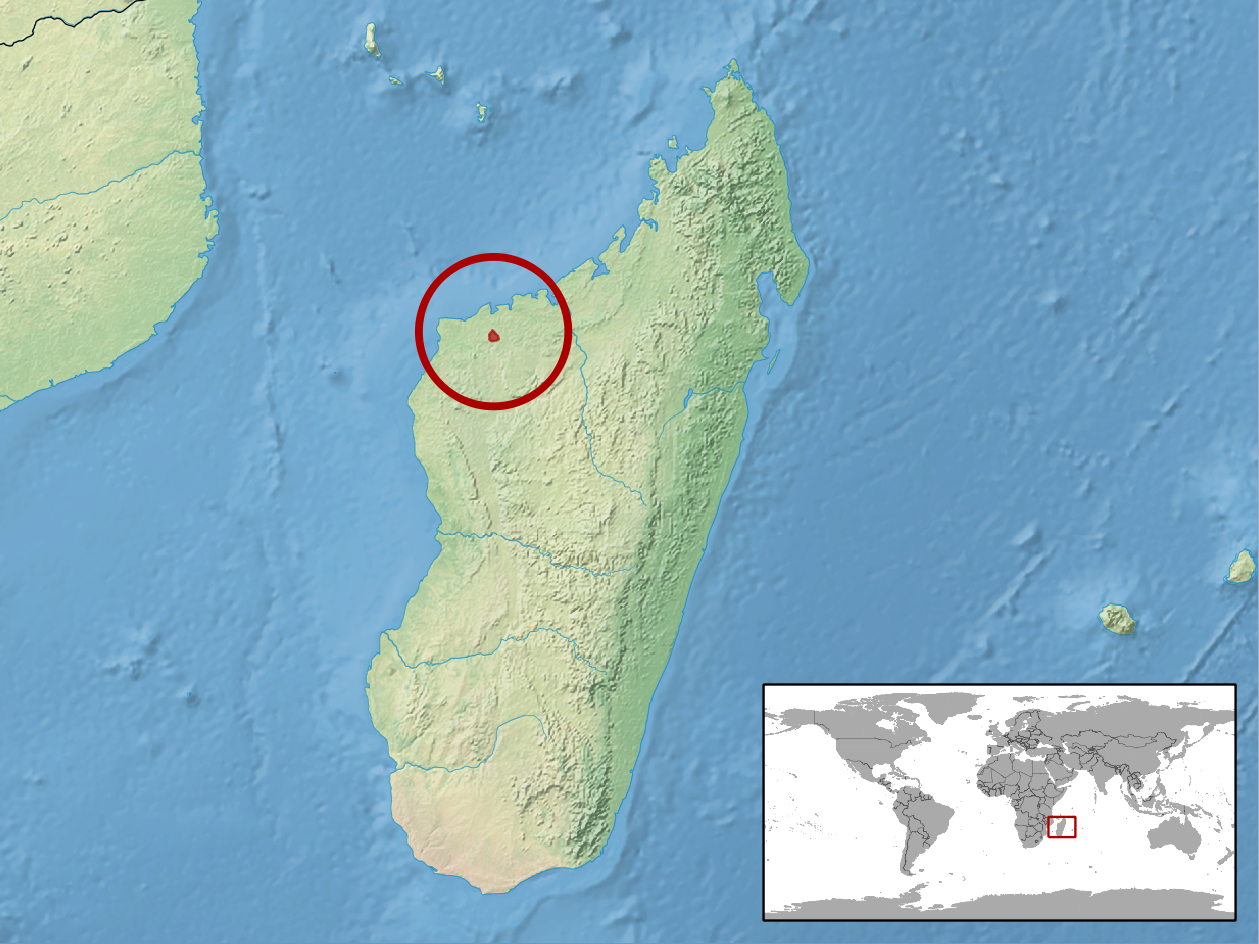

Species of lizard

Brookesia bonsi is a species of chameleons, a lizard in the family Chamaeleonidae. The species is endemic to Madagascar, and was initially described by Guy A. Ramanantsoa in 1980. The International Union for Conservation of Nature ranked this species as Critically Endangered.

== Etymology ==
The specific name, bonsi, is in honor of French herpetologist Jacques Bons (born 1933).

== Distribution and habitat ==
Brookesia bonsi is endemic to Namoroka National Park in Soalala District, Mahajanga Province, northern Madagascar. Its type locality is the Tsingy de Namoroka Strict Nature Reserve. It is found on and restricted to the more humid parts of the reserve. B. bonsi was found at elevations between 100 and 200 m (330 and 660 ft) above mean sea level. It is believed to be found over an area less than 100 km^{2} (39 sq mi), and many surveys in western Madagascar have failed to record this species.

== Reproduction ==
B. bonsi is oviparous.

== Conservation status ==
Because of the small area in which it is found, the International Union for Conservation of Nature has ranked B. bonsi as Critically Endangered because the habitat continues to decline due to agriculture and the collection of wood. During a 1996 survey, the species was not considered rare, but during 2002, the species was not found on a 15-day survey of the nature reserve.

== Taxonomy ==
Brookesia bonsi was originally described as a species new to science by herpetologist Guy A. Ramanantsoa in 1980. Authors who later published on this species were: Glaw and Vences (1994: 236), Nečas (1999: 276), and most recently Townsend et al. (2009). According to the Integrated Taxonomic Information System (ITIS), the taxonomic status of this species is valid.
