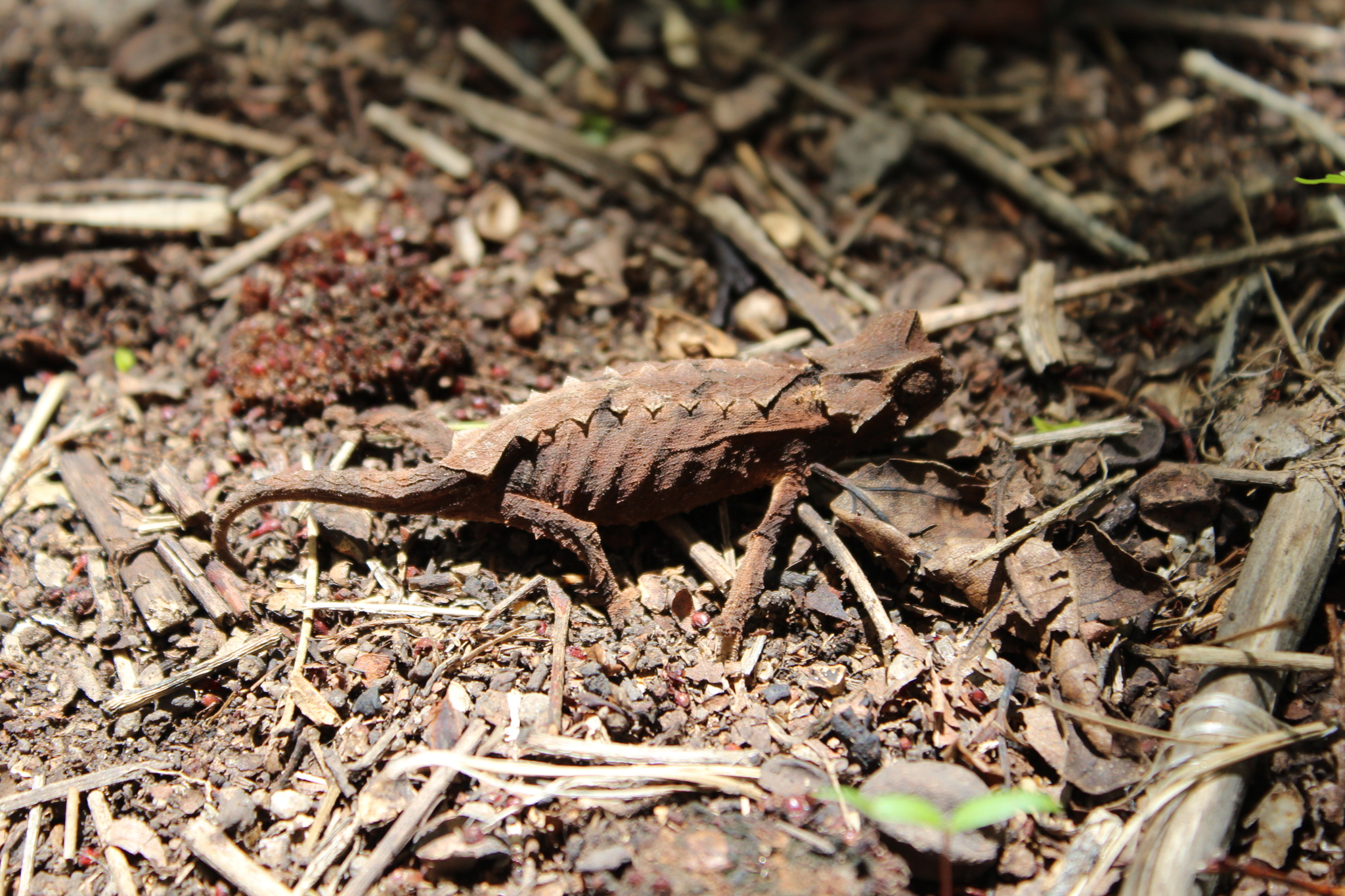

Conservation status
- Near Threatened (IUCN 3.1)

Scientific classification
- Kingdom: Animalia
- Phylum: Chordata
- Class: Reptilia
- Order: Squamata
- Suborder: Iguania
- Family: Chamaeleonidae
- Genus: Brookesia
- Species: B. brunoi

Binomial name
- Brookesia brunoi Crottini, Miralles, Glaw, Harris, Lima, & Vences, 2012
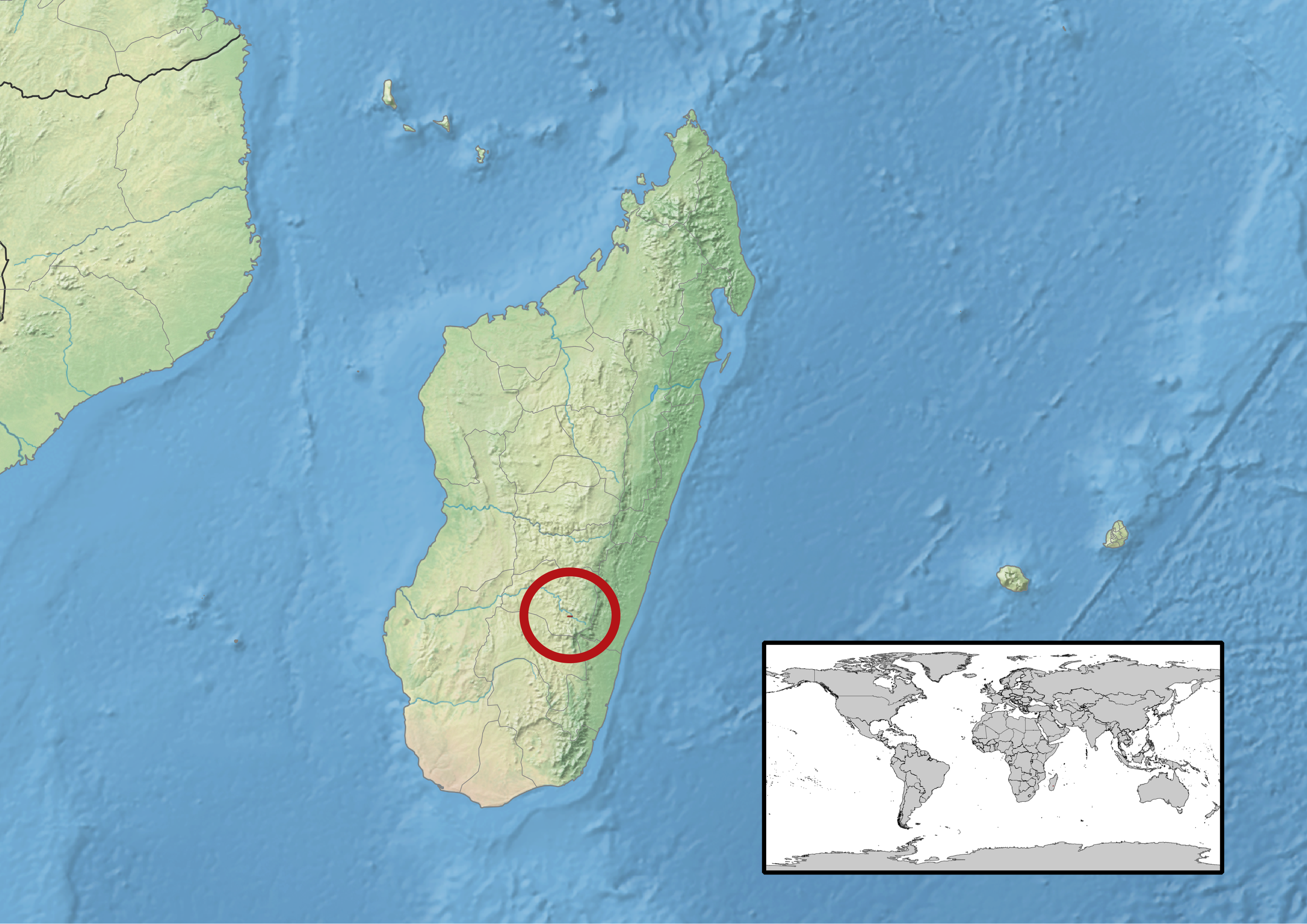

= Brookesia brunoi =

Species of lizard

Brookesia brunoi is a species of chameleon. It is found in Madagascar. Brookesia brunoi belongs to the Brookesia decaryi group. Brookesia brunoi, uniquely, does not have enlarged pointed tubercles around the vent.
