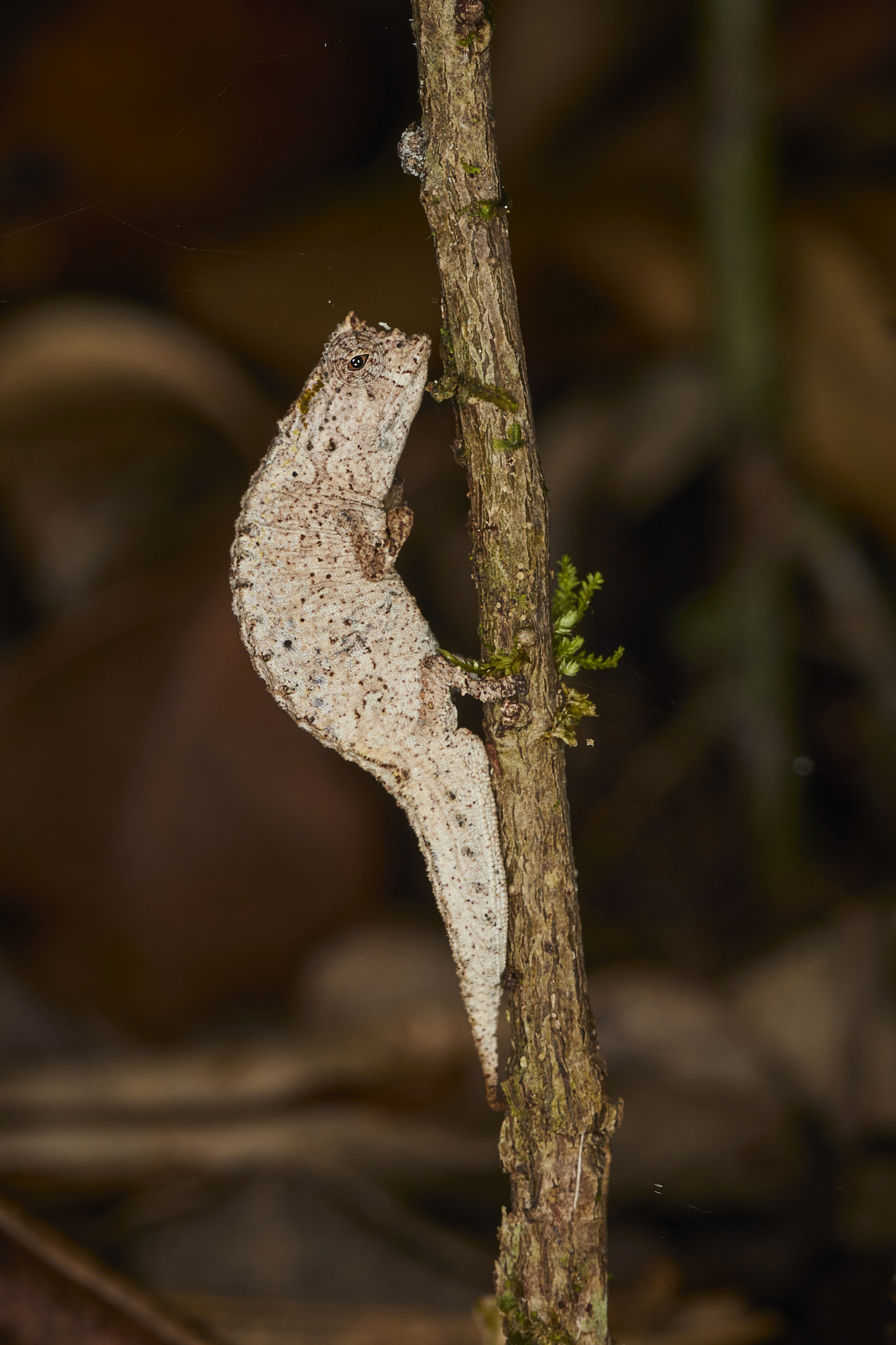

Scientific classification
- Kingdom: Animalia
- Phylum: Chordata
- Class: Reptilia
- Order: Squamata
- Suborder: Iguania
- Family: Chamaeleonidae
- Genus: Brookesia
- Species: B. nofy

Binomial name
- Brookesia nofy Rakotoarison et al., 2024

= Brookesia nofy =

Species of lizard

Brookesia nofy is a species of tiny chameleon, a lizard in the genus Brookesia. The species is found in Ankanin’ny Nofy, Madagascar. B. nofy can grow up to 33 millimetres (1.3 in) in length, making it one of the world's smallest reptiles. This species, like others in the Brookesia genus, is known for its small size and cryptic coloration.

== Gallery ==
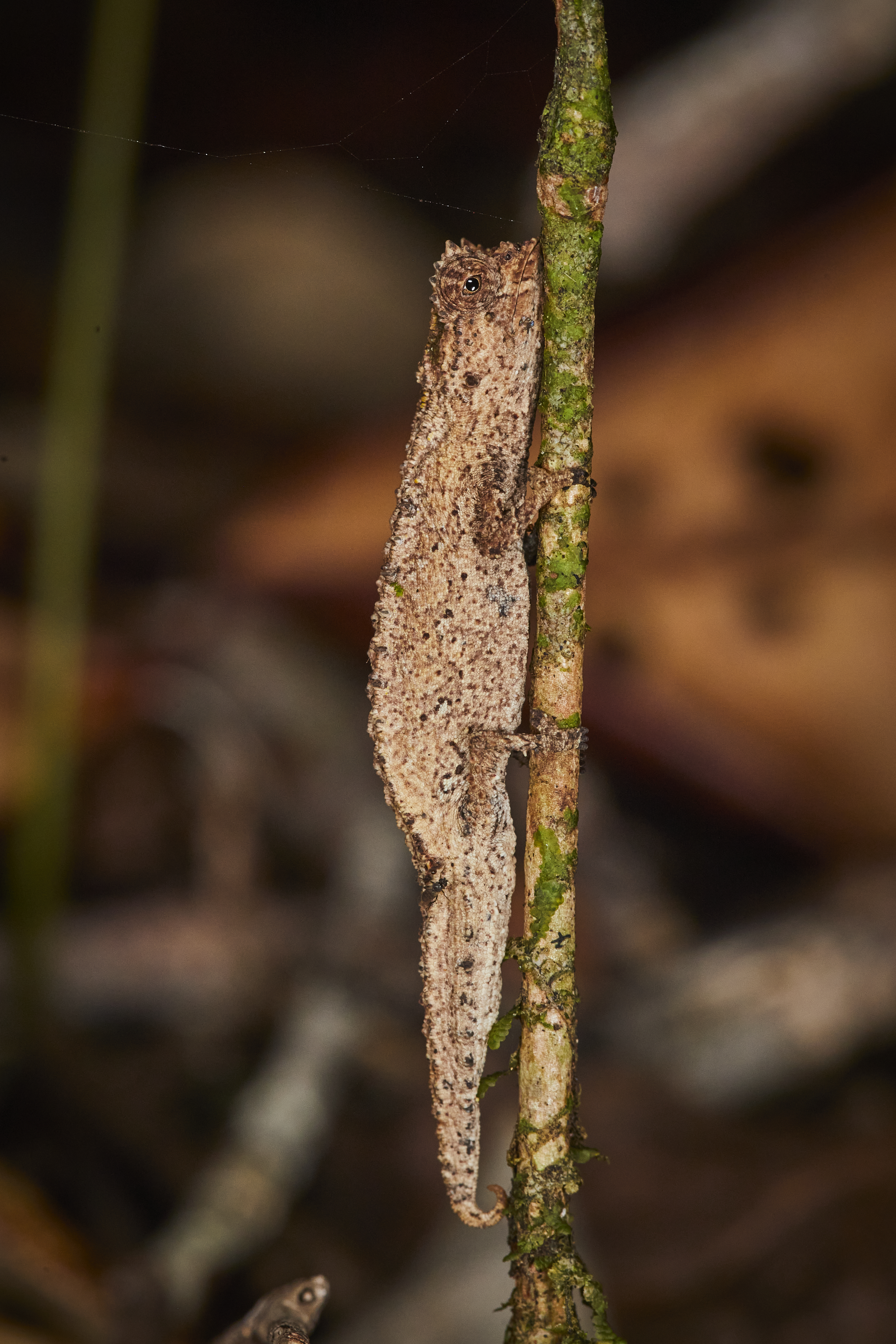

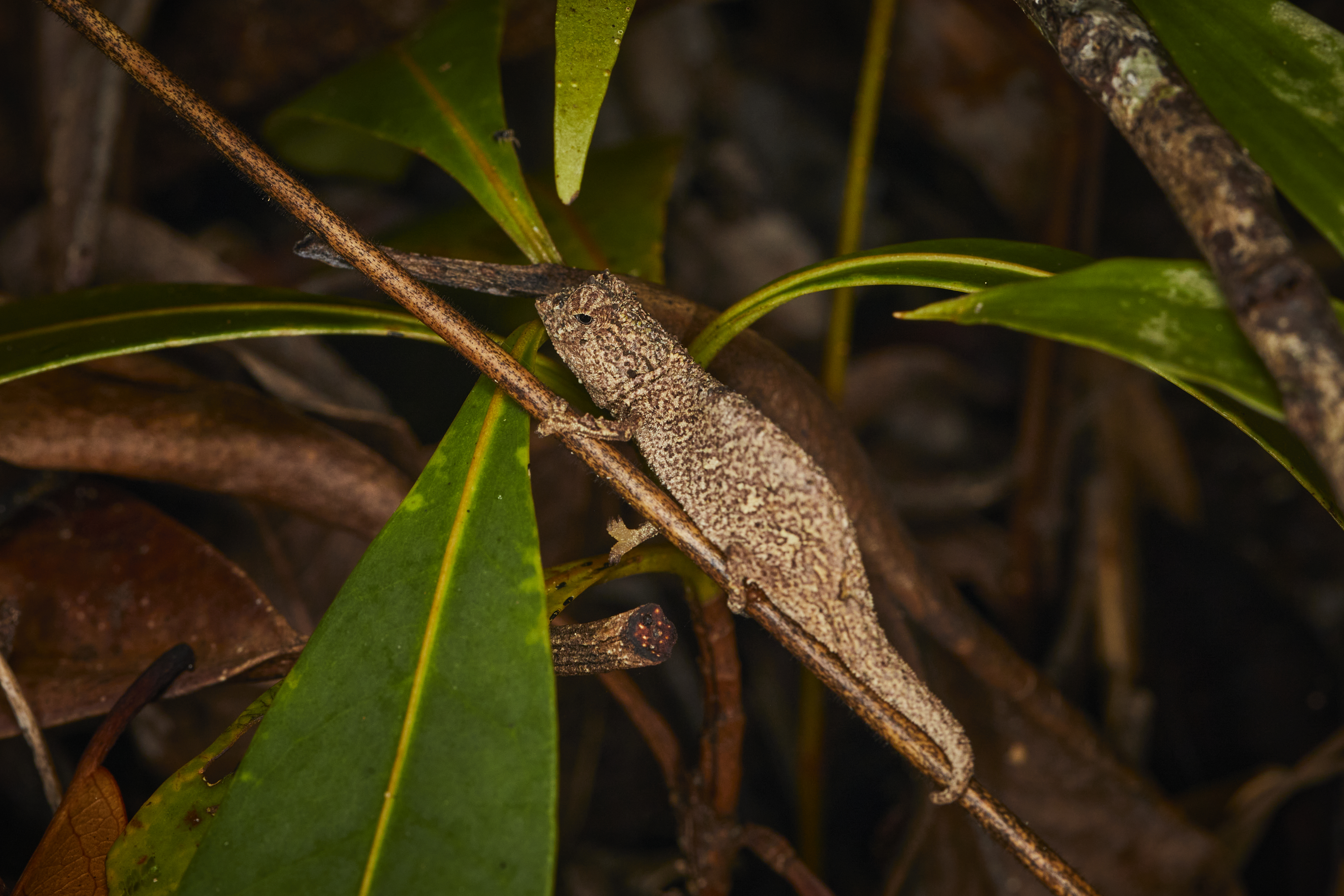
