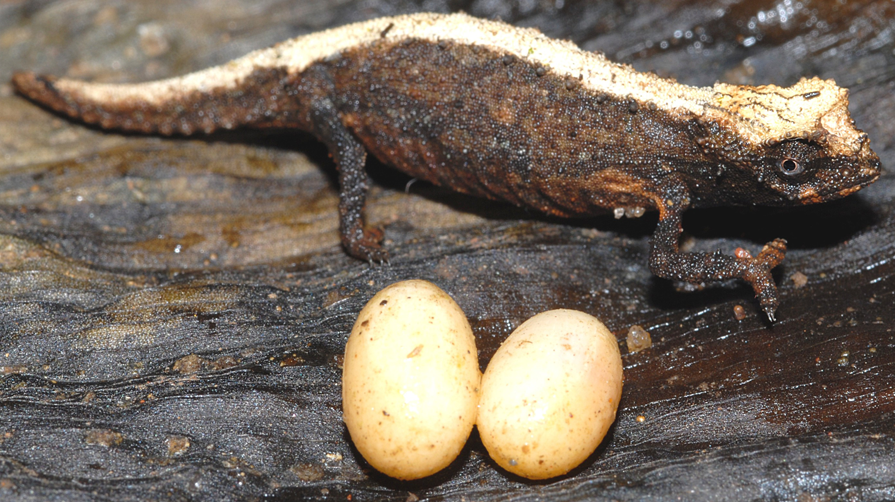
- A stress-coloured female with a fresh clutch of two eggs

Conservation status
- Critically Endangered (IUCN 3.1)
- CITES Appendix II

Scientific classification
- Kingdom: Animalia
- Phylum: Chordata
- Class: Reptilia
- Order: Squamata
- Suborder: Iguania
- Family: Chamaeleonidae
- Genus: Brookesia
- Species: B. desperata

Binomial name
- Brookesia desperata Glaw, Köhler, Townsend, & Vences, 2012
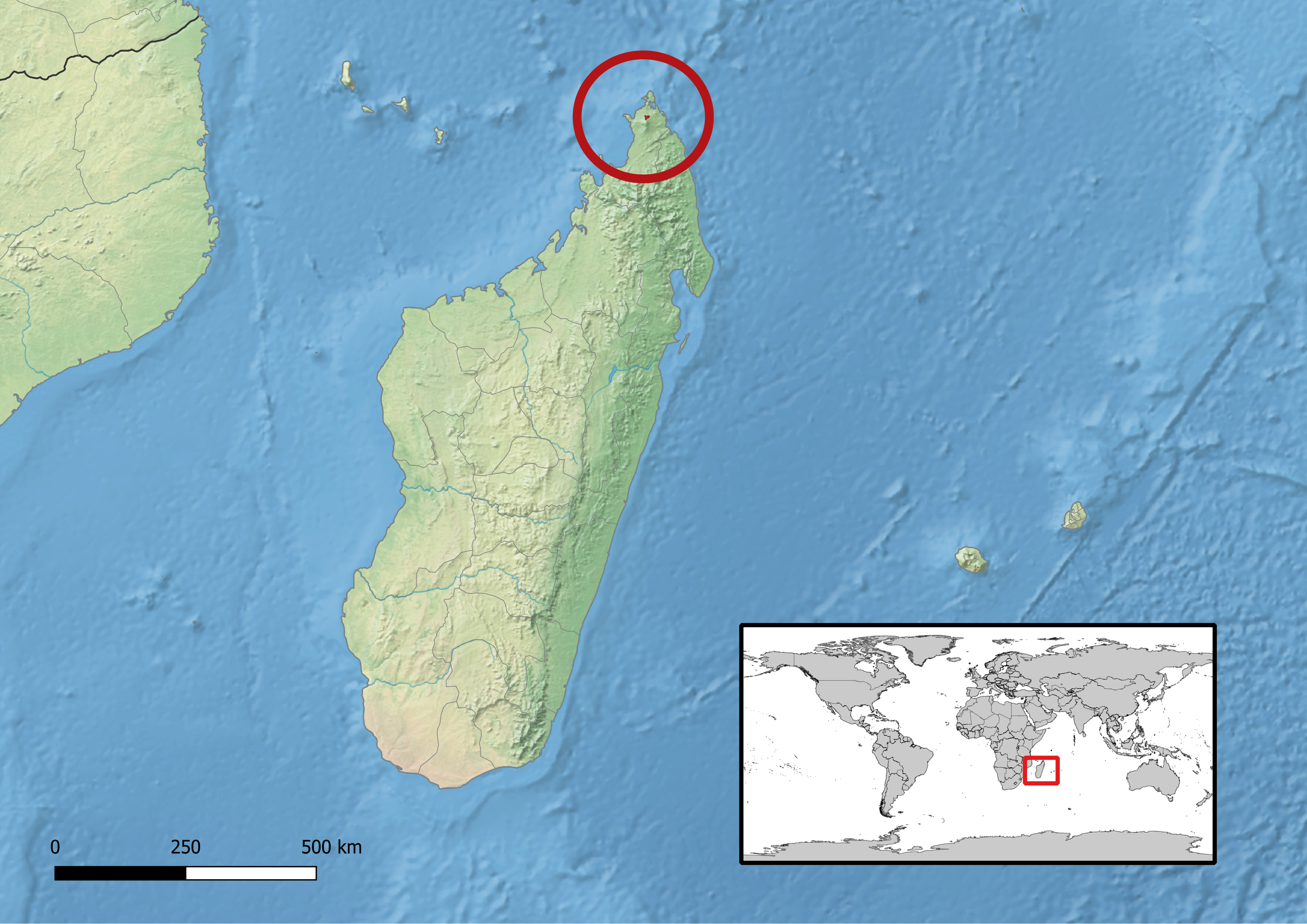

= Brookesia desperata =

Species of lizard

Brookesia desperata is a species of chameleons. It is endemic to Foret d'Ambre Special Reserve in north Madagascar, and is a critically endangered species due to the decline of its habitat. This decline is attributed to clearance of forest for crops, charcoal production, timber extraction, small-scale quarrying and cattle grazing. It was named desperata to provoke thought regarding the desperately threatened habitat of Madagascar's micro-endemic species. They can be found roosting above ground on small branches or leaves 5–100 cm above ground at night. B. desperata was described in 2012 by a research team led by Dr. Frank Glaw from the Zoologische Staatssammlung München.
