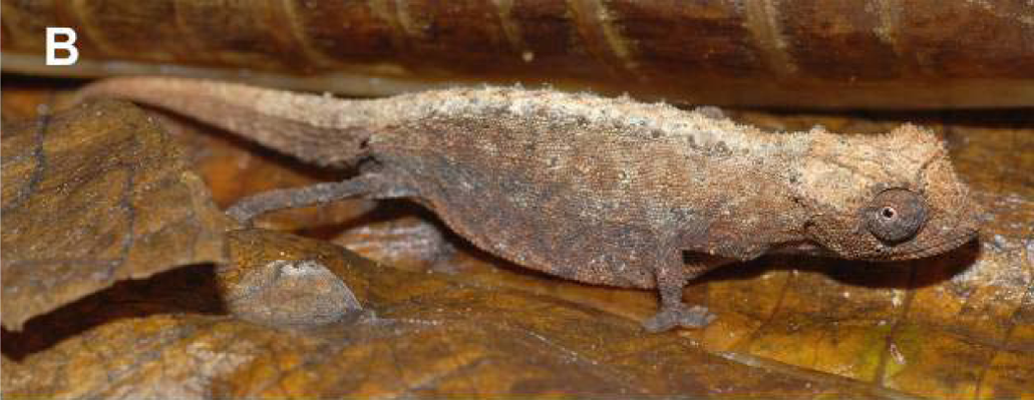

Conservation status
- Endangered (IUCN 3.1)

Scientific classification
- Kingdom: Animalia
- Phylum: Chordata
- Class: Reptilia
- Order: Squamata
- Suborder: Iguania
- Family: Chamaeleonidae
- Genus: Brookesia
- Species: B. tristis

Binomial name
- Brookesia tristis Glaw, Köhler, Townsend & Vences, 2012
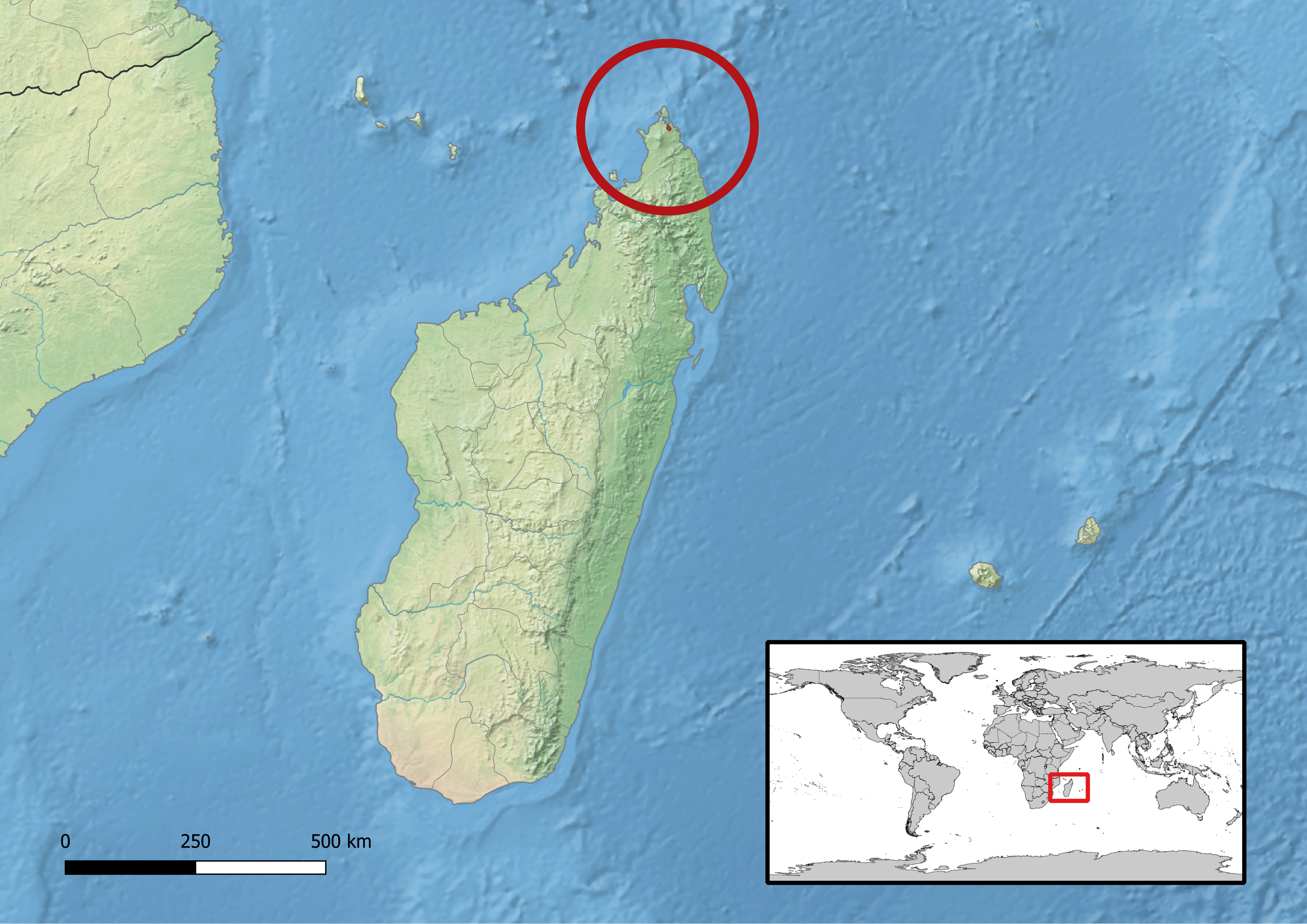

= Brookesia tristis =

Species of lizard

Brookesia tristis is a species of chameleons. It is endemic to Montagne des Français, Madagascar, and is an endangered species due to the decline of its habitat. It was named after the French word "triste" meaning sad to provoke thought regarding the threatened habitat of Madagascar's micro-endemic species. B. Triste was first found in an isolated patch of forest near an expanding city in 2012 by a research team led by Dr. Frank Glaw from the Zoologische Staatssammlung München.
