= Manongarivo Special Reserve =

Wildlife reserve in Madagascar

- IUCN category IV (habitat/species management area)
- Location within Madagascar
- Location: Northern western Madagascar
- Nearest city: Ambanja
- Coordinates: 14°00′S 48°20′E
- Area: 643.56 km^{2} (248.48 sq mi)
- Established: 1956
- Governing body: Parcs Nationaux Madagascar – ANGAP

Manongarivo Reserve is a wildlife reserve in the North-West of Madagascar in the region of Diana.

Manongarivo is home to both the Sambirano mouse lemur and the Sambirano woolly lemur.

== Geography ==
The reserve has a surface of 64,356 ha and is situated at 35 km from Ambanja. It has an elevation of 1013 metres.

== Flora and fauna ==
The vegetation is composed of low- and mid-altitude dense humid forest. Low-altitude, dry-transitional forest covers 18% of the reserve, and is dominated by trees of Canarium, Symphonia (and other species of Clusiaceae), Terminalia, Cryptocarya and species of Sapotaceae, with smaller trees such as Phyllarthron in the subcanopy. There are about sixty species of birds in the reserve, thirty of which are endemic to Madagascar.

Some of the species found in the reserve are:

=== Fauna ===
- Eulemur macaco
- Microcebus sambiranensis
- Philepitta castanea
- Ploceus sakalava

=== Bryophytes ===
- Bazzania descrescens
- Diplasiolejeunea cobrensis
- Drepanolejeunea geisslerae
- Microlejeunea fissistipula
- Lopholejeunea leioptera
- Plagiochila fracta
- Schistochila piligera
- Leucobryum parvulum
- Leucobryum sanctae-mariae
- Ochrobryum sakalavu
- Syrrhopodon cuneifolius
