= André Peyriéras =

Dr André Peyriéras (December 11, 1927, in Saint Moreil (Le Monthioux), France – December 24, 2018, in Limoges, France) received his doctorate from the University of Montpellier in France. He settled in Madagascar in 1954 and lived there until 2005. He became one of Madagascar's most eminent entomologists, herpetologists and plant collectors.

He discovered over 3,000 new insects. Peyriéras's dwarf chameleon (Brookesia peyrierasi), Peyriéras's chameleon (Calumma peyrierasi), and Peyriéras's woolly lemur (Avahi peyrierasi) are all named after him. He discovered a new Brookesia species, Brookesia vadoni, in 1968, prospecting for insects in Iaraka, in the Masoala massif, that was described by É.-R. Brygoo and C.A. Domergue from the Institut Pasteur de Tananarive.

Peyriéras founded and ran the Mandraka Nature Farm, now known as Peyriéras Reserve Madagascar Exotic, about 75 km (47 mi) east of Antananarivo in Madagascar. Here they breed many of Madagascar's' rare and endangered reptiles, frogs and insects. The farm is now run by his daughter, Sylviane Peyriéras.

== Publications ==
In French:

- Contribution à l'étude des Scaritinae de Madagascar (thesis)
- Faune de Madagascar: Issue 41, Insectes Coléoptères Carabidae Scaritinae, part II: Biologie
- Faune de Madagascar: Issue 57, Insectes Coléoptères Cetoniidae Euchroeina, part II: Biologie et formes larvaires

In English:

- A new species of Hapalemur (primates) from south east Madagascar

This list is incomplete.
