= Calumma hilleniusi =

Conservation status
- Endangered (IUCN 3.1)

Scientific classification
- Kingdom: Animalia
- Phylum: Chordata
- Class: Reptilia
- Order: Squamata
- Suborder: Iguania
- Family: Chamaeleonidae
- Genus: Calumma
- Species: C. hilleniusi

Binomial name
- Calumma hilleniusi (Brygoo, Blanc & Domergue, 1973)
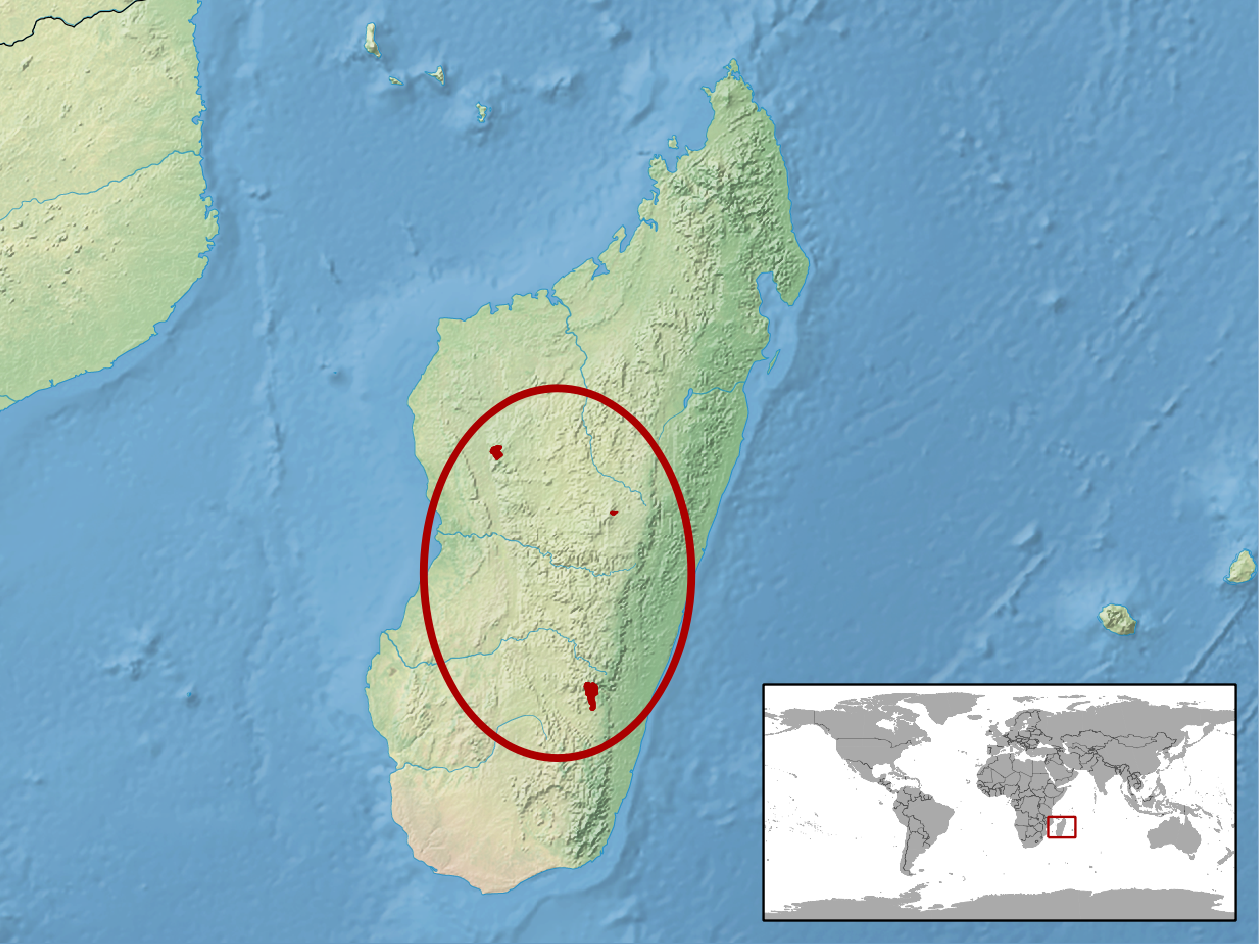

Synonyms
- Chamaeleo brevicornis hilleniusi Brygoo, Blanc & Domergue, 1973; Calumma brevicornis hilleniusi — Klaver & Böhme, 1986; Calumma hilleniusi — Glaw & Vences, 1994

Species of lizard

Calumma hilleniusi is a species of chameleon, a lizard in the family Chamaeleonidae. The species is endemic to Madagascar.

== Etymology ==
The specific name, hilleniusi, is in honor of Dutch herpetologist Dick Hillenius.

== Habitat ==
The preferred natural habitats of C. hilleniusi are forest and grassland, at altitudes of 1,550–2,550 m (5,090–8,370 ft).

== Reproduction ==
C. hilleniusi is oviparous. A female may lay a clutch of as many as ten eggs.
