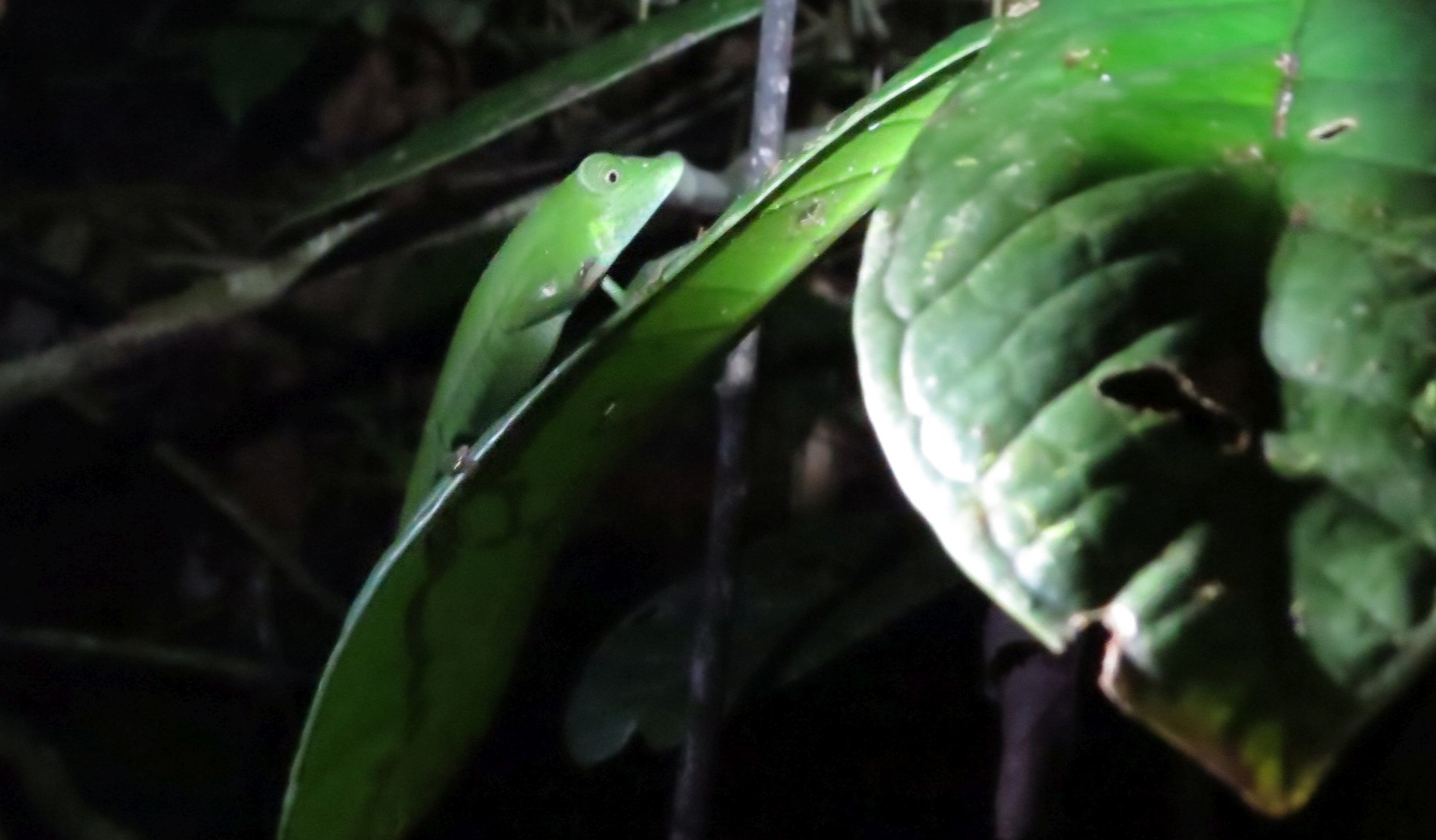

Conservation status
- Near Threatened (IUCN 3.1)

Scientific classification
- Kingdom: Animalia
- Phylum: Chordata
- Class: Reptilia
- Order: Squamata
- Suborder: Iguania
- Family: Chamaeleonidae
- Genus: Calumma
- Species: C. marojezense

Binomial name
- Calumma marojezense (Brygoo, Blanc & Domergue, 1970)
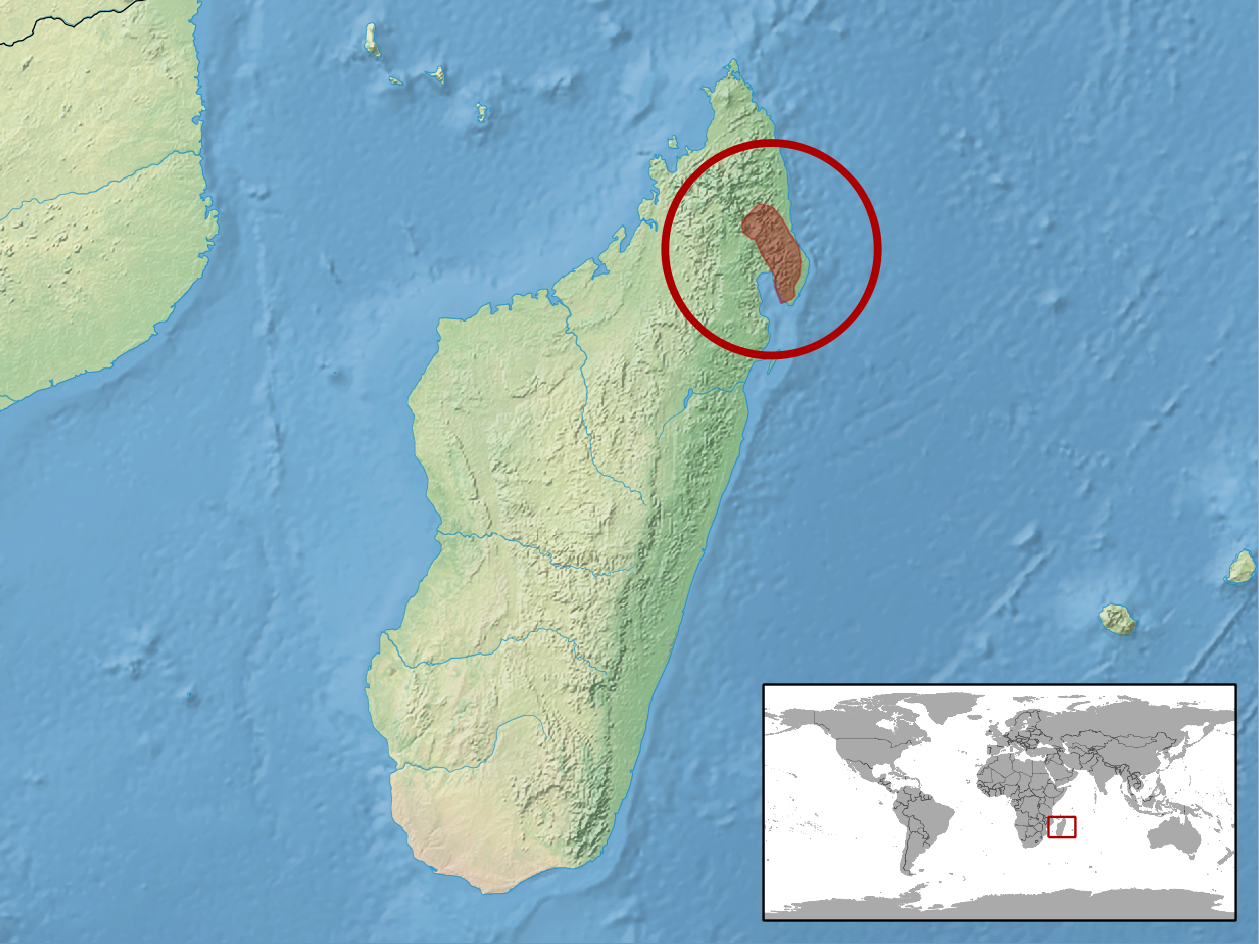

= Calumma marojezense =

Species of lizard

Calumma marojezense is a species of chameleon found in Madagascar.
