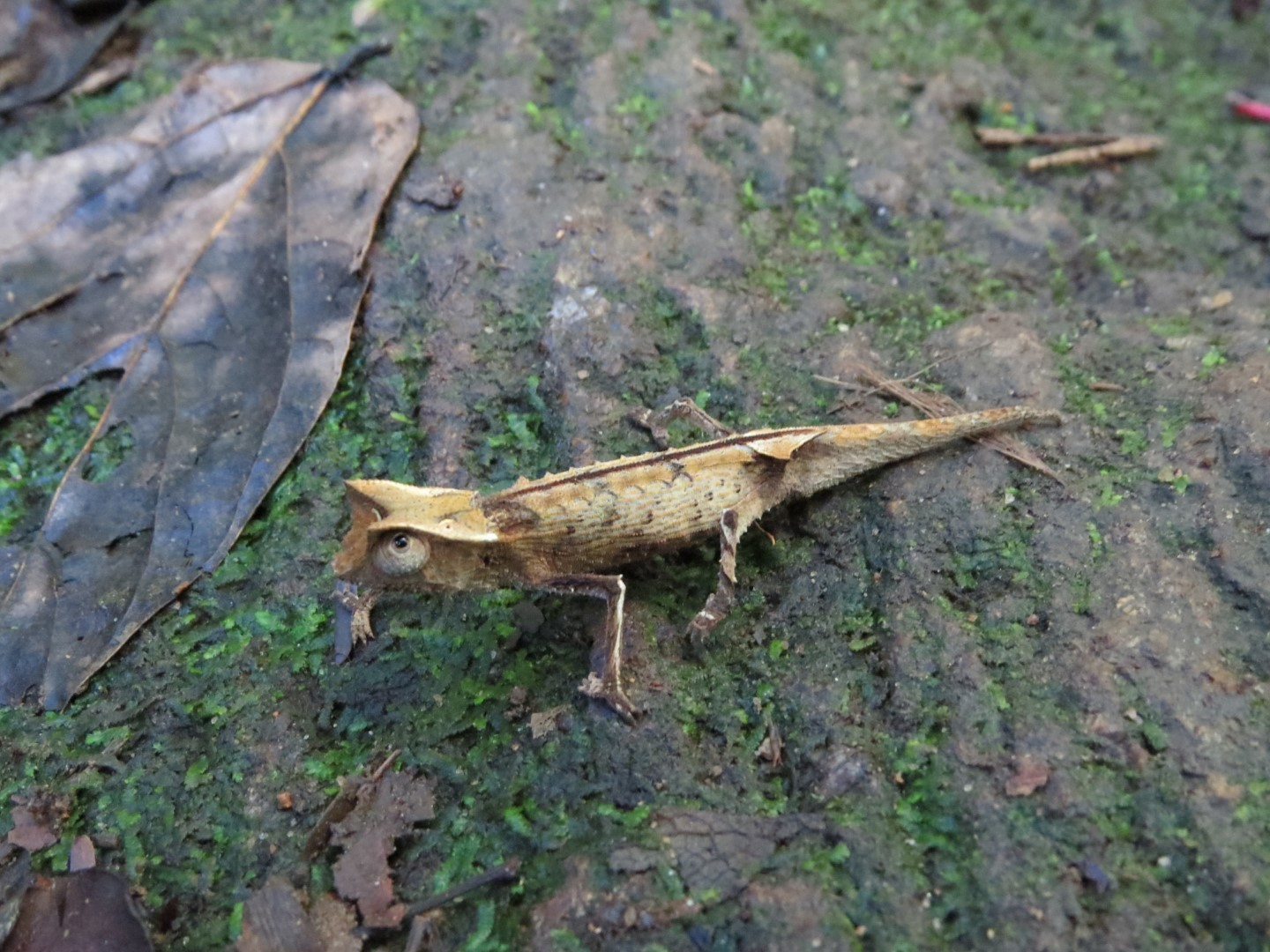
- In Sava, Madagascar

Conservation status
- Near Threatened (IUCN 3.1)

Scientific classification
- Kingdom: Animalia
- Phylum: Chordata
- Class: Reptilia
- Order: Squamata
- Suborder: Iguania
- Family: Chamaeleonidae
- Genus: Brookesia
- Species: B. griveaudi

Binomial name
- Brookesia griveaudi Brygoo, Blanc & Domergue, 1974
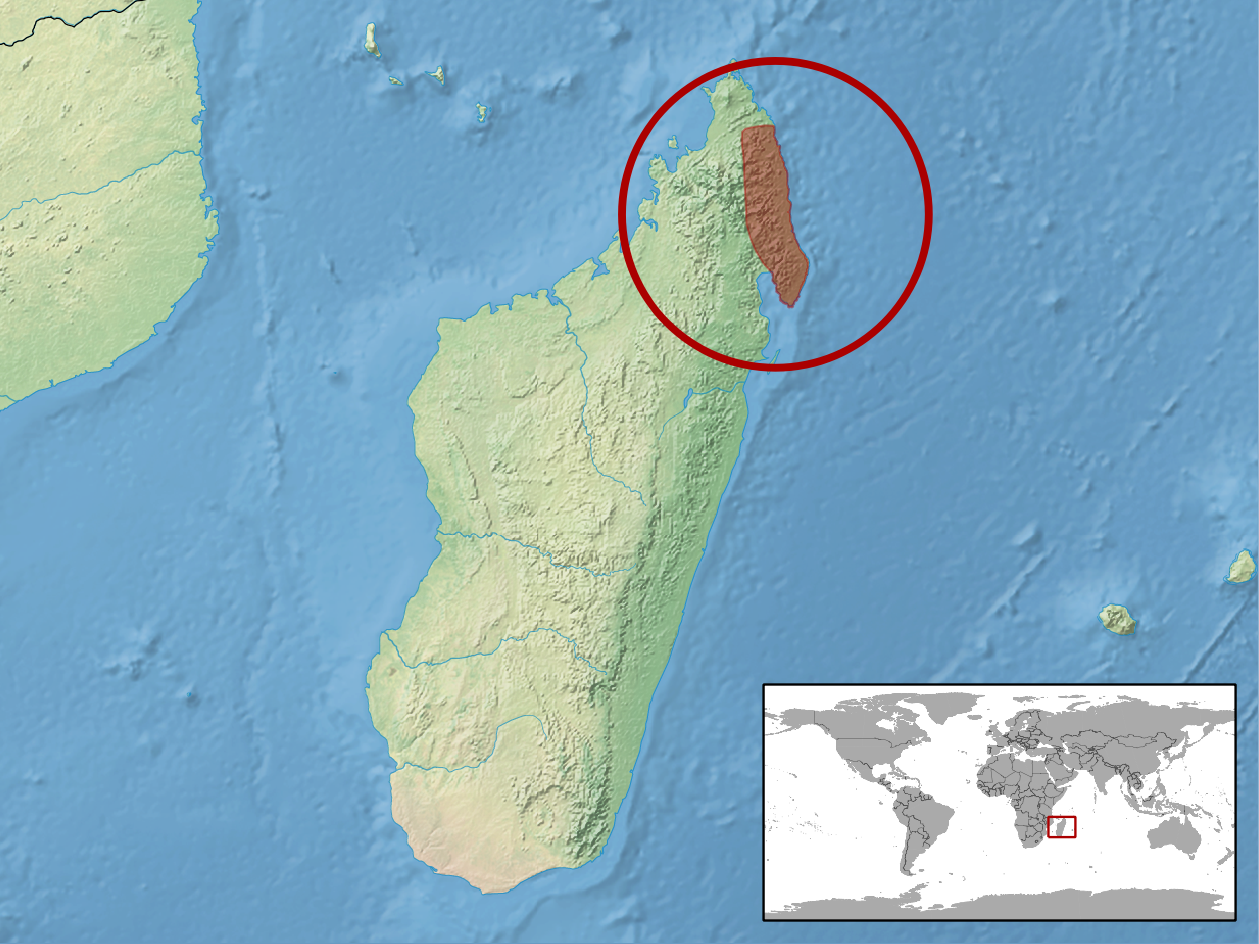

= Brookesia griveaudi =

Species of lizard

Brookesia griveaudi, commonly known as the Marojejy leaf chameleon, is a species of chameleon, a lizard in the family Chamaeleonidae. The species is endemic to northeastern Madagascar. It was described as a species new to science by Brygoo, Blanc, and Domergue in 1974. It is listed as Near Threatened by the International Union for Conservation of Nature.

== Etymology ==
The specific name, griveaudi, is in honor of French entomologist Paul Griveaud (1907–1980), who worked in Madagascar.

== Distribution and habitat ==
B. griveaudi is endemic to northeastern Madagascar, and has a type locality of the Marojejy National Park and on the Marojejy Massif, in the region of Sava. B. griveaudi is found over an area of 21,829 km^{2} (8,428 sq mi), beginning in Masoala (southwards) and ending at Daraina (northwards), and is found at an elevation of 1,350 m (4,430 ft) above mean sea level.

== Conservation status ==
The International Union for Conservation of Nature has listed B. griveaudi as Near Threatened because the population of the species is spread out considerably, despite the area it covers. It is affected mainly by logging and the slash-and-burn method of agriculture. The species is found in many protected places/areas, and the population is believed to be declining.

== Description ==
During the day, the Marojejy leaf chameleon stays with its young and eggs.

== Taxonomy ==
The species B. griveaudi was initially described by Brygoo, Blanc, and Domergue in 1974, and has been published on three times since: Glaw and Vences (1994: 236), Nečas (1999: 277), and, most recently, by Townsend et al. in 2009. B. griveaudi is commonly known as the Marojejy leaf chameleon, after the type locality of the species.
