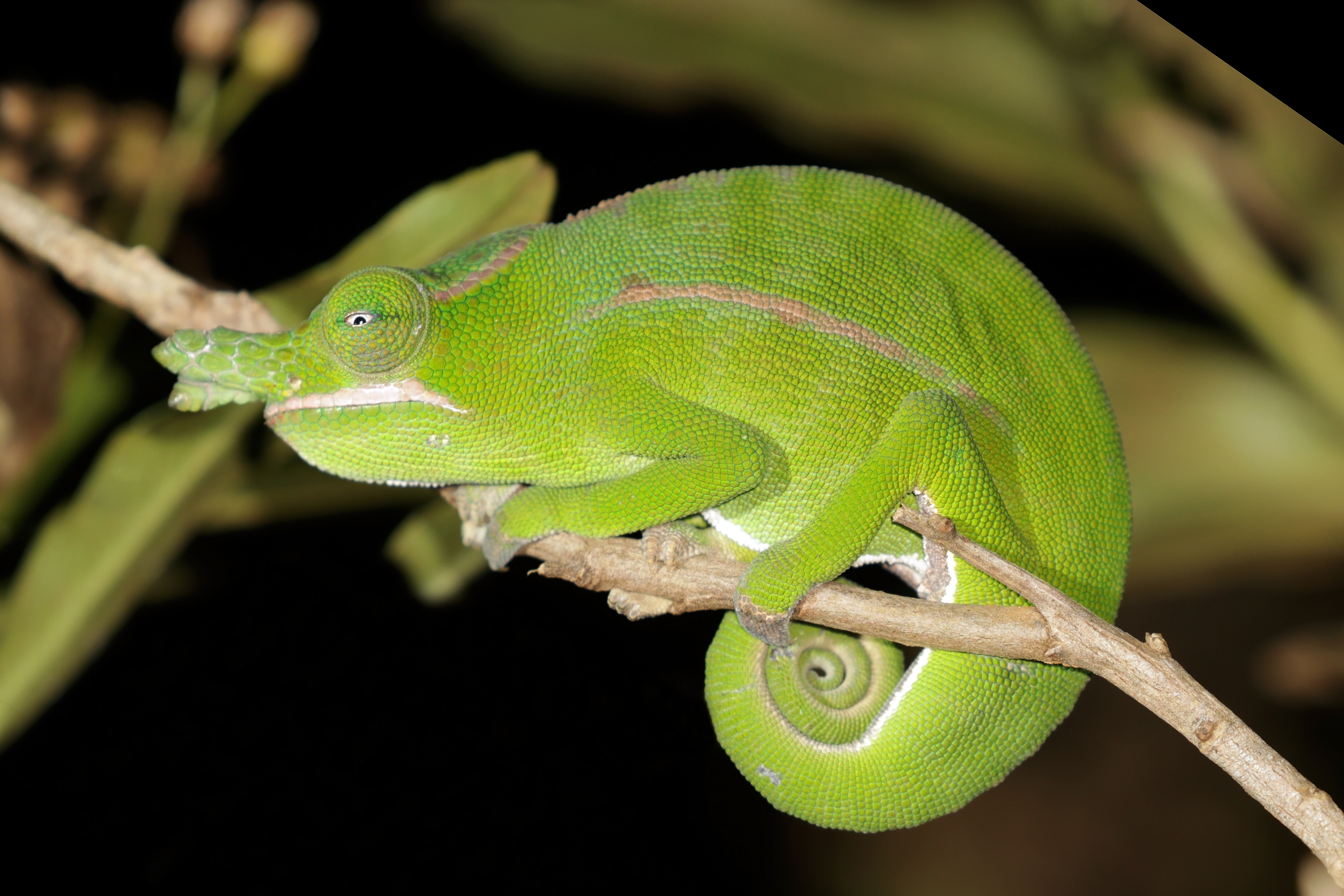
- Male in Montagne d'Ambre National Park

Conservation status
- Vulnerable (IUCN 3.1)

Scientific classification
- Kingdom: Animalia
- Phylum: Chordata
- Class: Reptilia
- Order: Squamata
- Suborder: Iguania
- Family: Chamaeleonidae
- Genus: Furcifer
- Species: F. petteri

Binomial name
- Furcifer petteri (Brygoo & Domergue, 1966)
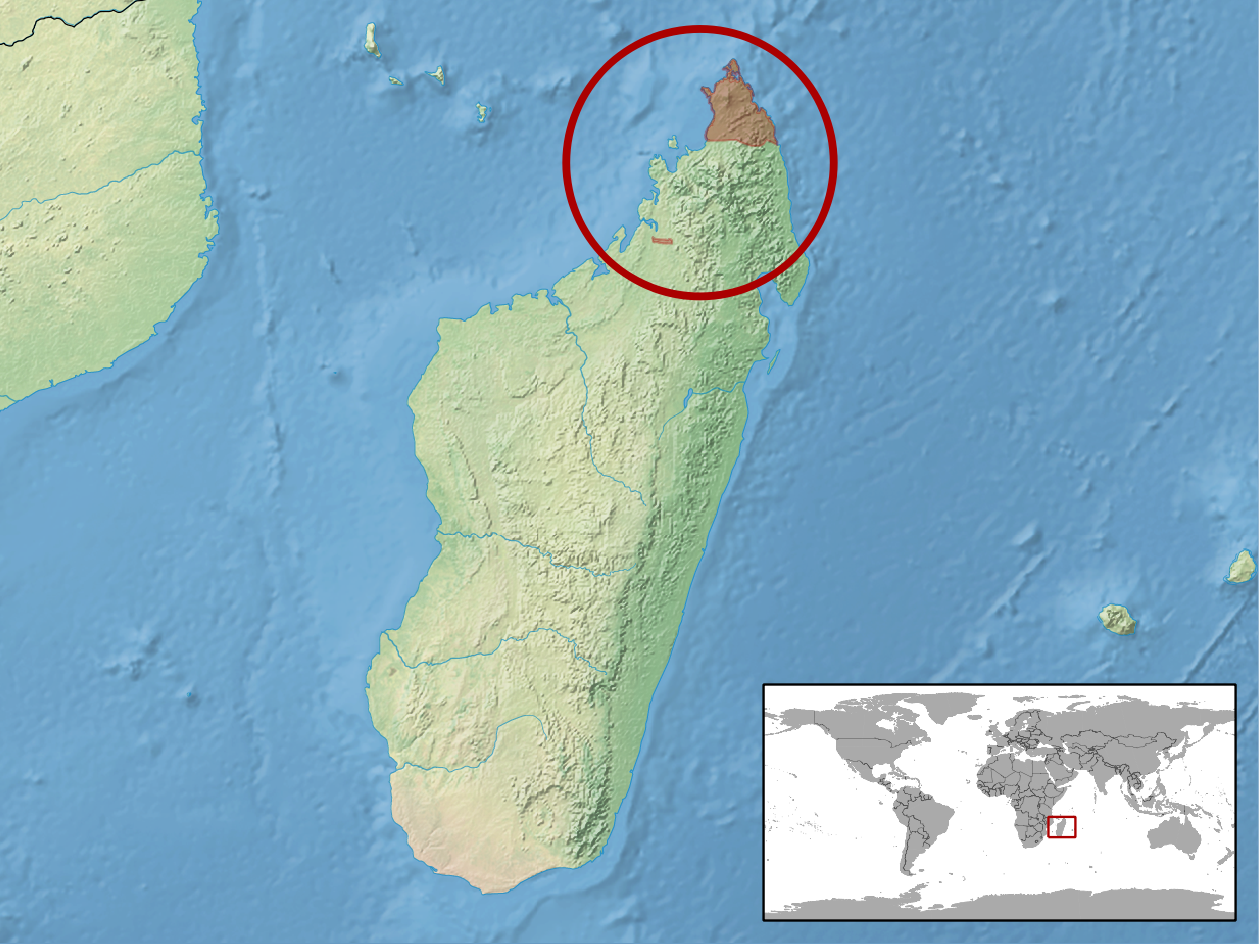
- Geographic range of Furcifer petteri in Madagascar.

Synonyms
- Chamaeleo willsii petteri Brygoo & Domergue, 1966

= Petter's chameleon =

Species of lizard

The Petter's chameleon (Furcifer petteri) is a species of chameleon, a lizard in the family Chamaeleonidae. The species is endemic to Madagascar. Furcifer petteri was initially described as the subspecies Chamaeleo willsii petteri by Édouard-Raoul Brygoo and Charles Domergue in 1966, but later transferred to the genus Furcifer and given full species status by Frank Glaw and Miguel Vences in 1994.

== Etymology ==
Both the specific name, petteri, and the common name, Petter's chameleon, are in honour of French primatologist Jean-Jacques Petter.

== Geographic distribution ==
Furcifer petteri is found in extreme northern Madagascar. Its type locality is the eastern edge of the Ankarana Reserve, specifically the Ankarana massif (French: Bordure Est du massif de l'Ankarana, Madagascar).

== Conservation status and habitat ==
Furcifer petteri is listed as a vulnerable species by the International Union for Conservation of Nature (IUCN) because its geographic range only covers an area of 11,000 square kilometres (4,200 square miles) in northern Madagascar, where the remaining forest is in decline. It lives between 120 and 850 metres (390 and 2,790 feet) above mean sea level, where it is threatened by mining, logging for rosewood and charcoal, and fires.

== Description ==
Male specimens of Furcifer petteri are approximately 16–18 centimetres (6.3–7.1 inches) in total length (tail included), and their main colour is deep green with lateral white stripes and white lips. Female specimens are slightly smaller than males, and have similar colouration. When females are excited, they change colours quickly, becoming yellow-lemon with two spots of light blue, and one of red. An average of both genders shows a total length of 16 centimetres (6.3 inches).

== Reproduction ==
Furcifer petteri is oviparous.

== Taxonomy ==
Furcifer petteri was initially described as Chamaeleo willsii petteri by Brygoo and Domergue in 1966. It is commonly known as Petter's chameleon. According to the Integrated Taxonomic Information System, Furcifer petteri is the valid name for this species.
