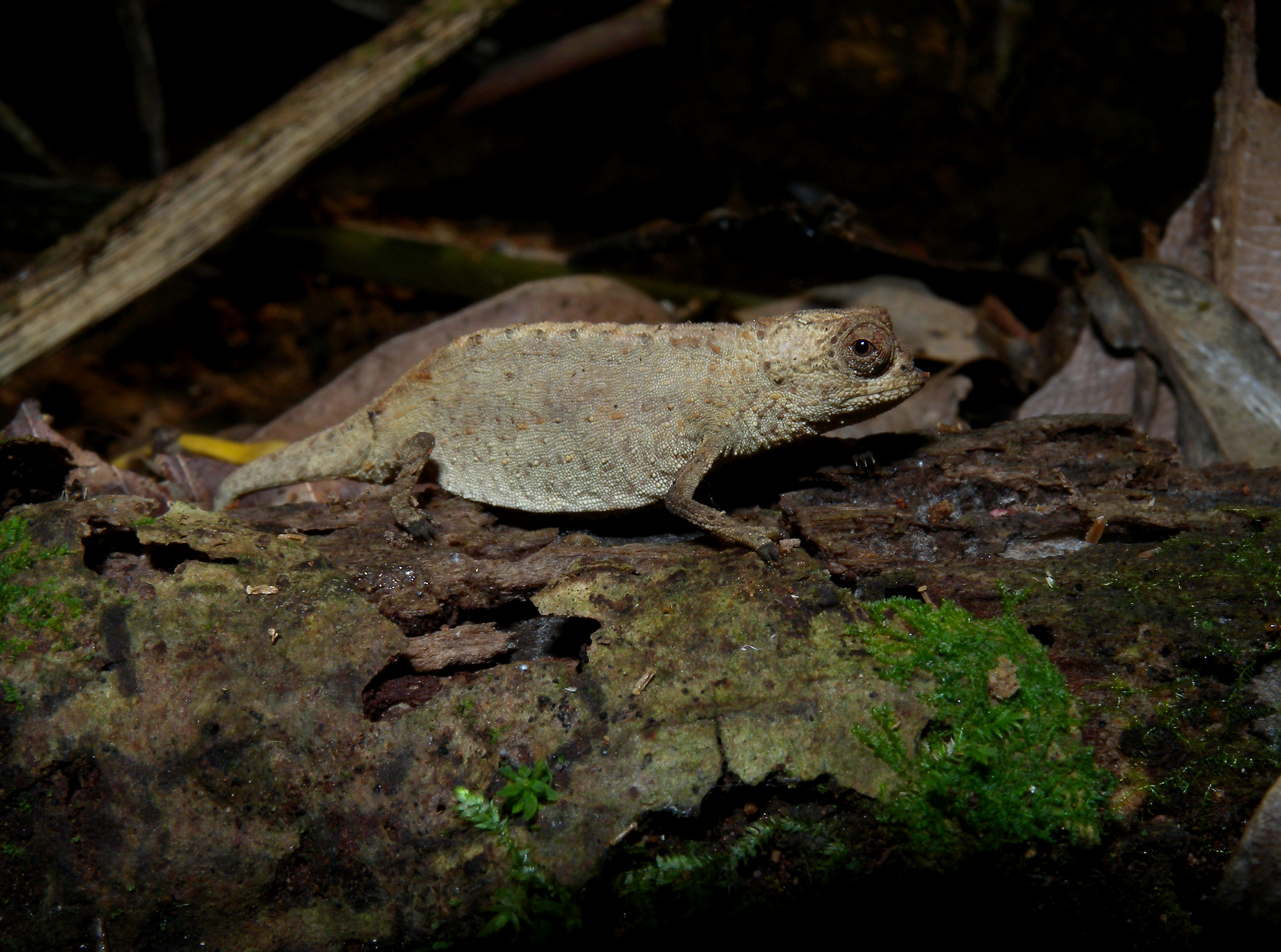

Conservation status
- Endangered (IUCN 3.1)

Scientific classification
- Kingdom: Animalia
- Phylum: Chordata
- Class: Reptilia
- Order: Squamata
- Suborder: Iguania
- Family: Chamaeleonidae
- Genus: Brookesia
- Species: B. peyrierasi

Binomial name
- Brookesia peyrierasi Brygoo & Domergue, 1974
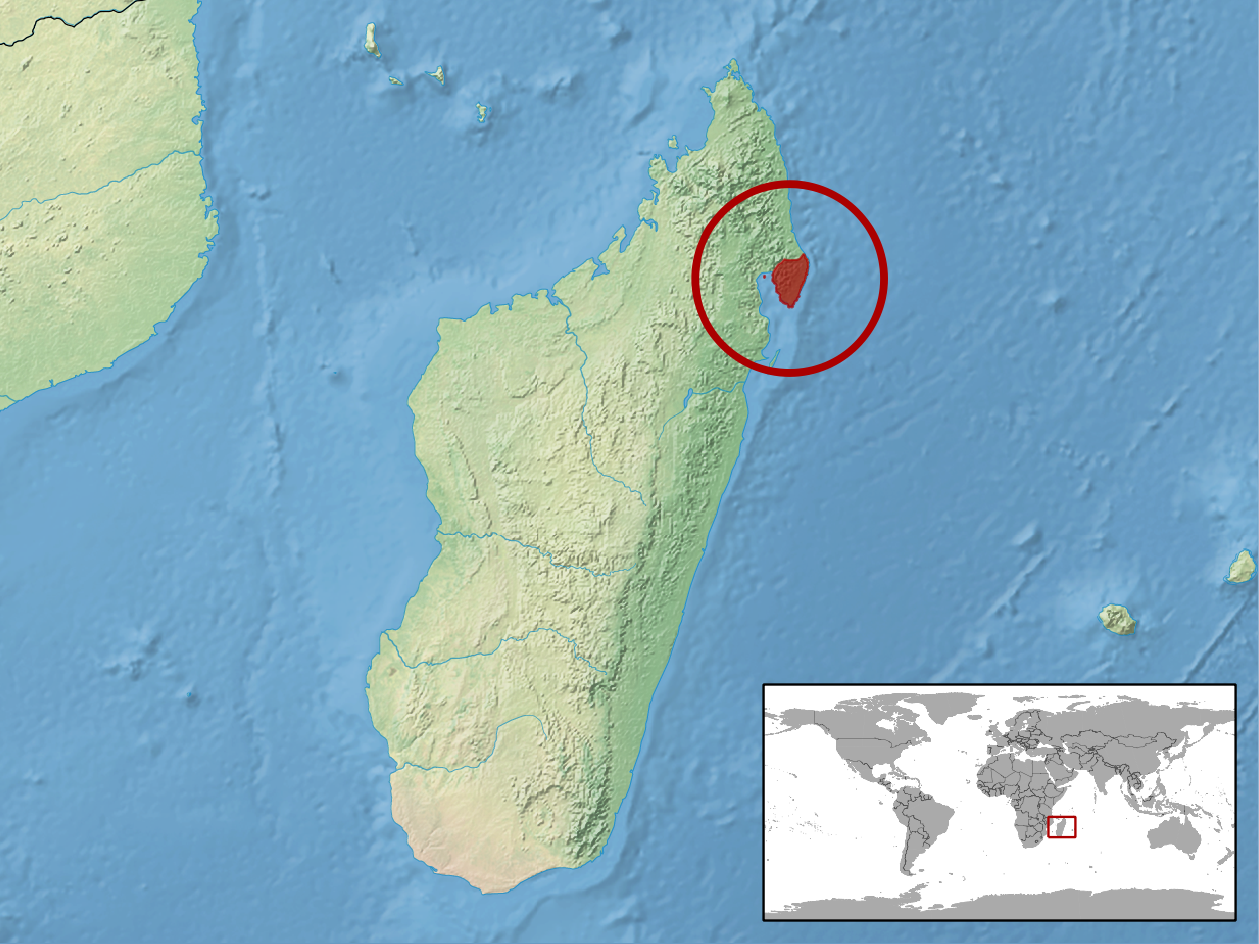

= Brookesia peyrierasi =

Species of lizard

Brookesia peyrierasi, also known commonly as Peyrieras' dwarf chameleon and Peyrieras's pygmy chameleon, is a species of diminutive chameleon, a lizard in the family Chamaeleonidae. The species is endemic to Madagascar.

== Etymology ==
Brookesia peyrierasi is named after French herpetologist André Peyriéras.

== Geographic distribution ==
Brookesia peyrierasi is found in northeastern Madagascar.

== Similar species ==
A 1999 paper in the Journal of Zoology disputed a 1995 paper which had considered this species and Brookesia tuberculata to be the same species as Brookesia minima. The later paper discussed the same details as the first – subtle morphological differences in the hemipenises of the respective species – and determined that the species were not conspecific. They also found differences in the arrangement of head crests and in minute spines above the eyes.

== Habitat ==
The natural habitat of Brookesia peyrierasi is forest.

== Reproduction ==
Brookesia peyrierasi is oviparous.
