= Calumma tsaratananense =

Conservation status
- Vulnerable (IUCN 3.1)

Scientific classification
- Kingdom: Animalia
- Phylum: Chordata
- Class: Reptilia
- Order: Squamata
- Suborder: Iguania
- Family: Chamaeleonidae
- Genus: Calumma
- Species: C. tsaratananense

Binomial name
- Calumma tsaratananense (Brygoo & Domergue, 1967)
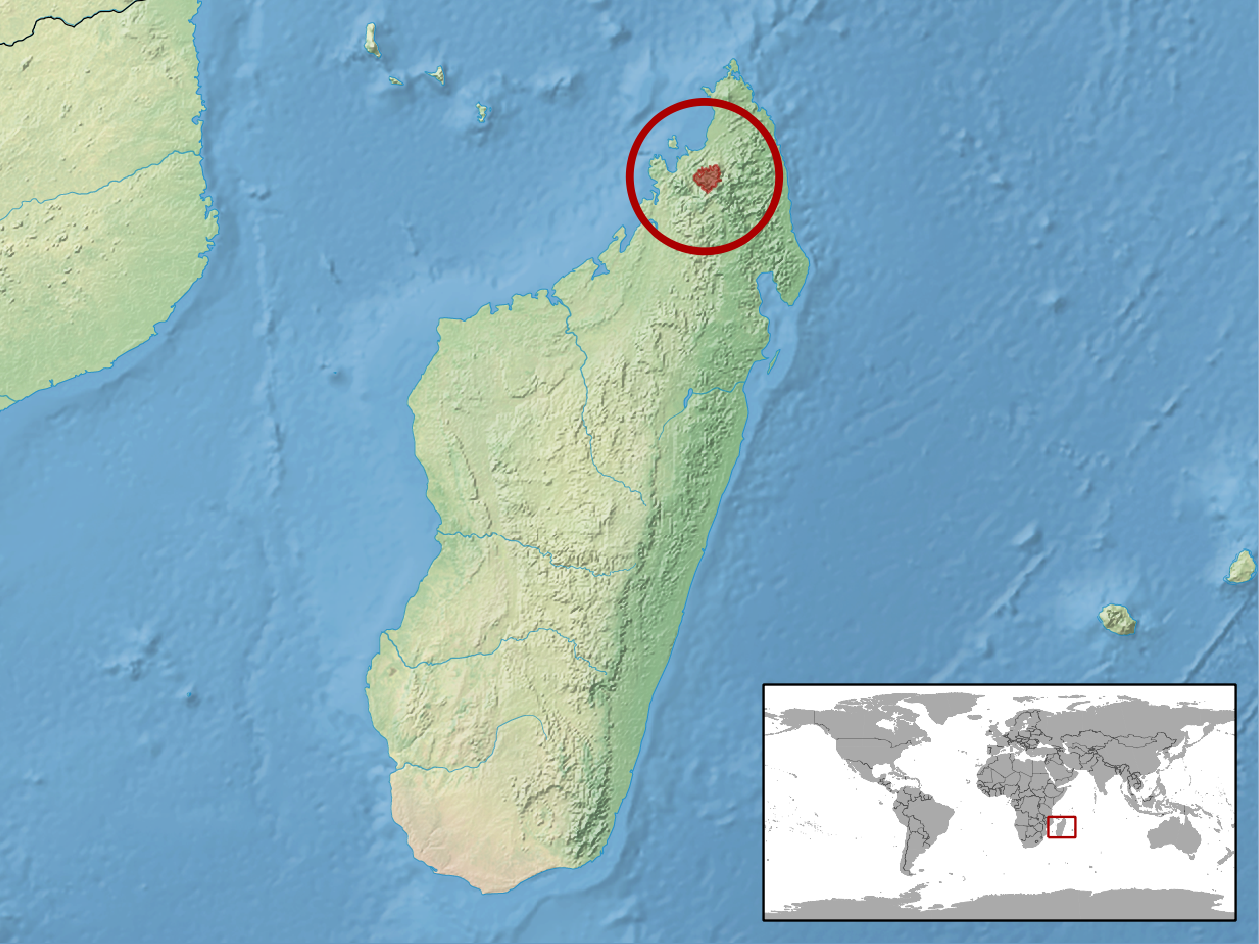

Species of lizard

Calumma tsaratananense, the Tsaratanana chameleon, is a species of chameleon found in Madagascar.

== Range and habitat ==
Calumma tsaratananense is known only from the Tsaratanana Massif, Madagascar's highest mountain, located in the northern portion of the island. It inhabits high-elevation heathland between 2,500 and 2,850 meters elevation in the ericoid thickets ecoregion. Its area of occupancy (AOO) is not well known. Tsaratanana Massif has an area of 492 km^{2}, but the chameleon's range is less than less than 100 km^{6}, and may be as little as 6 km^{2}.
