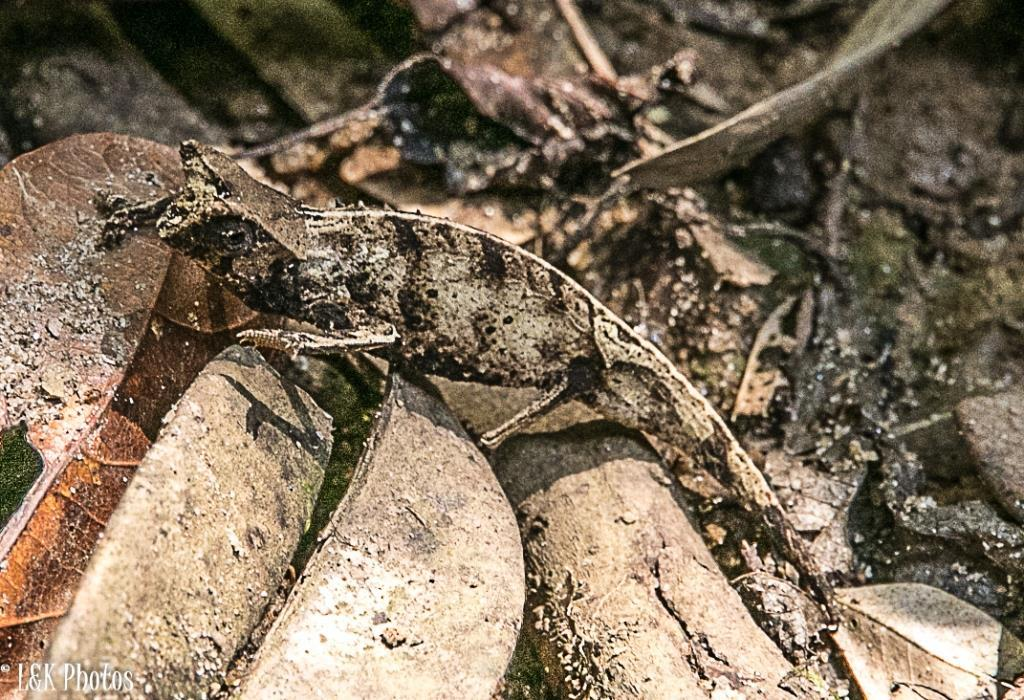

Conservation status
- Least Concern (IUCN 3.1)

Scientific classification
- Kingdom: Animalia
- Phylum: Chordata
- Class: Reptilia
- Order: Squamata
- Suborder: Iguania
- Family: Chamaeleonidae
- Genus: Brookesia
- Species: B. therezieni

Binomial name
- Brookesia therezieni Brygoo & Domerque, 1970
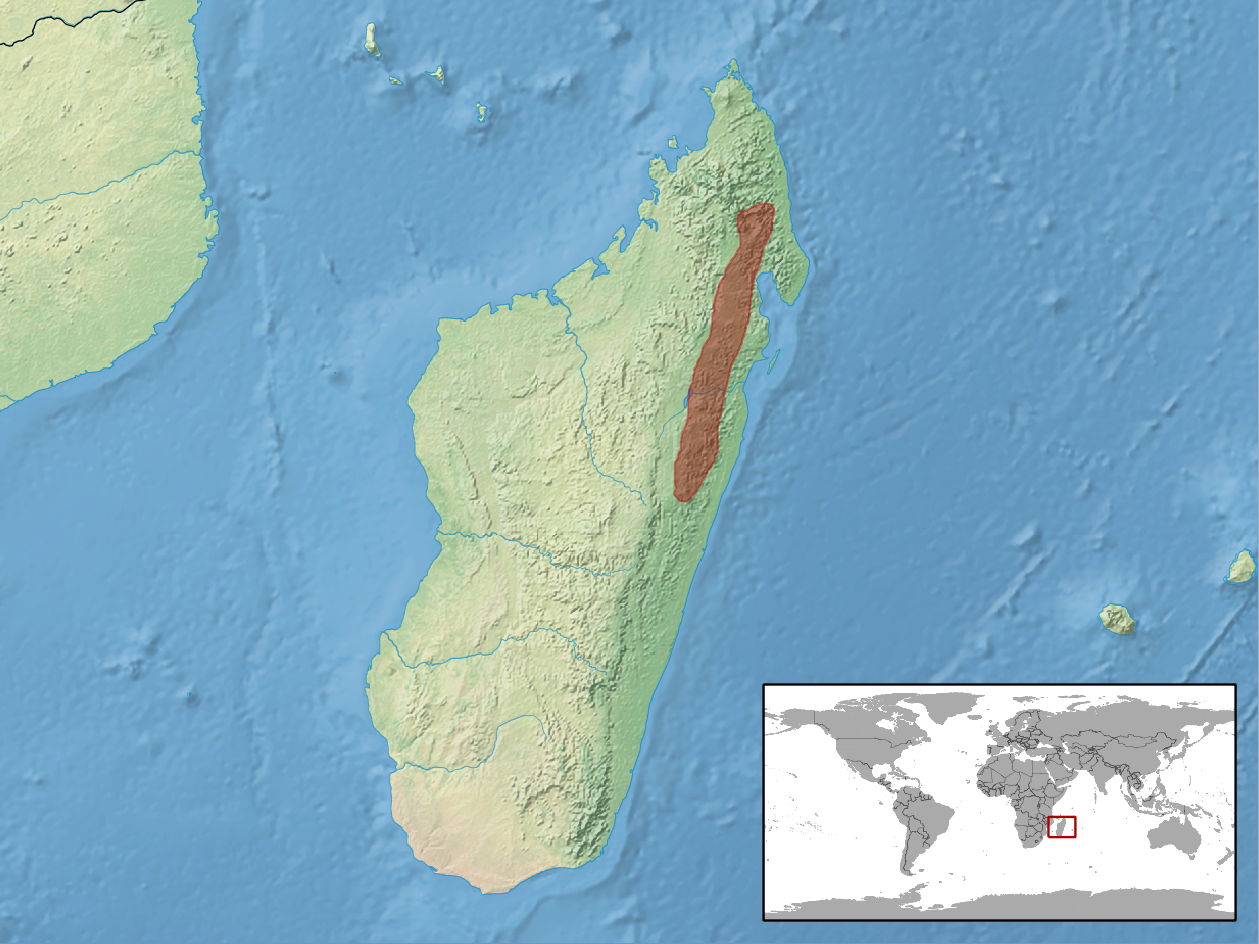

= Brookesia therezieni =

Species of lizard

Brookesia therezieni, also known as the Perinet leaf chameleon, is a species of lizards in the family Chamaeleonidae. The species is endemic to eastern Madagascar. The International Union for Conservation of Nature (IUCN) classed the species as Least Concern. B. therezieni was initially described as a species new to science by Édouard-Raoul Brygoo and Charles Antoine Domergue in 1970.

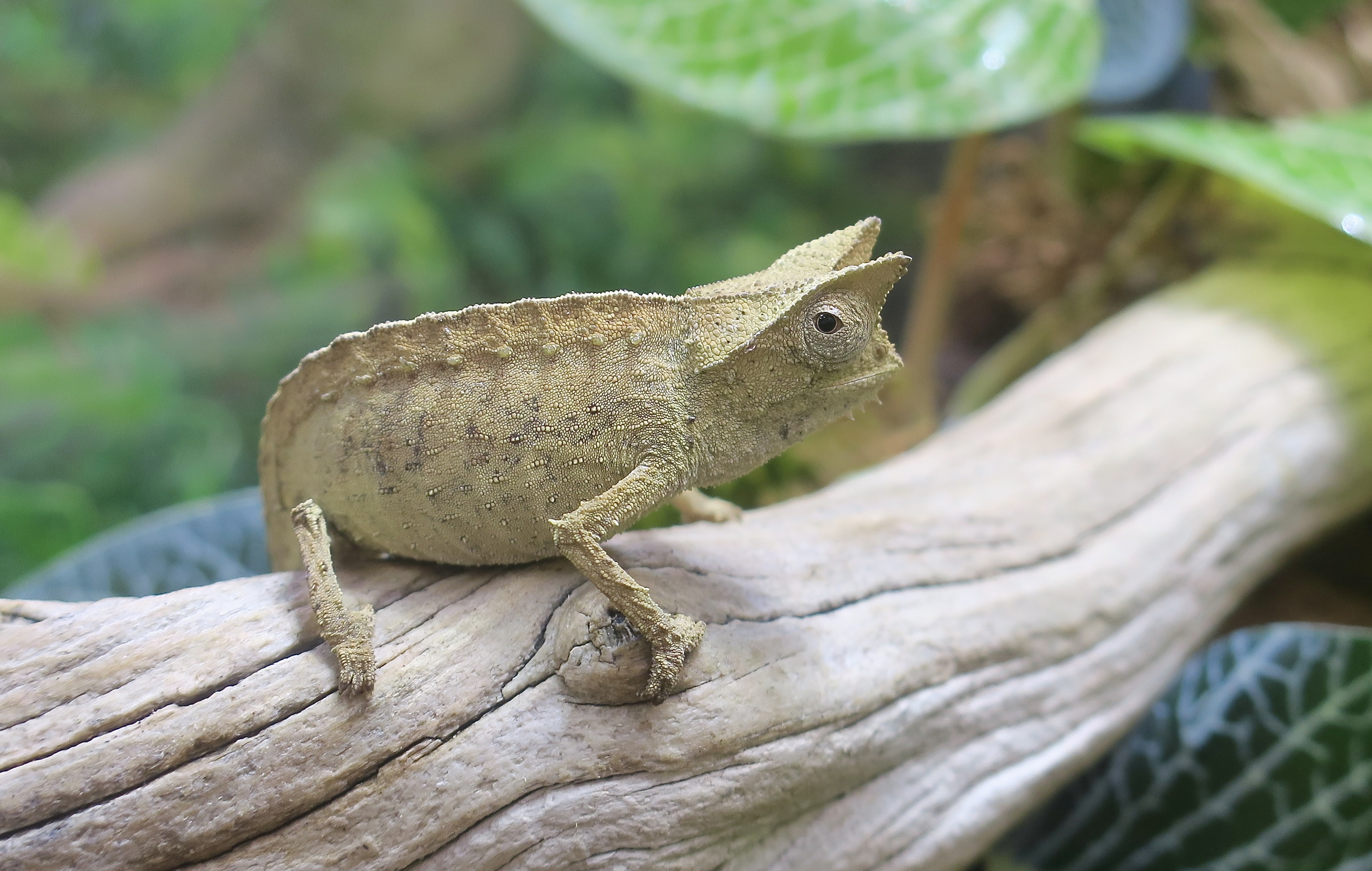
At LLL Reptiles, a reptile store in Henderson, Nevada.

== Etymology ==
The specific name, therezieni, is in honor of French hydrobiologist Yves Thérézien.

== Distribution and habitat ==
Endemic to eastern Madagascar, Brookesia therezieni is found in the type locality of the species, Périnet, which is why it is known as the Perinet leaf chameleon. It is also found in the east-central area of Madagascar: An'Ala, Ankeniheny, Andasibe, Anjanaharibe, Mantadia, and Imerimandroso. It can be found at elevations between 900 and 1,500 m (3,000 and 4,900 ft) above mean sea level, and is estimated to be found over an area of 30,444 km^{2} (11,754 sq mi). Its preferred natural habitat is forest.

== Reproduction ==
B. therezieni is oviparous.

== Conservation status ==
The International Union for Conservation of Nature has ranked B. therezieni as Least Concern on its Red List of Threatened Species, as it is found on a too large area to be concerned about and evidence is insufficient to indicate the number of specimens is declining quickly. However, the population is declining and their numbers have decreased.

== Taxonomy ==
Brookesia therezieni was first described by Brygoo and Domerque in 1970. According to the Integrated Taxonomic Information System, the taxonomic status of this species is valid.
