= Calumma guillaumeti =

Conservation status
- Least Concern (IUCN 3.1)

Scientific classification
- Kingdom: Animalia
- Phylum: Chordata
- Class: Reptilia
- Order: Squamata
- Suborder: Iguania
- Family: Chamaeleonidae
- Genus: Calumma
- Species: C. guillaumeti

Binomial name
- Calumma guillaumeti (Brygoo, Blanc & Domergue, 1974)
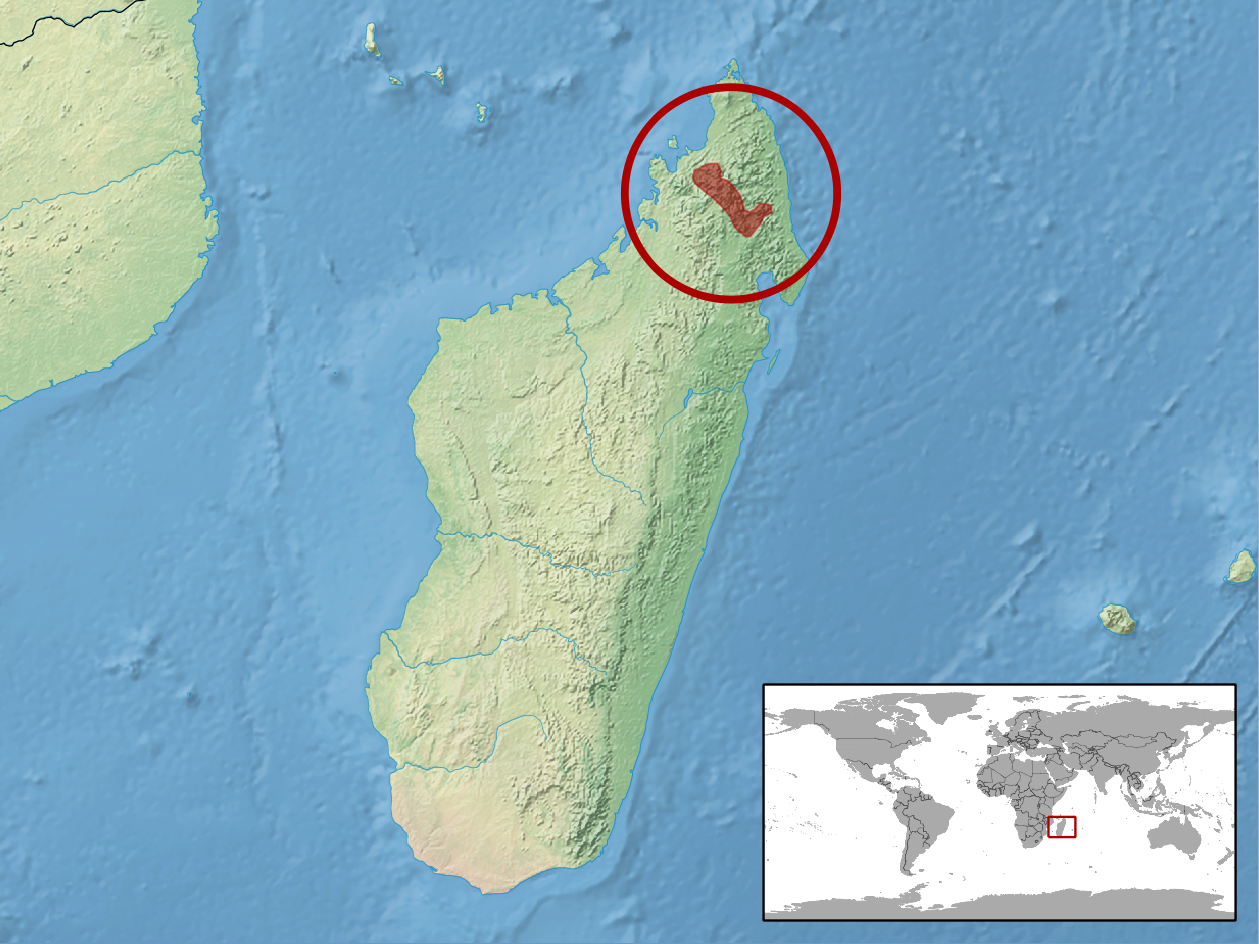

Synonyms
- Chamaeleo gastrotaenia guillaumeti Brygoo, C. Blanc & Domergue, 1974; Calumma gastrotaenia guillaumeti — Klaver & Böhme, 1997; Calumma guillaumeti — Böhme, 1997

Species of lizard

Calumma guillaumeti is a species of chameleon, a lizard in the family Chamaeleonidae. The species is endemic to Madagascar.

== Etymology ==
The specific name, guillaumeti, is in honor of French botanist Jean-Louis Guillaumet.

== Geographic range ==
C. guillaumeti is found in northeastern Madagascar.

== Habitat ==
The preferred natural habitat of C. guillaumeti is forest, at altitudes of 1,250–1,675 m (4,101–5,495 ft).

== Reproduction ==
C. guillaumeti is oviparous.
