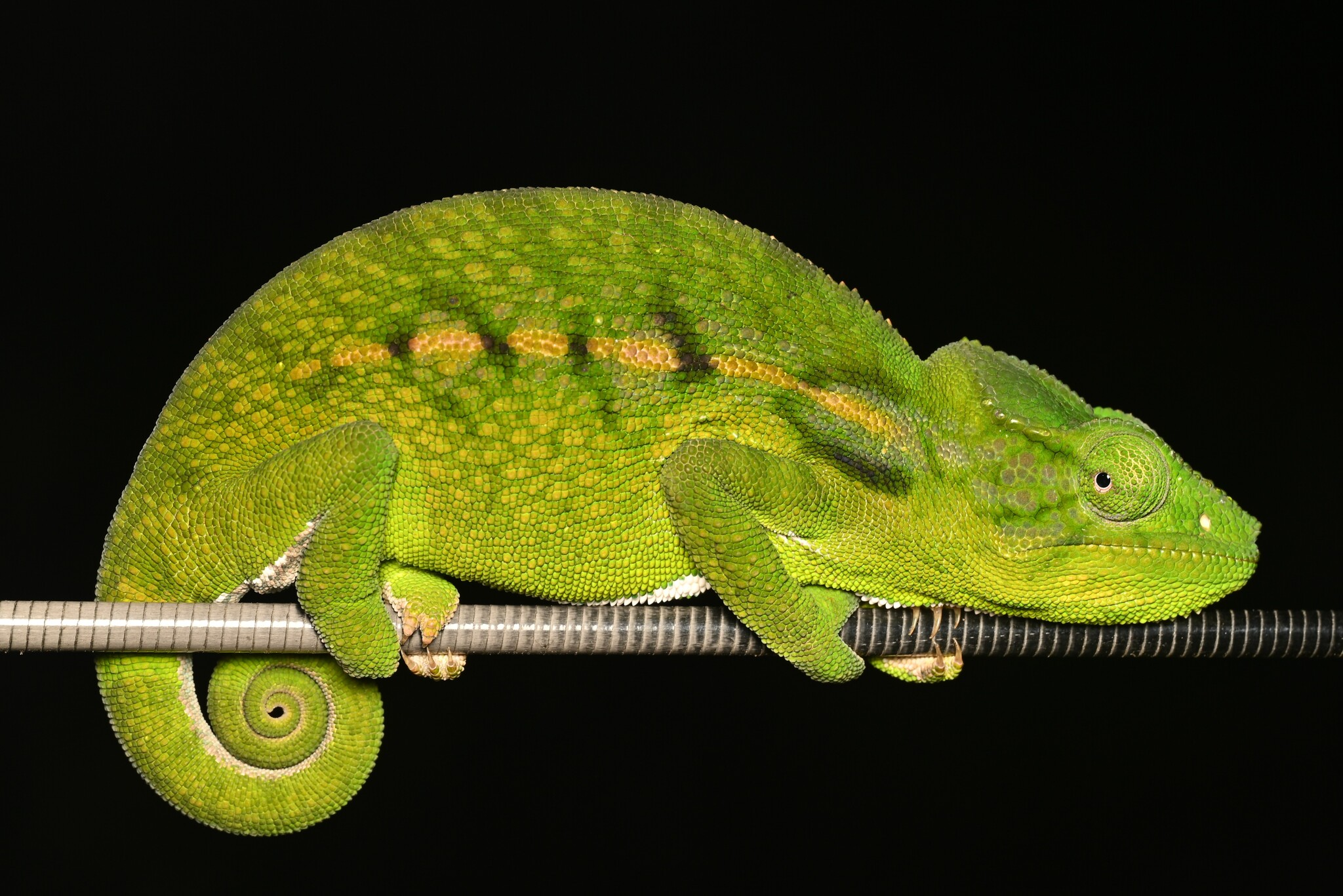

Conservation status
- Critically Endangered (IUCN 3.1)

Scientific classification
- Kingdom: Animalia
- Phylum: Chordata
- Class: Reptilia
- Order: Squamata
- Suborder: Iguania
- Family: Chamaeleonidae
- Genus: Furcifer
- Species: F. belalandaensis

Binomial name
- Furcifer belalandaensis (Brygoo & Domergue, 1970)
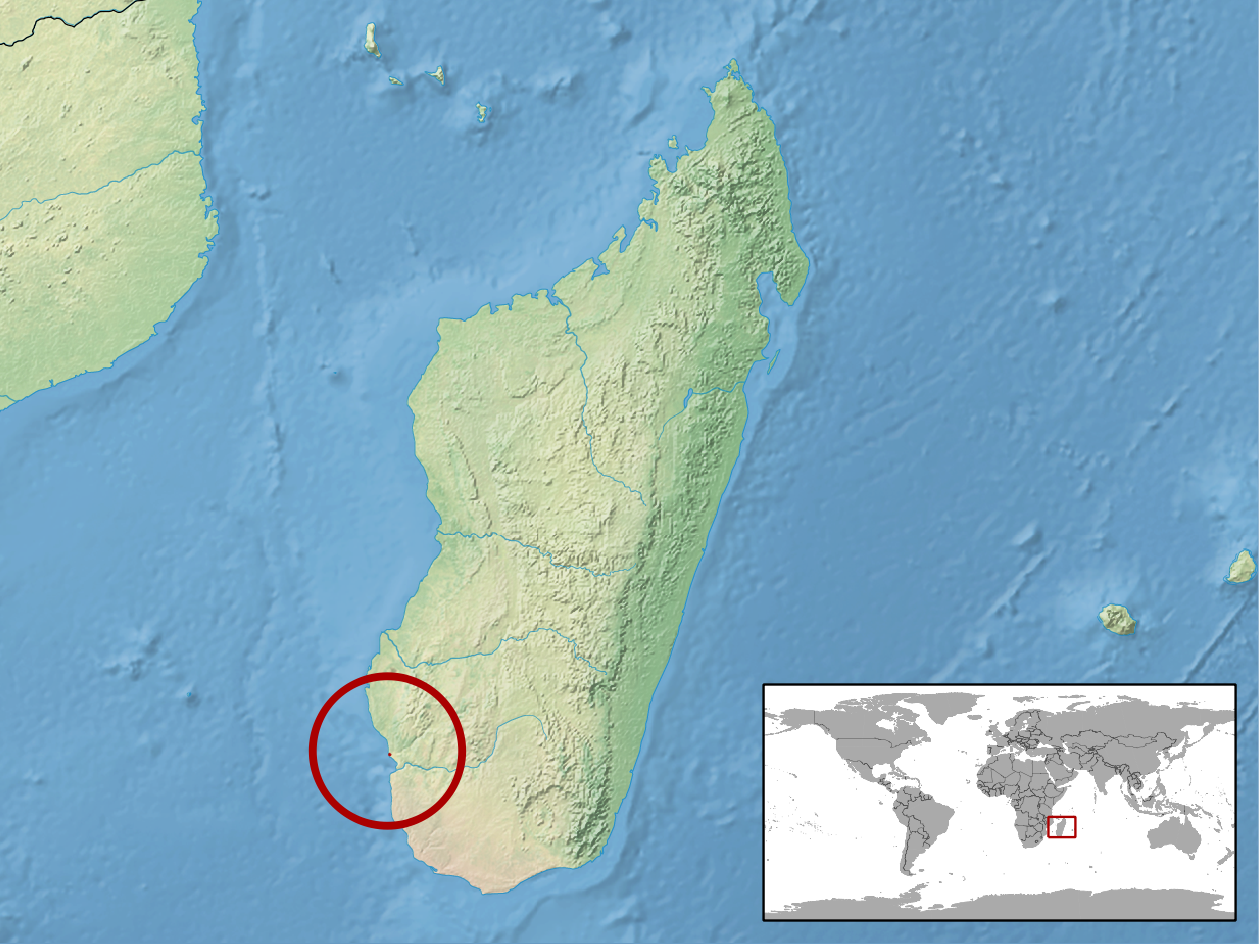

= Belalanda chameleon =

Species of lizard

Furcifer belalandaensis, also commonly known as the Belalanda chameleon or the Sangoritan'i Belalanda, is a species of chameleon that is endemic to Madagascar. It was identified and described by Édouard-Raoul Brygoo and Charles Domergue in 1970. The International Union for Conservation of Nature rated this species as Critically Endangered on their Red List of Threatened Species. The World Wide Fund for Nature is trying to save this species from extinction.

== Distribution and habitat ==
Furcifer belalandaensis is endemic to Belalanda, a town and rural commune in Toliara II District, Atsimo-Andrefana, south-west Madagascar. It is one of only five Critically Endangered reptiles extremely threatened by extinction. It has an extremely small range, being restricted to an area of 4 square kilometres (1 1/2 square miles). Its original habitat was gallery forest but this has all been cleared and it is now found in the canopies of the non-indigenous trees that have been planted and in the few remaining mature trees. Its main threat is from the significant amount of logging occurring for the manufacture of charcoal in this area. It can be found at between 18 and 20 metres (60 and 65 feet) above sea level. Although the true population of the Furcifer belalandaensis is unknown, the International Union for Conservation of Nature believes that the population is declining. In a local initiative, the municipal authority has taken steps to ban the collection and trade in this species and local people are involved in its preservation.

== Description ==
The Belalanda chameleon is green in colour. It has a casque similar to its relative the veiled chameleon, albeit somewhat smaller.

== Taxonomy ==
Furcifer belalandaensis was initially described as Chamaeleo belalandensis by Brygoo and Domergue in 1970, and is also known as the Belalanda chameleon and the Sangoritan'i Belalanda. Original combination: Chamaeleo belalandaensis Brygoo and Domergue, 1970, and Furcifer belalandaensis (Brygoo and Domergue, 1970), see: Glaw and Vences, 1994 and Necas, 1999.
