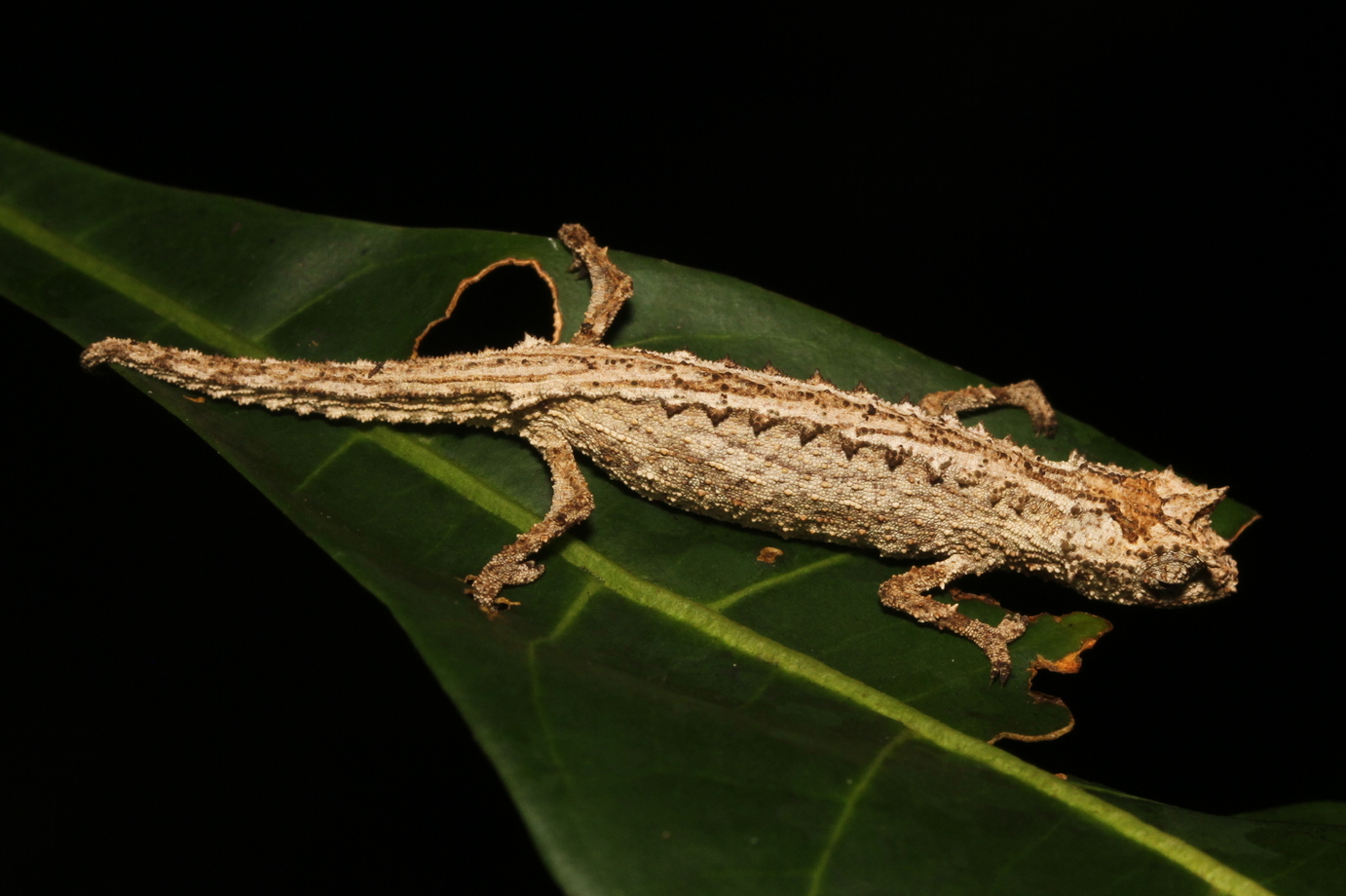

Conservation status
- Endangered (IUCN 3.1)

Scientific classification
- Kingdom: Animalia
- Phylum: Chordata
- Class: Reptilia
- Order: Squamata
- Suborder: Iguania
- Family: Chamaeleonidae
- Genus: Brookesia
- Species: B. karchei

Binomial name
- Brookesia karchei Brygoo, Blanc & Domergue, 1970
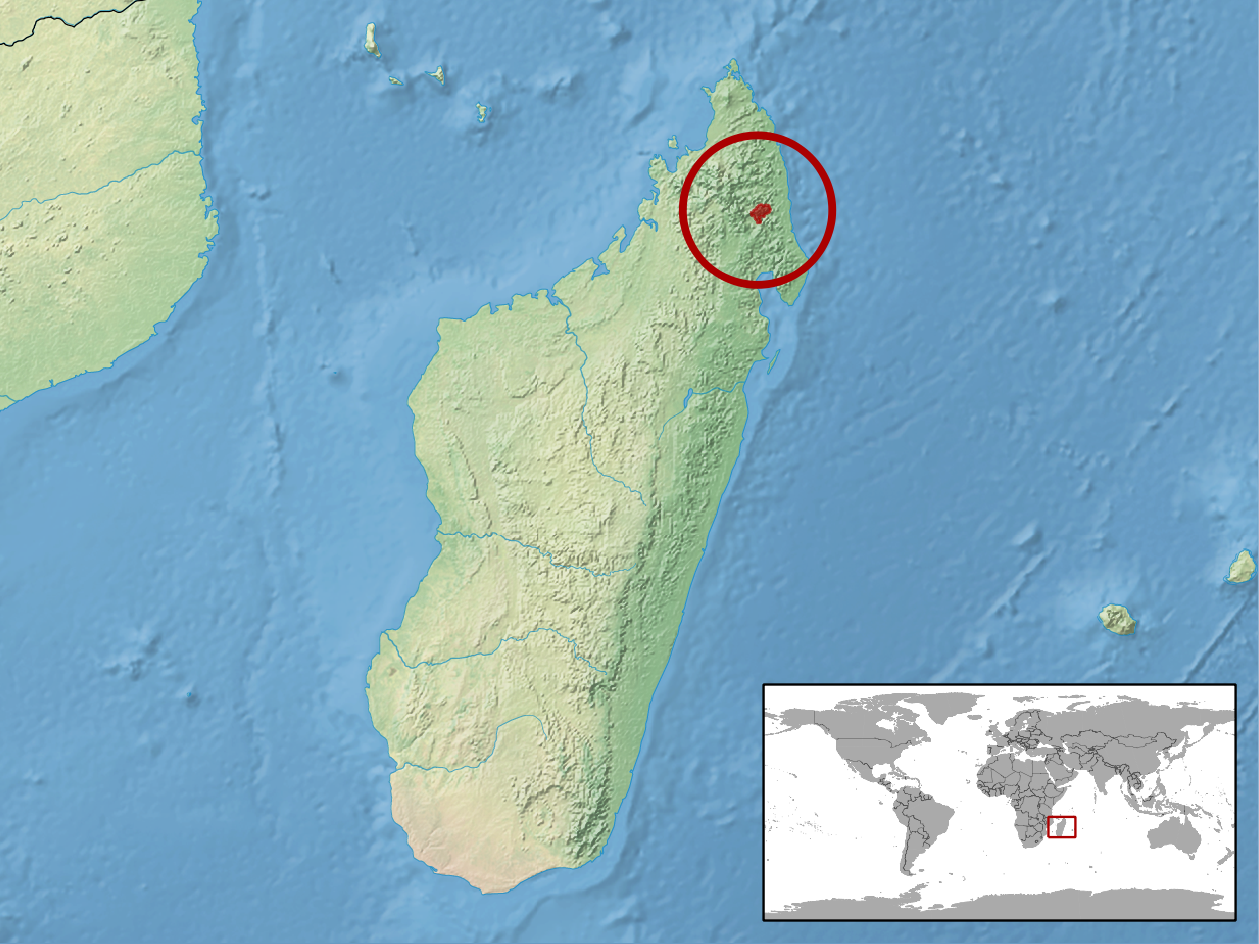
- Geographic range of Brookesia karchei in Madagascar.

= Naturelle leaf chameleon =

Species of lizard

The naturelle leaf chameleon (Brookesia karchei) is a species of chameleon, a lizard in the family Chamaeleonidae. The species is endemic to Madagascar. It was rated as an endangered species by the International Union for Conservation of Nature on its Red List of Threatened Species. The species was described by Édouard-Raoul Brygoo, Charles Pierre Blanc, and Charles Antoine Domergue in 1970.

== Etymology ==
The specific name, karchei, is in honor of geologist Jean-Paul Karche.

== Geographic range, habitat, and conservation status ==
The naturelle leaf chameleon is found in Madagascar in Marojejy National Park (Massif du Marojezy or Parc National de Marojejy) centered on the Marojejy Massif. It has only been found at elevations between 380 and 850 m (1,250 and 2,790 ft) above sea level. The species can be found over an area of 597 km^{2} (231 mi^{2}), and is listed as endangered by the International Union for Conservation of Nature, because of loss of "quality" forest habitat caused by the extraction of richly hued rosewood timber, although the true population of the species has not been determined. The extraction of rosewood is its main threat. It is terrestrial and is found in humid forests at mid- or low-elevation. In the Marojejy National Park, collection of this chameleon, and all others, is illegal.

== History ==
This species was initially described by Brygoo, Blanc, and Domergue in 1970 as Brookesia karchei. This scientific name was later referenced by Glaw and Vences in 1994: 240, Nečas in 1999: 277, Townsend et al. in 2009, and most recently Glaw et al. in 2012.

== Description ==
The female naturelle leaf chameleon measures 30.7 mm (1.21 in) in snout-vent length (SVL), and has a total length (including tail) of 51.0 mm (2.01 in).

== Reproduction ==
B. karchei is oviparous.
