= Calumma capuroni =

Conservation status
- Vulnerable (IUCN 3.1)

Scientific classification
- Kingdom: Animalia
- Phylum: Chordata
- Class: Reptilia
- Order: Squamata
- Suborder: Iguania
- Family: Chamaeleonidae
- Genus: Calumma
- Species: C. capuroni

Binomial name
- Calumma capuroni (Brygoo, Blanc & Domergue, 1972)
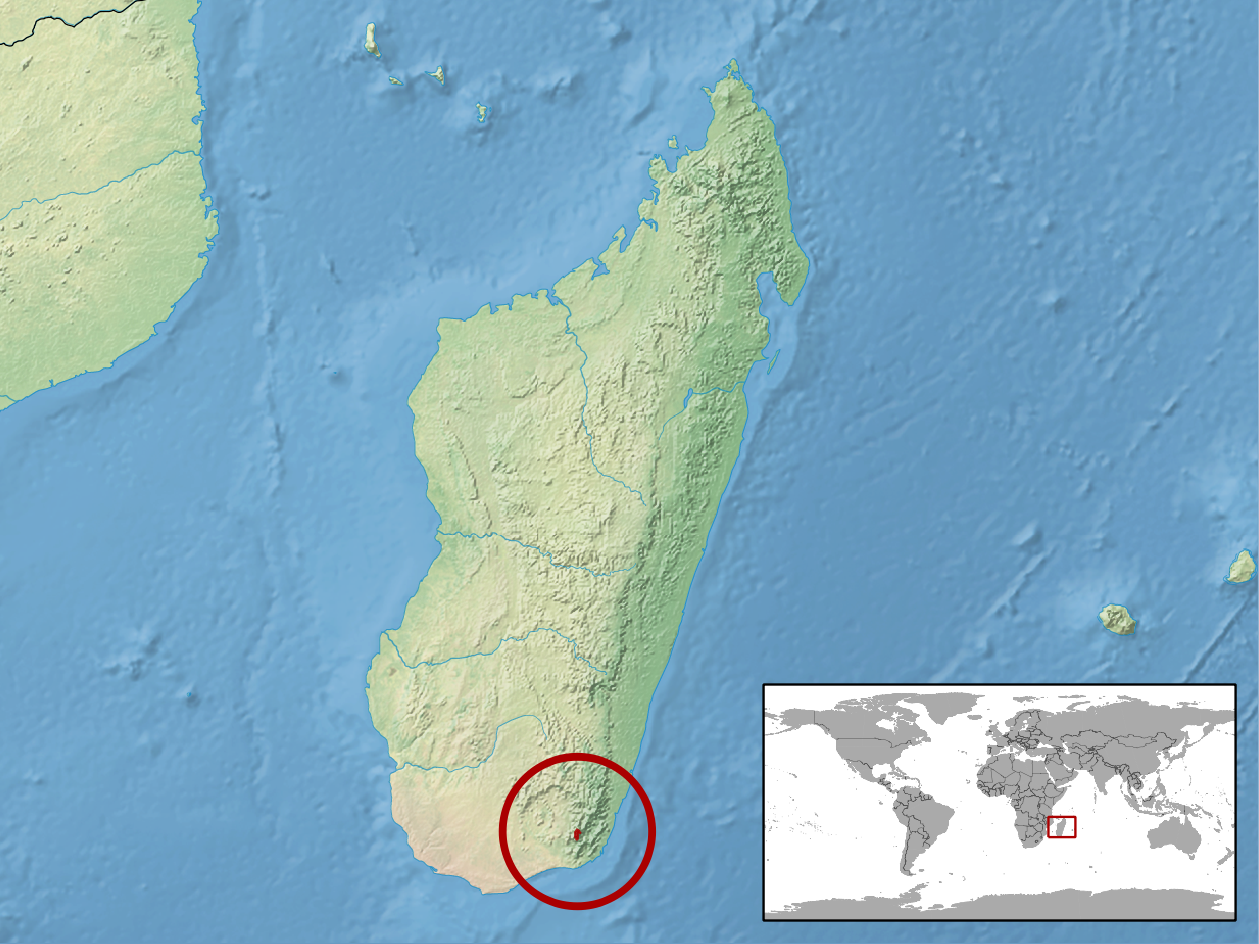

Synonyms
- Chamaeleo capuroni Brygoo, C. Blanc & Domergue, 1972; Calumma capuroni — Klaver & Böhme, 1986

Species of lizard

Calumma capuroni is a species of chameleon, a lizard in the family Chamaeleonidae. The species is endemic to Madagascar.

== Etymology ==
The specific name, capuroni is in honor of French botanist René Paul Raymond Capuron.

== Habitat ==
The preferred natural habitat of C. capuroni is forest at altitudes of 1,400–1,920 m (4,590–6,300 ft).

== Reproduction ==
C. capuroni is oviparous.
