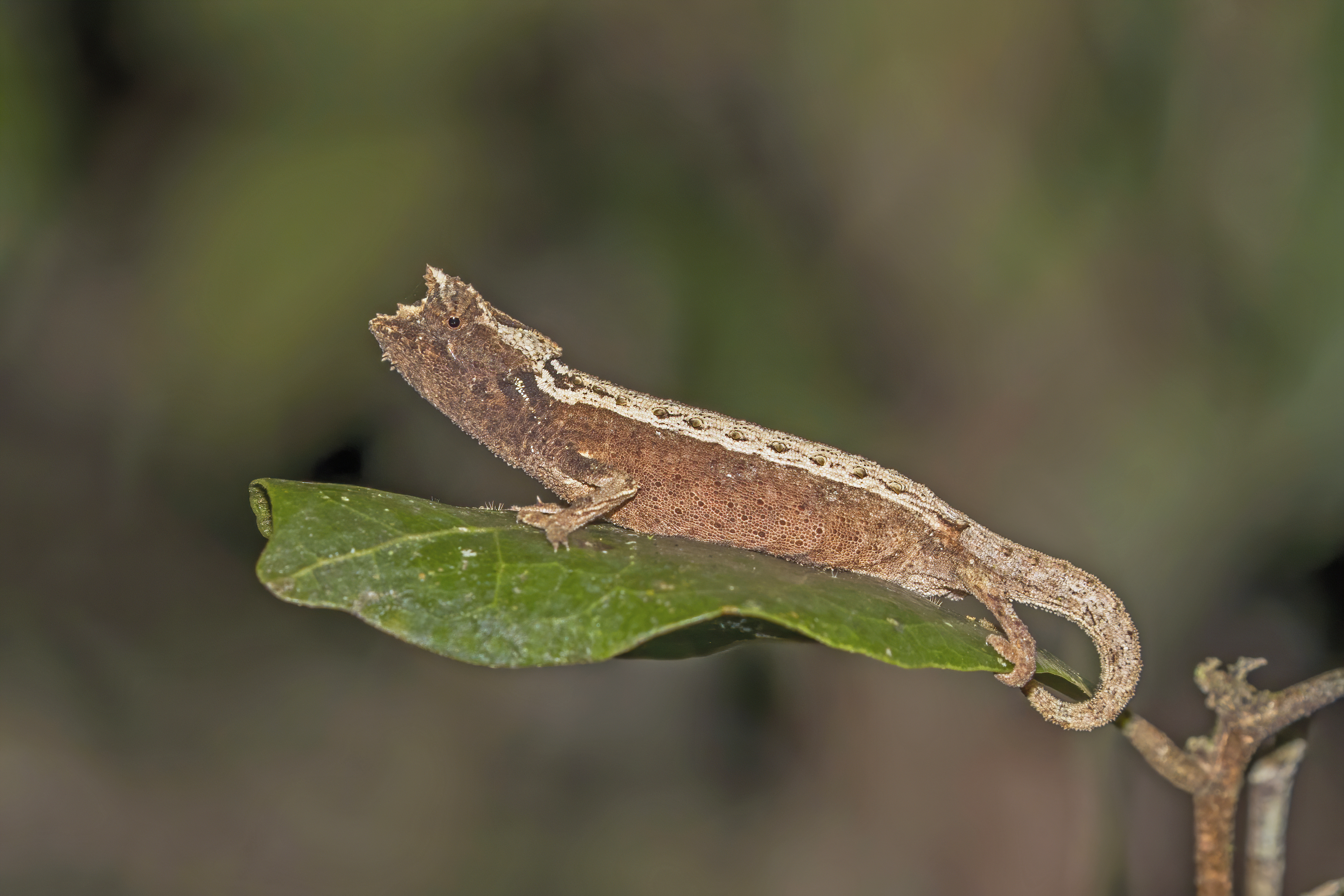
- Near Andasibe

Conservation status
- Least Concern (IUCN 3.1)

Scientific classification
- Kingdom: Animalia
- Phylum: Chordata
- Class: Reptilia
- Order: Squamata
- Suborder: Iguania
- Family: Chamaeleonidae
- Genus: Brookesia
- Species: B. thieli

Binomial name
- Brookesia thieli Brygoo & Domergue, 1969
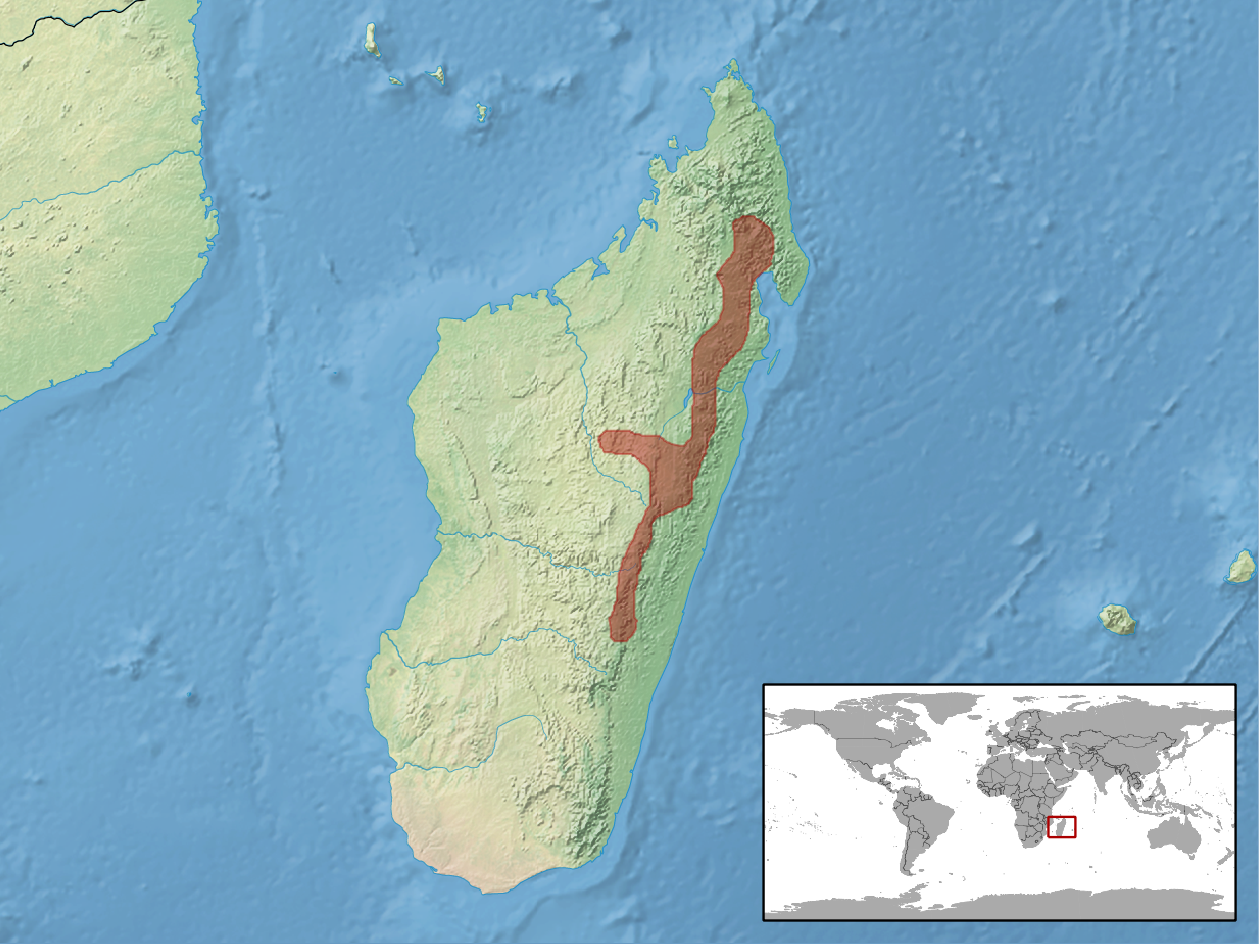

= Brookesia thieli =

Species of lizard

Brookesia thieli, commonly also known as Domergue's leaf chameleon or Thiel's pygmy chameleon, is a species of lizard in the family Chamaeleonidae. The species is endemic to eastern Madagascar, with a type locality of Ambodimanga, Andapa. It was first described in 1969 by Édouard-Raoul Brygoo and Charles Antoine Domergue, and it was ranked by the International Union for Conservation of Nature as "least concern". B. thieli is thought to be found over an area of 43,865 km^{2} (16,936 sq mi) at 875–1,200 m (2,871–3,937 ft) above sea level.

== Etymology ==
The specific name, thieli, is in honor of French botanist Jean Thiel, who is an expert on tropical forests.

== Distribution and habitat ==
B. thieli is found in eastern Madagascar, and its type locality is Ambodimanga, Madagascar. It can be found from Ranomafana (southwards) to Anjanaharibe-Sud (northwards), and the species has previously been found in Ambohitantely, Angavo-Anjozorobe, Analamazaotra, Mantadia, Marojejy, and Vohidrazana at elevations between 875 and 1,200 m (2,871 and 3,937 ft) above mean sea level. It is believed to be found in around 43,865 km^{2} (16,936 sq mi) of land. Its preferred natural habitat is forest.

== Reproduction ==
B. thieli is oviparous.

== Taxonomy ==
Brookesia thieli was first described in 1969 by Brygoo and Domergue. The same species was also described as Brookesia antoetrae by Brygoo and Domergue in 1971. Brookesia antoetrae was synonymized with Brookesia thieli by Raxworthy and Nussbaum in 1995, but not all subsequent authors have accepted this conclusion.
