= Édouard-Raoul Brygoo =

French physician, biologist and herpetologist (1920–2016)

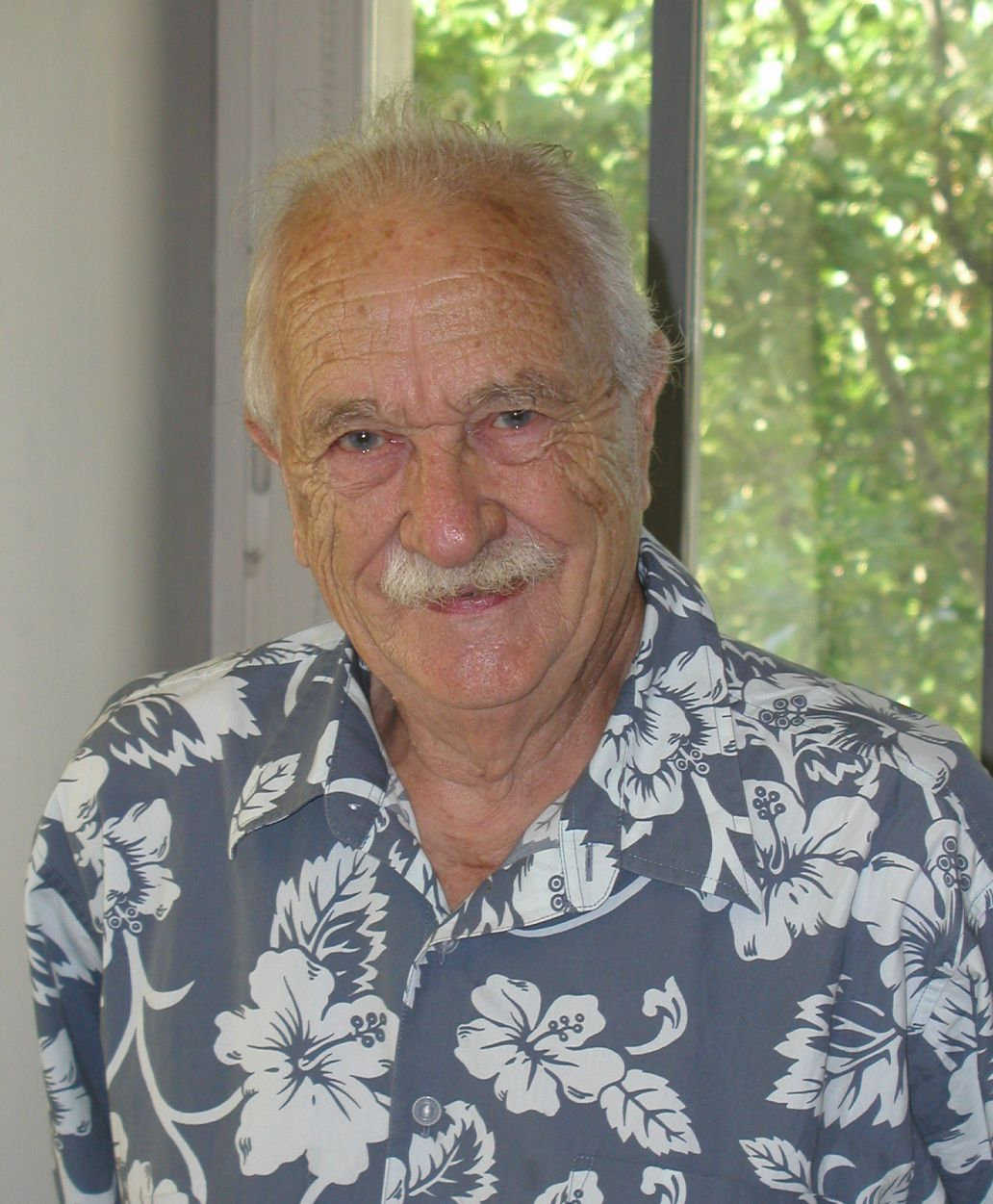
- Brygoo in 2002
- Born: April 22, 1920; Lille, France
- Died: February 8, 2016 (aged 95); Paris, Franc
- Education: École du service de santé des armées de Bordeaux
- Known for: Research on radiation resistance; taxonomy of Malagasy reptiles
- Scientific career
- Fields: Biology, zoology, herpetology, parasitology
- Workplaces: Institut Pasteur; Muséum national d'histoire naturelle

Édouard-Raoul Brygoo (22 April 1920 – 8 February 2016) was a French physician and biologist known for his research on the resistance of living organisms to ionizing radiation. He was also a zoologist and herpetologist who conducted research on parasites and described numerous species of reptiles, particularly chameleons endemic to Madagascar.

== Career ==
Brygoo completed his higher education at the École du service de santé des armées de Bordeaux, graduating with a medical doctorate in 1946. His dissertation, Essai de bromatologie entomologique : les Insectes comestibles (An essay on entomological bromatology: edible insects), examined the nutritional and pharmacological properties of insects.

In 1949, he joined the Institut Pasteur in Paris, where he studied anaerobic bacteria. In 1950, he was assigned to the institute's research centre in Saigon, in what was then the State of Vietnam. In 1954, he was appointed to the Institut Pasteur's research centre in Antananarivo, the capital of Madagascar. He served as its director from 1964 to 1972. In 1974, Brygoo entered the reserve as a medical general. He returned to France the following year and joined the Institut Pasteur's overseas research department as a civilian researcher. He also directed the LERAI, a laboratory studying the resistance of animals to irradiation, at the Muséum national d'histoire naturelle in Paris. In 1977, he was appointed professor of zoology at the museum. From 1978 to 1989, he headed its herpetology laboratory.

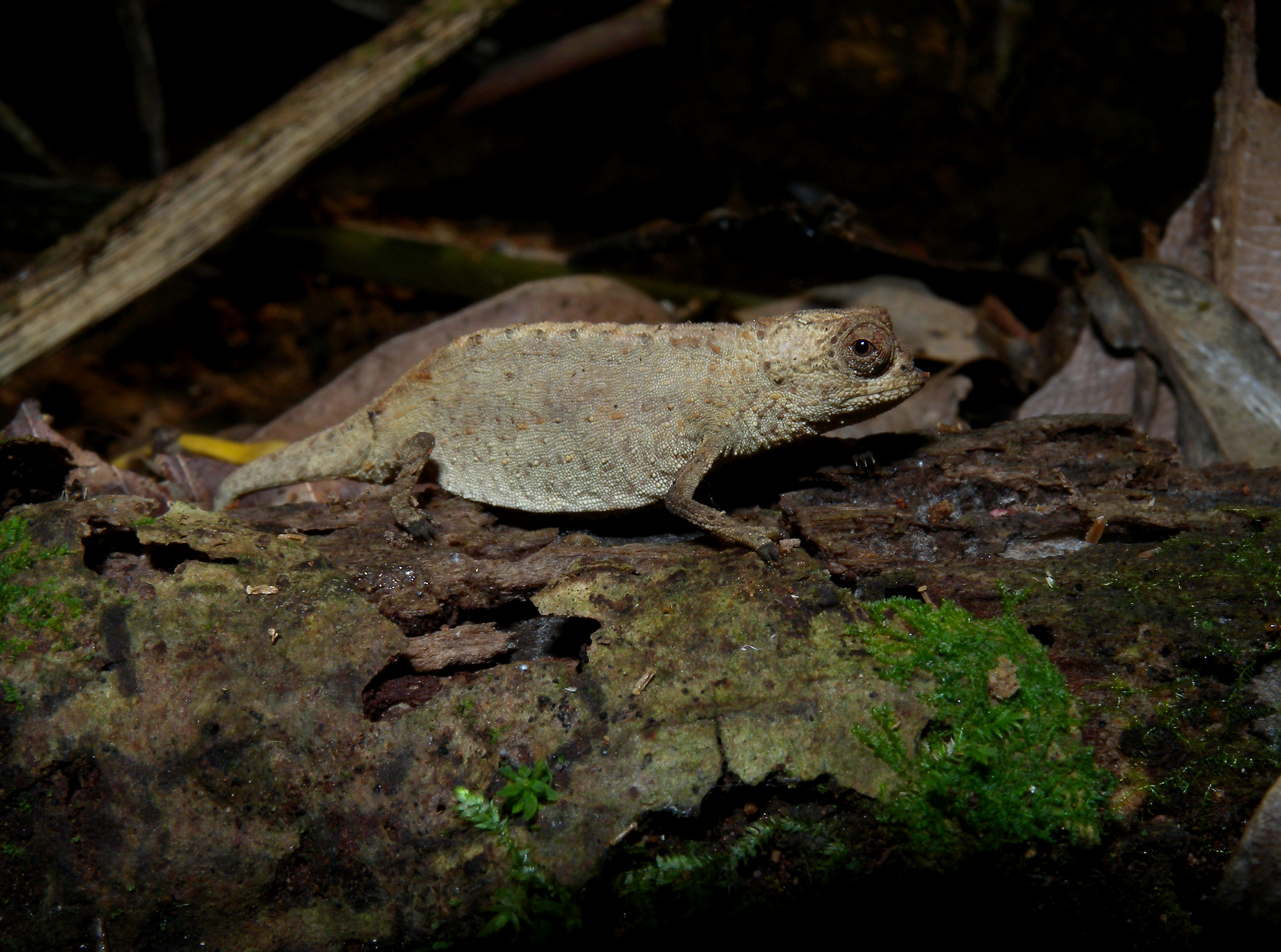
Brookesia peyrierasi, a chameleon described by Brygoo and Charles Domergue in 1974.

Brygoo also became interested in parasitology during the 1950s. Working with Professor Alain Chabaud, he investigated parasite life cycles, particularly those of nematodes. He was an intrepid explorer who travelled to remote and difficult-to-access environments with Charles Blanc and/or Charles Domergue to document biodiversity in poorly studied habitats. In Madagascar, his work with these collaborators contributed to the description of approximately twenty endemic chameleon species. Brygoo died in Paris on 8 February 2016, aged 95.

== Species described by Édouard-Raoul Brygoo ==
The following is a selection of reptile taxa described by Brygoo, often in collaboration with other researchers. The original scientific names and publication titles are retained.

=== Chameleons ===
- Brookesia vadoni (Brygoo & Domergue, 1968)
- Brookesia thieli (Brygoo & Domergue, 1969)
- Brookesia karchei (Brygoo, Blanc & Domergue, 1970)
- Brookesia lambertoni (Brygoo & Domergue, 1970)
- Brookesia therezieni (Brygoo & Domergue, 1970)
- Brookesia antoetrae (Brygoo & Domergue, 1970)
- Brookesia peyrierasi (Brygoo & Domergue, 1974)
- Brookesia betschi (Brygoo, Blanc & Domergue, 1974)
- Brookesia griveaudi (Brygoo, Blanc & Domergue, 1974)
- Calumma tsaratananense (Brygoo & Domergue, 1968)
- Calumma marojezense (Brygoo, Blanc & Domergue, 1970)
- Calumma andringitraense (Brygoo, Blanc & Domergue, 1972)
- Calumma capuroni (Brygoo, Blanc & Domergue, 1972)
- Calumma hilleniusi (Brygoo, Blanc & Domergue, 1973)
- Calumma peyrierasi (Brygoo, Blanc & Domergue, 1974)
- Calumma guillaumeti (Brygoo, Blanc & Domergue, 1974)
- Furcifer petteri (Brygoo & Domergue, 1966)
- Furcifer angeli (Brygoo & Domergue, 1968)
- Furcifer belalandaensis (Brygoo & Domergue, 1970)
- Furcifer tuzetae (Brygoo, Bourgat & Domergue, 1972)
- Palleon nasus (including the subspecies originally described as Palleon nasus pauliani) (Brygoo, Blanc & Domergue, 1972)

=== Skinks ===
- Amphiglossus alluaudi (Brygoo, 1981)
- Amphiglossus tsaratananensis (Brygoo, 1981)
- Melanoseps loveridgei (Brygoo & Roux-Estève, 1982)

=== Gerrhosaurids ===
- Zonosaurus haraldmeieri (Brygoo & Böhme, 1985)

== Species named in honour of Brygoo ==
Several species have been named in honour of Brygoo:

- Brookesia brygooi, a terrestrial chameleon (Raxworthy & Nussbaum, 1995).
- Pyxis arachnoides brygooi, a subspecies of the spider tortoise (Vuillemin & Domergue, 1972).
- Zonosaurus brygooi, a Malagasy plated lizard (Lang & Böhme, 1990).
- Brygophis coulangesi, a lamprophiid snake (Domergue & Bour, 1989).
- Ctenocephalides brygooi, a flea (Beaucournu, 1975).
- Columbicola brygooi, a chewing louse (Tendeiro, 1967).
- Plasmodium brygooi, a protozoan parasite described from a chameleon (Telford & Landau, 1987).
- Caryospora brygooi, a coccidian parasite (Upton, Freed, Burdick & McAllister, 1990).
