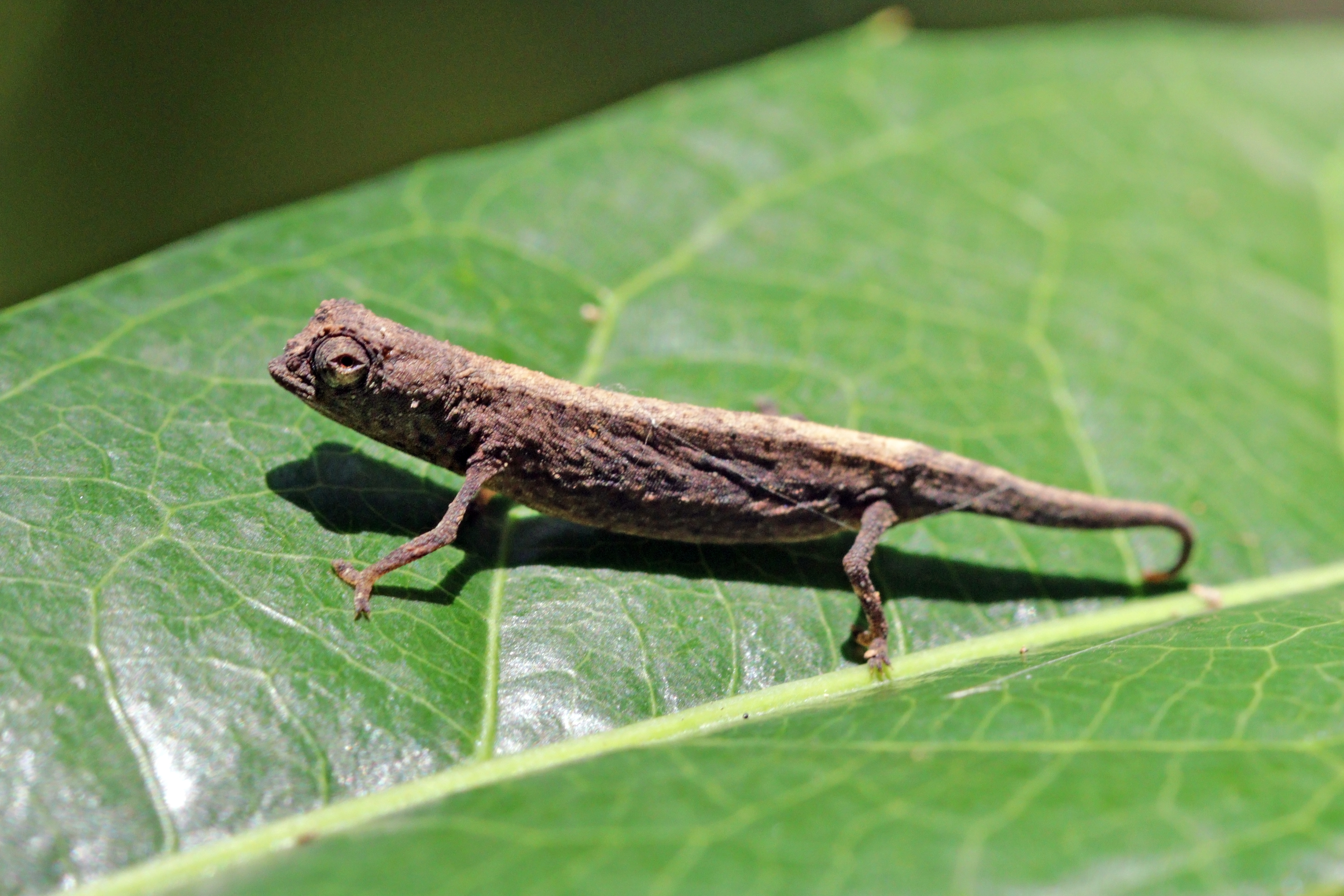
- Lokobe Strict Reserve

Conservation status
- Endangered (IUCN 3.1)

Scientific classification
- Kingdom: Animalia
- Phylum: Chordata
- Class: Reptilia
- Order: Squamata
- Suborder: Iguania
- Family: Chamaeleonidae
- Genus: Brookesia
- Species: B. minima

Binomial name
- Brookesia minima Boettger, 1893
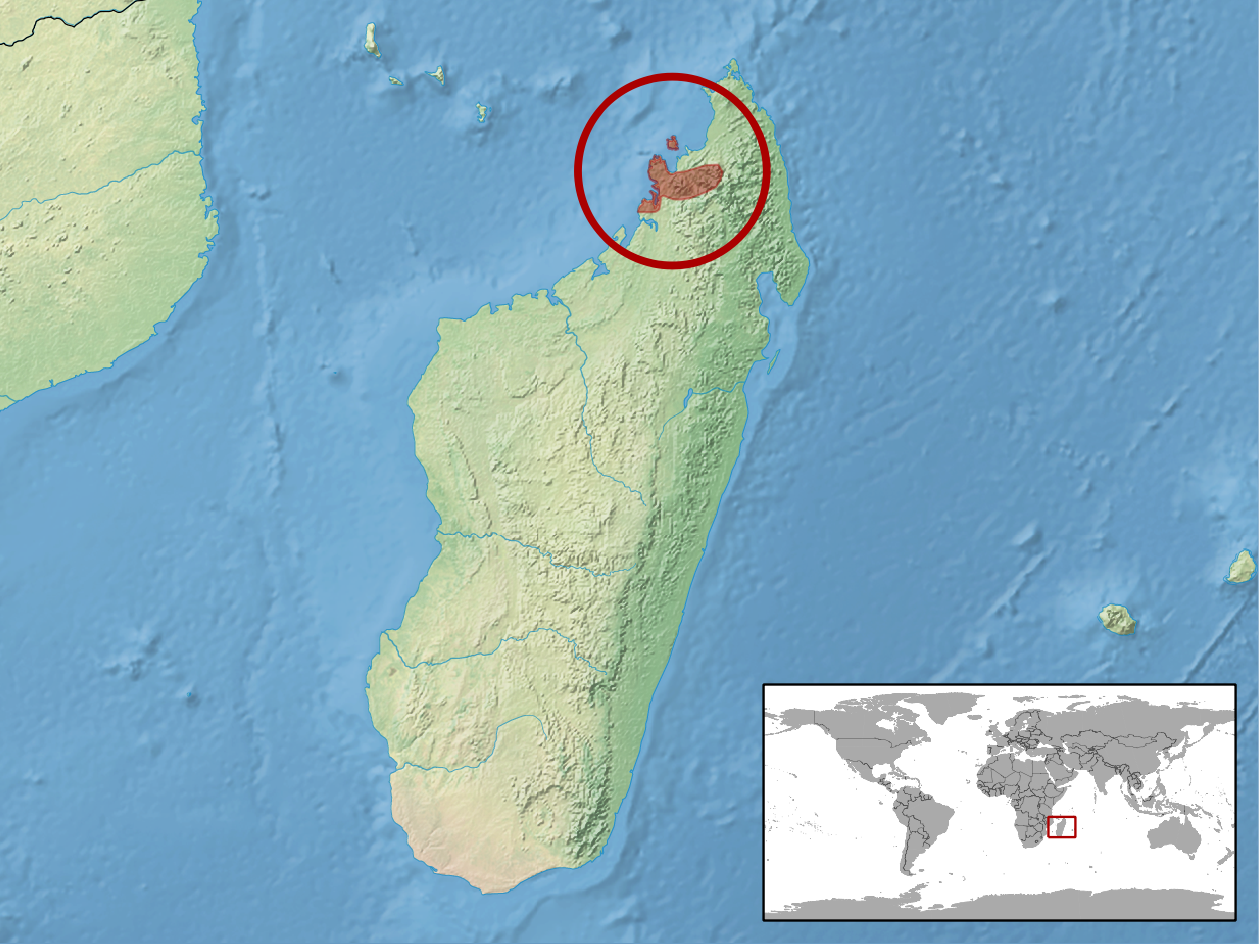

= Brookesia minima =

Species of reptile

Brookesia minima, (common names of which include the dwarf chameleon, the Madagascar dwarf chameleon, the minute leaf chameleon, and the Nosy Be pygmy leaf chameleon), is a diminutive chameleon that was regarded as the smallest lizard of the Chamaeleonidae until a smaller species, Brookesia nana, was described in 2021.

== Range ==
B. minima is endemic to Nosy Be, an island located just off the northwest coast of Madagascar, but has extralimital distribution to Manongarivo Reserve on Madagascar's northwest coast.

== Description ==
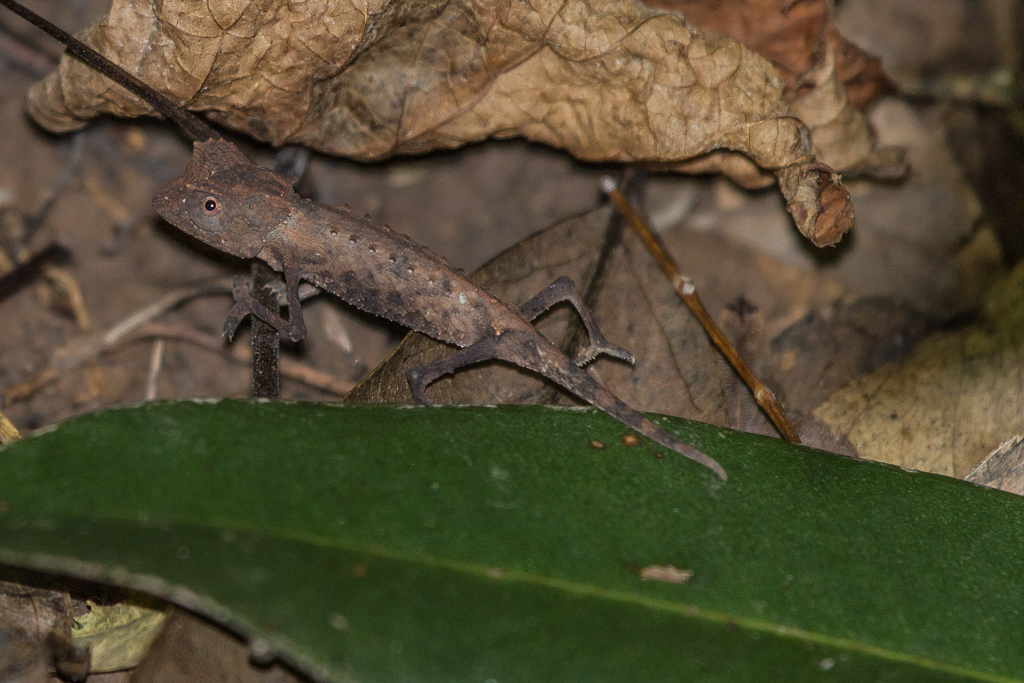

B. minima is the third-smallest lizard ever described. The species has the independently rotating eyes and prehensile tail characteristic of all chameleons. It is coloured light grey on the head, back and tail, although the tail becomes orange then yellowish towards the tip. The sides of the body are brown, occasionally interrupted by dark brown spots, and the limbs are almost entirely dark brown. Spotted patterning appears to be a stress colouration, and unstressed individuals have a more or less uniform dark brown body, apart from a beige area in front of the eyes (1). The B. minima adult has a flattened head and an orbital crest with large scales forming triangular plates above its eyes. Along its back are two rows of granular protrusions. B. minima specimens sometimes have lateral yellow stripes over their basic drab grayish-brown color. The maximum total length is 3.4 cm (1.3 in) for females and 2.8 cm (1.1 in) for males. Males are also slenderer than females, and exhibit a hemipenial bulge at the base of their tails.

== Habitat ==
B. minima is native to the rain forests of its native island. It has a relatively active habit for a chameleon and likes moving around in the low branches and leaf litter of its native rain forests. Though they are moderately aggressive toward one another, population and densities in the wild may approach one animal per square meter.

== Reproduction ==
It is not known how frequently B. minima reproduces, but a typical clutch contains two eggs.

== Similar species ==
B. minima has been characterized as belonging to a species group with other Madagascan dwarf chameleons such as B. dentata, B. tuberculata, B. peyrierasi and other new or unidentified species such as a recently described chameleon from Tsingy de Bemaraha Strict Nature Reserve.

== Photolinks ==
- Brookesia minima images on Flickr

== Bibliography ==
- Klaver, C. & W. Boehme. 1997. Chamaeleonidae. Das Tierreich, 112: i-xiv' 1 - 85. Verlag Walter de Gruyter & Co., Berlin, New York.
- Martin, J., 1992. Masters of Disguise: A Natural History of Chameleons. Facts On File, Inc., New York, NY.
- Necas, P. 1999. Chameleons: Nature's Hidden Jewels. Krieger Publishing Company, Malabar, FL.
