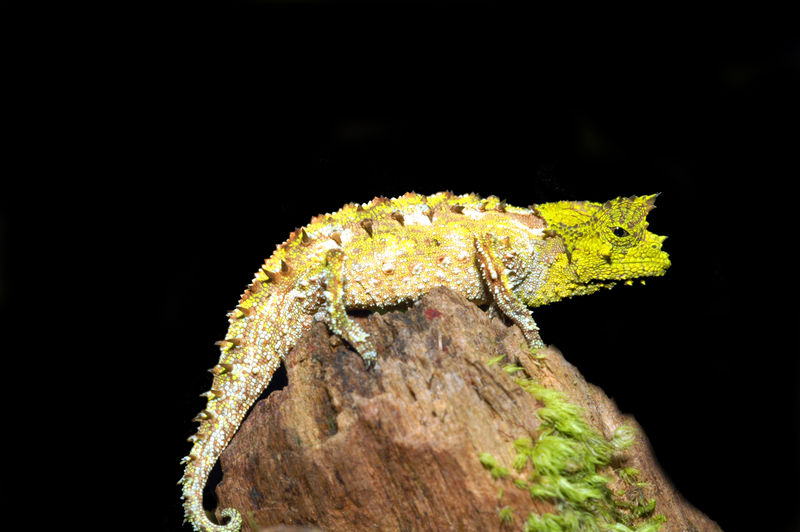

Conservation status
- Vulnerable (IUCN 3.1)

Scientific classification
- Kingdom: Animalia
- Phylum: Chordata
- Class: Reptilia
- Order: Squamata
- Suborder: Iguania
- Family: Chamaeleonidae
- Genus: Brookesia
- Species: B. vadoni

Binomial name
- Brookesia vadoni Brygoo & Domergue, 1968
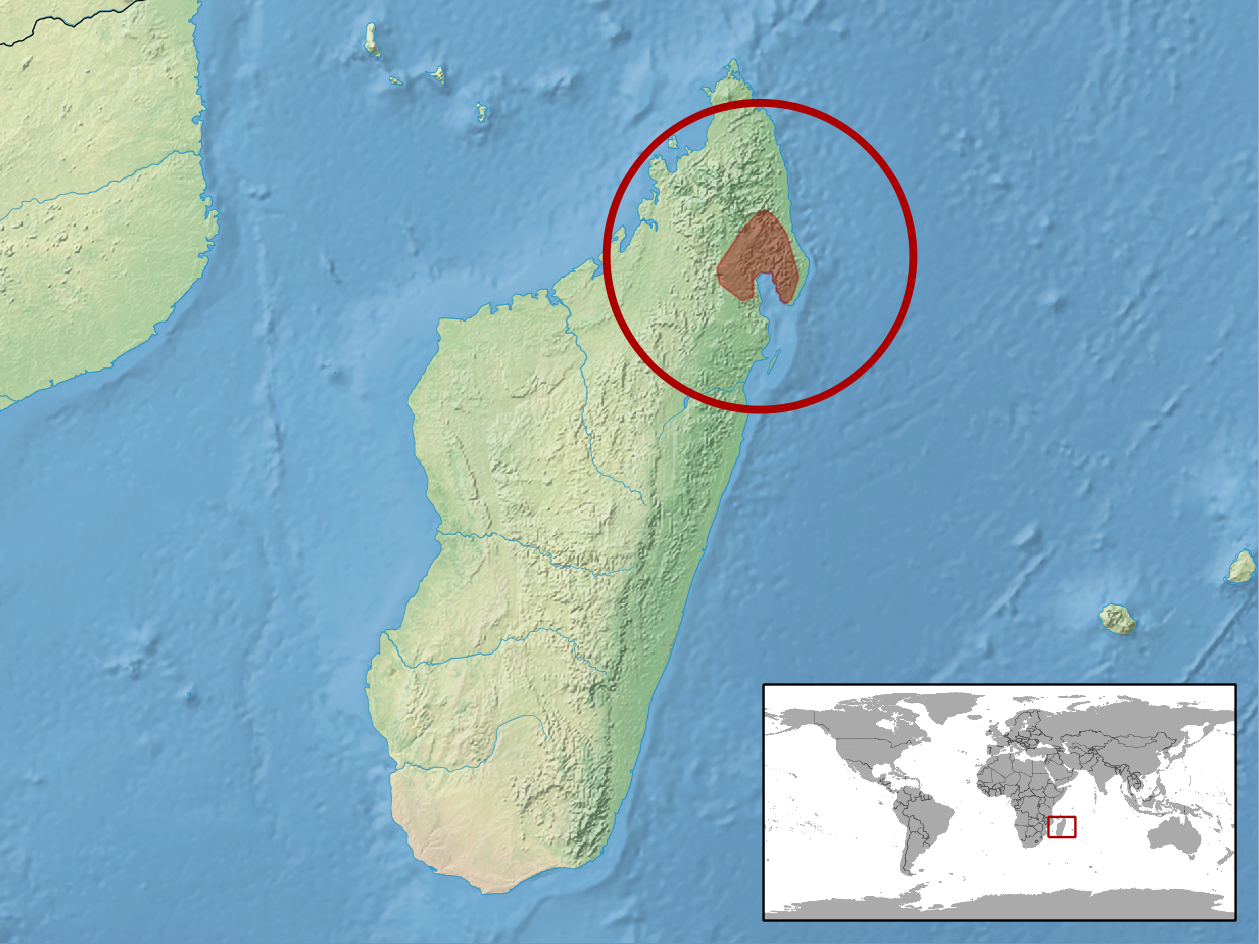

= Iaraka River leaf chameleon =

Species of lizard

The Iaraka River leaf chameleon (Brookesia vadoni), also commonly known as the mossy pygmy leaf chameleon, is a species of chameleon, a lizard in the family Chamaeleonidae. The species is endemic to Madagascar.

== Etymology ==
The specific name, vadoni, is in honor of French naturalist Jean Pierre Léopold Vadon (1904–1970).

== Geographic range ==
B. vadoni is found in northeastern Madagascar.

== Habitat ==
The preferred natural habitat of B. vadoni is forest, at altitudes of 600–2,130 m (1,970–6,990 ft).

== Reproduction ==
B. vadoni is oviparous.
