= Jean-Jacques Petter =

French primatologist

- Born: 3 July 1927; Paris
- Died: 26 May 2002 (aged 74); Paris
- Known for: Lemur studies
- Scientific career
- Fields: Primatology
- Author abbrev. (zoology): Petter

Jean-Jacques Petter (1927–2002) was a French primatologist known for his studies of lemurs and his conservation work in Madagascar.

Petter's observational research of a variety of lemur species at several sites around Madagascar in the late 1950s was among the first studies of lemur ecology and social patterns. Petter was considered one of the leading pioneers in lemur research, publishing much of what he found in his book, Faune de Madagascar, in 1977. He and his wife, Arlette Petter-Rousseaux, were responsible for placing the hairy-eared dwarf lemur in its own genus, Allocebus, in 1967.

In 2006, Petter's sportive lemur (Lepilemur petteri) was named after him in honor of his lemur research. He is considered a leading figure in French primatology, and for his conservation work in Madagascar, he was awarded the WWF Gold Medal by the World Wide Fund for Nature (WWF) in 1981.

A species of Malagasy chameleon, Furcifer petteri, is named in his honor.
