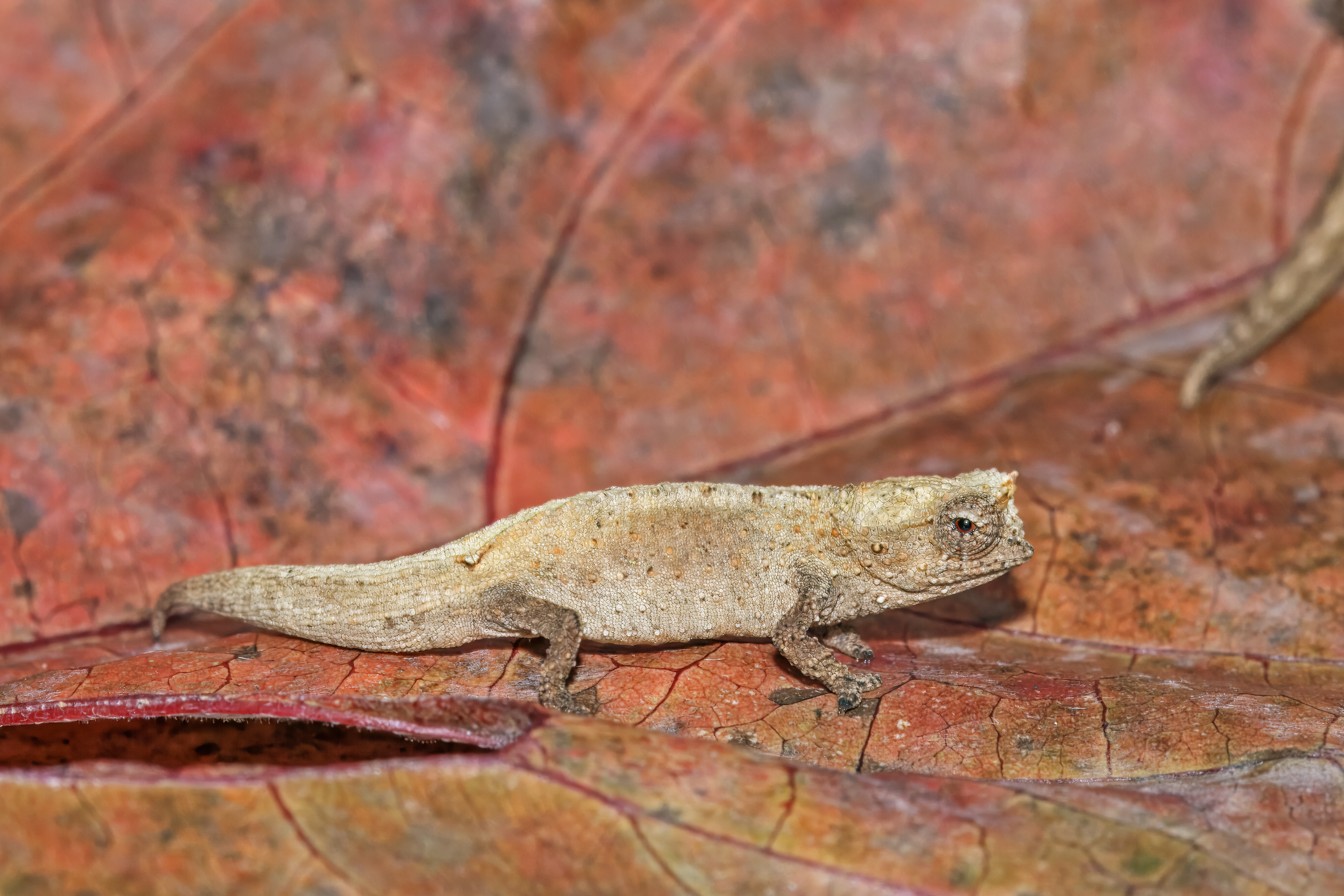
- Male
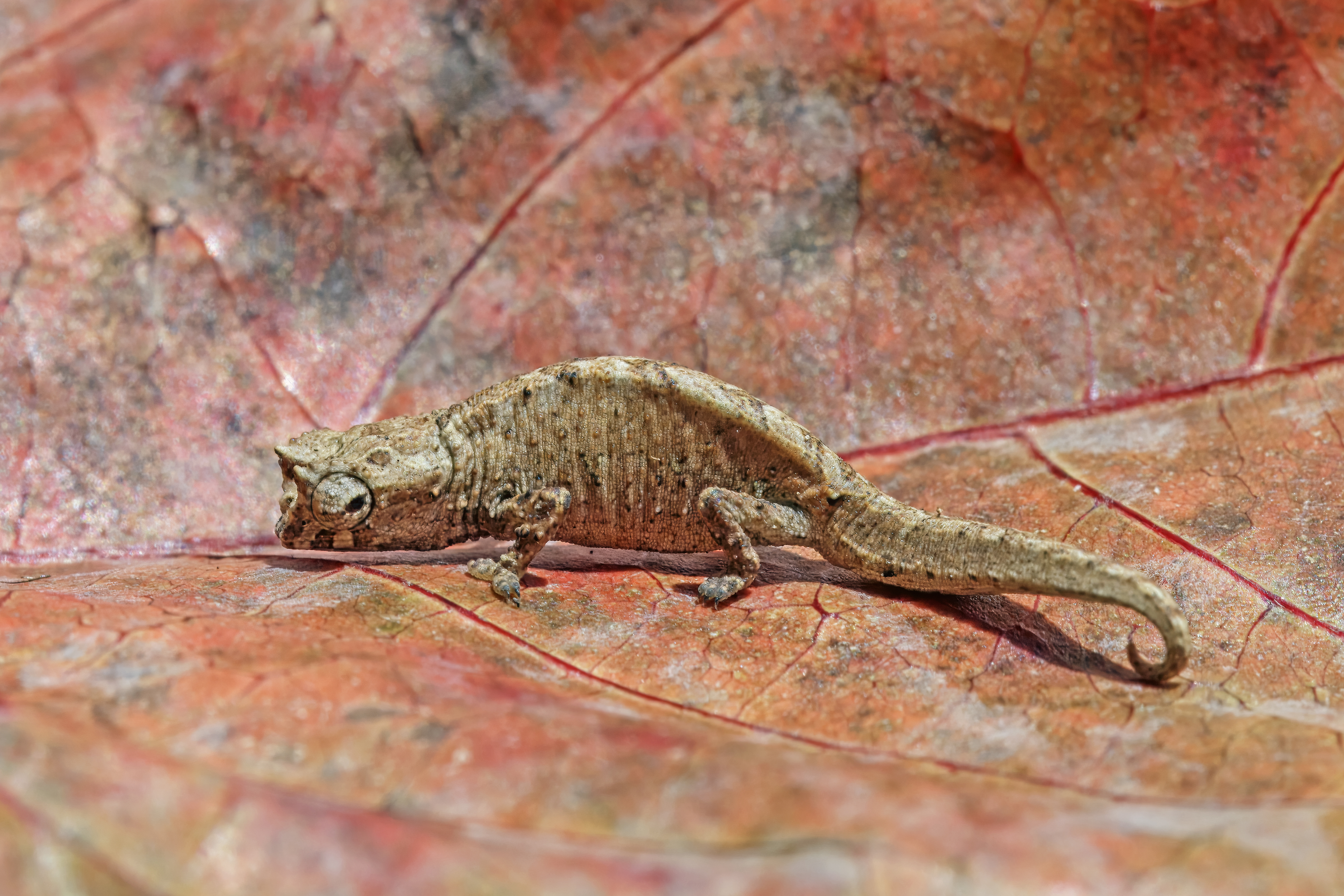
- Female

Conservation status
- Vulnerable (IUCN 3.1)

Scientific classification
- Kingdom: Animalia
- Phylum: Chordata
- Class: Reptilia
- Order: Squamata
- Suborder: Iguania
- Family: Chamaeleonidae
- Genus: Brookesia
- Species: B. tuberculata

Binomial name
- Brookesia tuberculata Mocquard, 1900
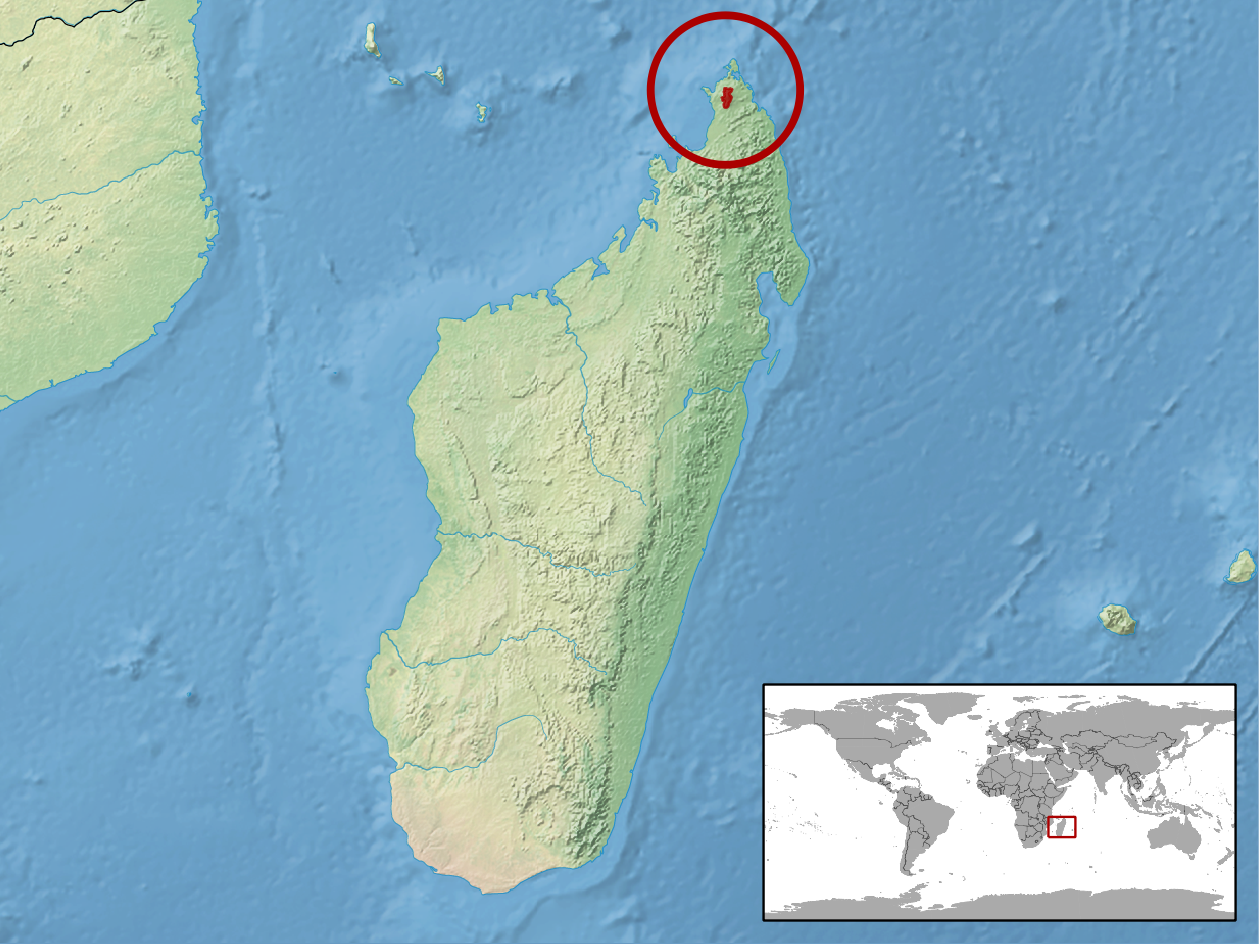

= Mount d'Ambre leaf chameleon =

Species of reptile

The Mount d'Ambre leaf chameleon (Brookesia tuberculata) is a diminutive chameleon from far northern Madagascar.

== Similar species ==
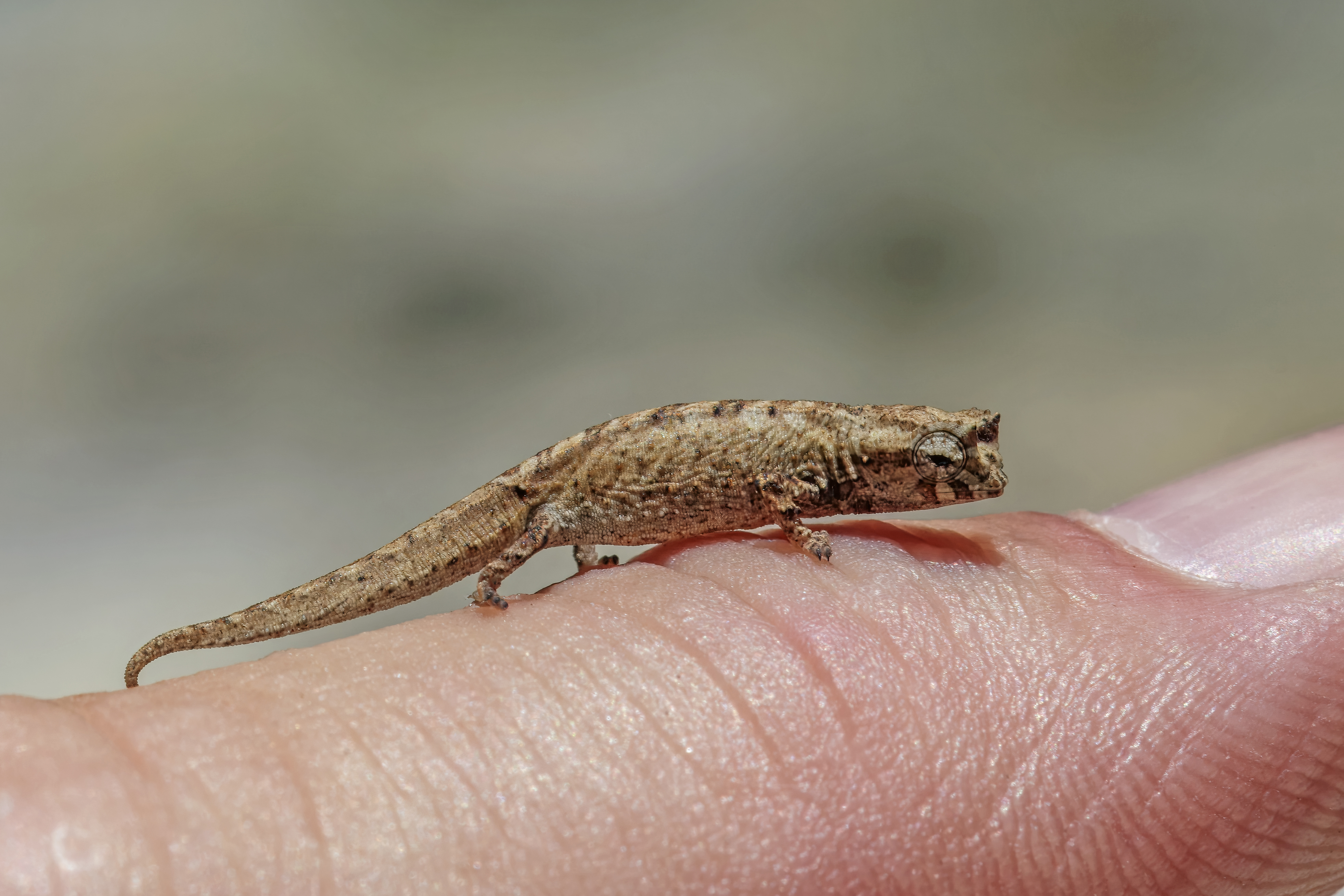
Male on adult male finger

A 1999 paper in the Journal of Zoology disputed a 1995 paper which considered this species and B. peyrierasi to be the same species as B. minima. The later paper discussed the same details as the first – subtle morphological differences in the hemipenises of the respective species and determined they were not conspecific. They also found differences in the arrangement of head crests and in minute spines above the eyes.

== Bibliography ==
- Klaver, C. & W. Boehme. 1997. Chamaeleonidae. Das Tierreich, 112: i-xiv' 1 - 85. Verlag Walter de Gruyter & Co., Berlin, New York.
- Martin, J., 1992. Masters of Disguise: A Natural History of Chameleons. Facts On File, Inc., New York, NY.
- Necas, P. 1999. Chameleons: Nature's Hidden Jewels. Krieger Publishing Company, Malabar, FL.
