= Charles Domergue =

French naturalist, ornithologist, herpetologist, spelunker and geologist

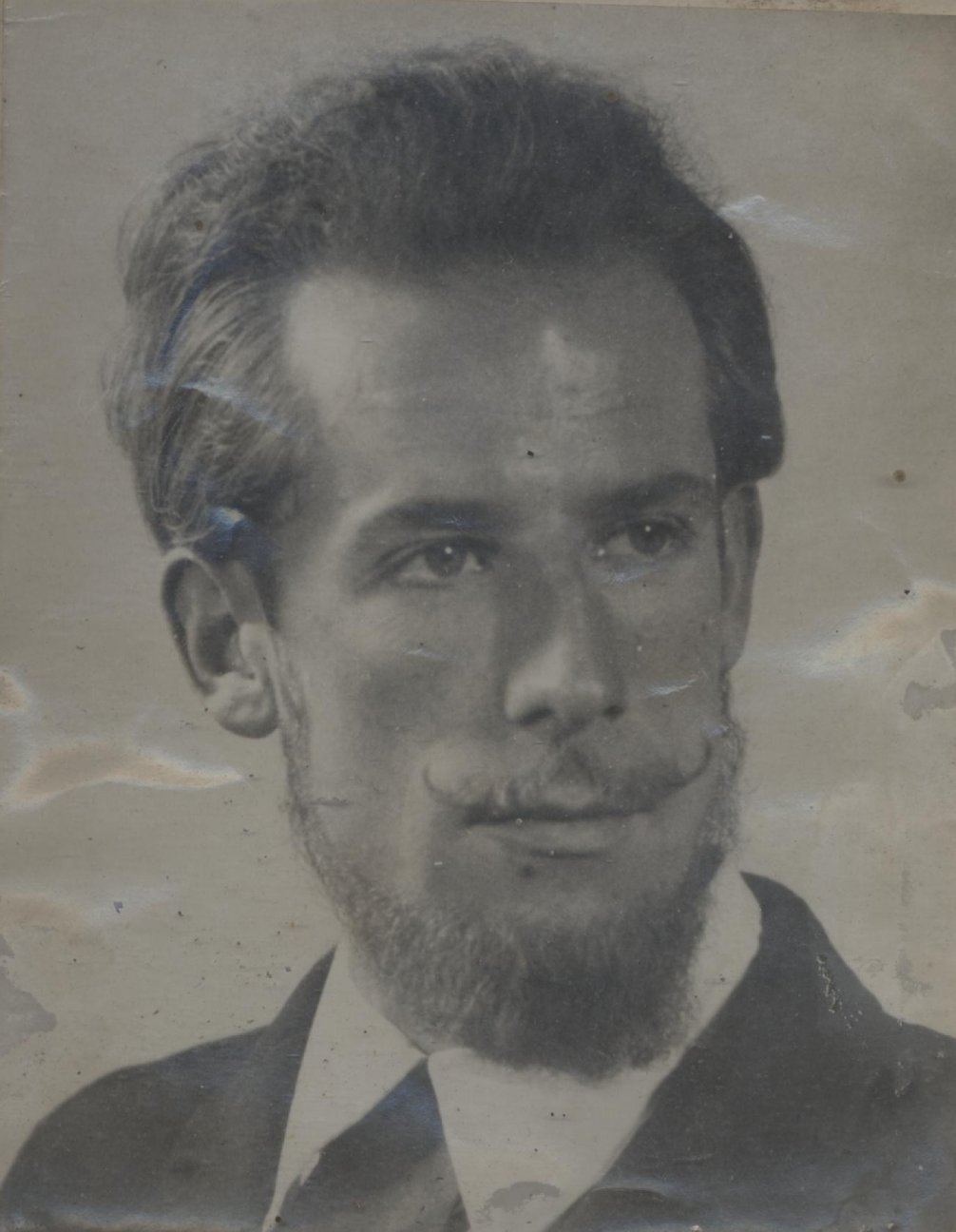

Charles Antoine Domergue (5 January 1914 – 31 December 2008) was a French naturalist, ornithologist, herpetologist, spelunker and geologist who spent much of his life in Madagascar. He also dealt with the effects of pollution.

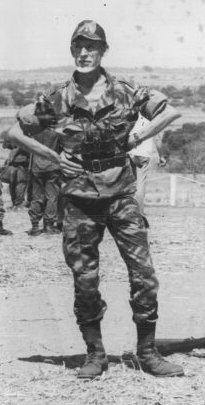
Domergue in 1960

== Eponyms ==
Domergue is commemorated in the scientific name of a species of snake, Madatyphlops domerguei, and a frog, Blommersia domerguei, both of which are endemic to Madagascar.

== Selected publications ==
- 1942: Les serpents de Franche-Comté : Description, habitat, reproduction, venin, chasse, vie en captivité, légendes suivis d'une brève étude des lézards (mit 27 Illustrationen, davon 17 Zeichnungen vom Autor). édition Imprimerie de l'Est (Besançon)
- 1962: Un serpent venimeux à Madagascar : Madagascarophis colubrina. Bull. Acad. malg.
- 1963: Observation sur les hémipénis des ophidiens et sauriens de Madagascar. Bull. Acad. malg., 21–23.
- 1967: Clé simplifiée pour la détermination sur le terrain des serpents communs de Madagascar. Bull. Acad. malg.
- 1970: Notes sur les Serpents de la Région Malgache. Lycodryas maculatus (Günther, 1858), espèce des Comores. Description de deux femelles. Bull. Mus. Nat. Hist. Nat. Paris, 42 : 449–451.
- 1972–1973: II. Étude de trois Serpents malgaches : Liopholidophis lateralis (D. & B.), L. stumpffi (Boettger) et L. thieli n. sp. Bull. Mus. Nat. Hist. Nat. Paris, 77 : 1397–1412.
- 1973: Notes sur les Caméléons de Madagascar.
- 1983: La forêt du PK 32 au nord de Tuléar. Note préliminaire en vue de sa mise en réserve. Bull. Acad. malg., 61 : 105–114
- 1994: Nouvelles espèces du complexe Stenophis et Lycodrias. Bull. Acad. malg. 21 avril.
- 1994: Notes sur les serpents de la région malgache. X. Boïginae nouveaux des genres Stenophis et Lycodrias. Bull. Acad. malg.

== Decorations ==
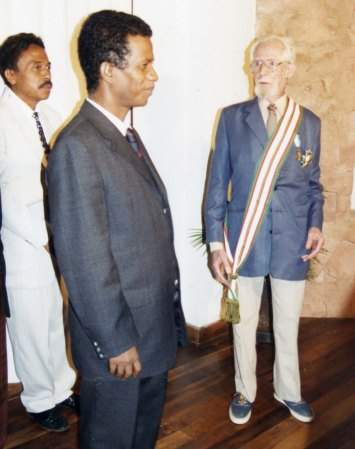
Domergue (right) receiving a Malagasy Order of Merit

- Croix de guerre 1939–1945
- 1946: Médaille de la Résistance
- 1950: Nischan-el-Iftikhar-Orden
- 14 July 1967: Legion of Honour

== Sources ==
- Domergue, Sylvie (2008). "Travelling Through Time - Voyage dans le temps: Charles A. Domergue". Madagascar Conservation & Development 3 (1): 78–83. (in English and French).
