= Crete Mediterranean forests =

Terrestrial ecoregion in Greece

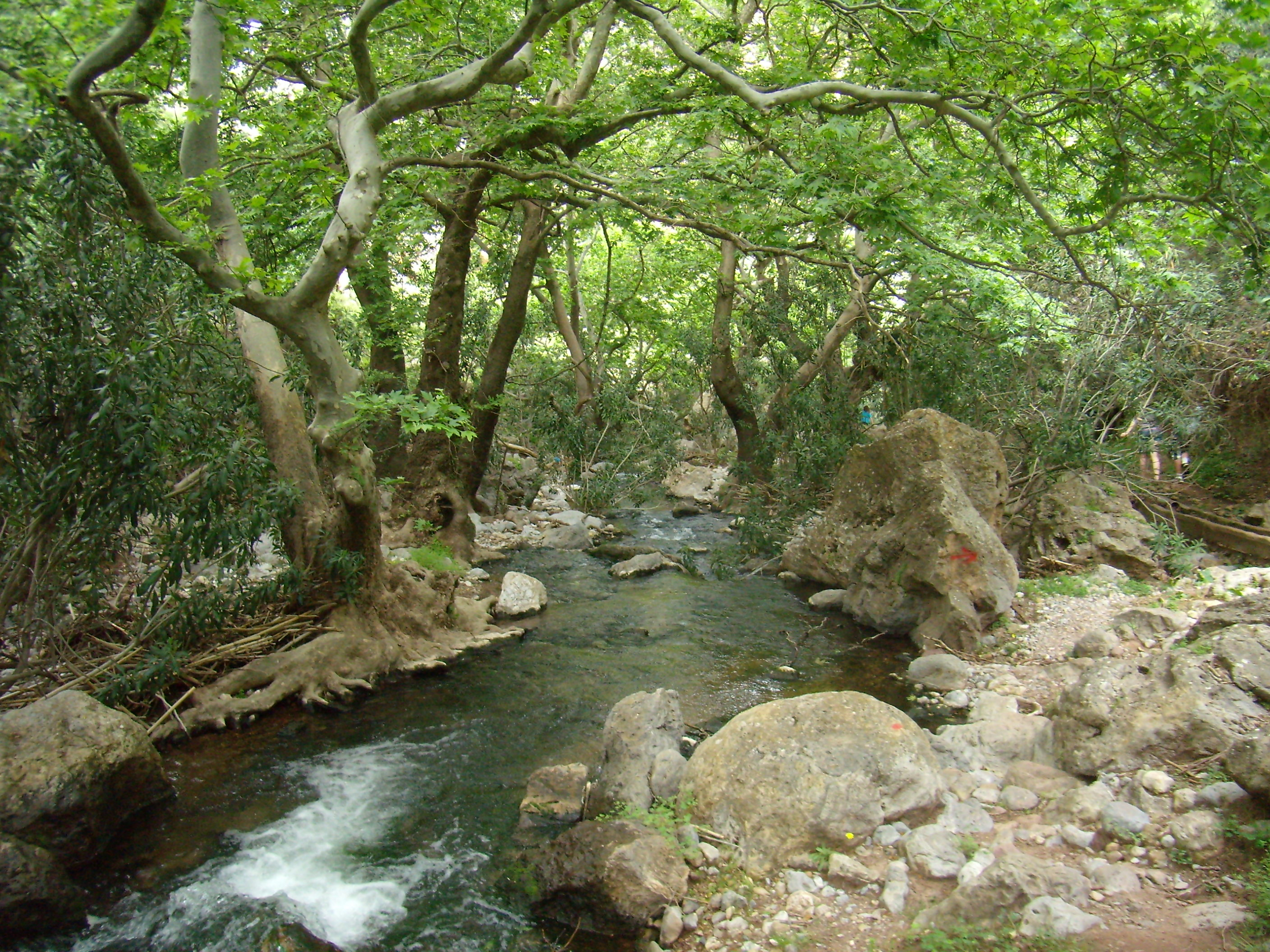
- Streamside forest in Zakros Gorge, Crete

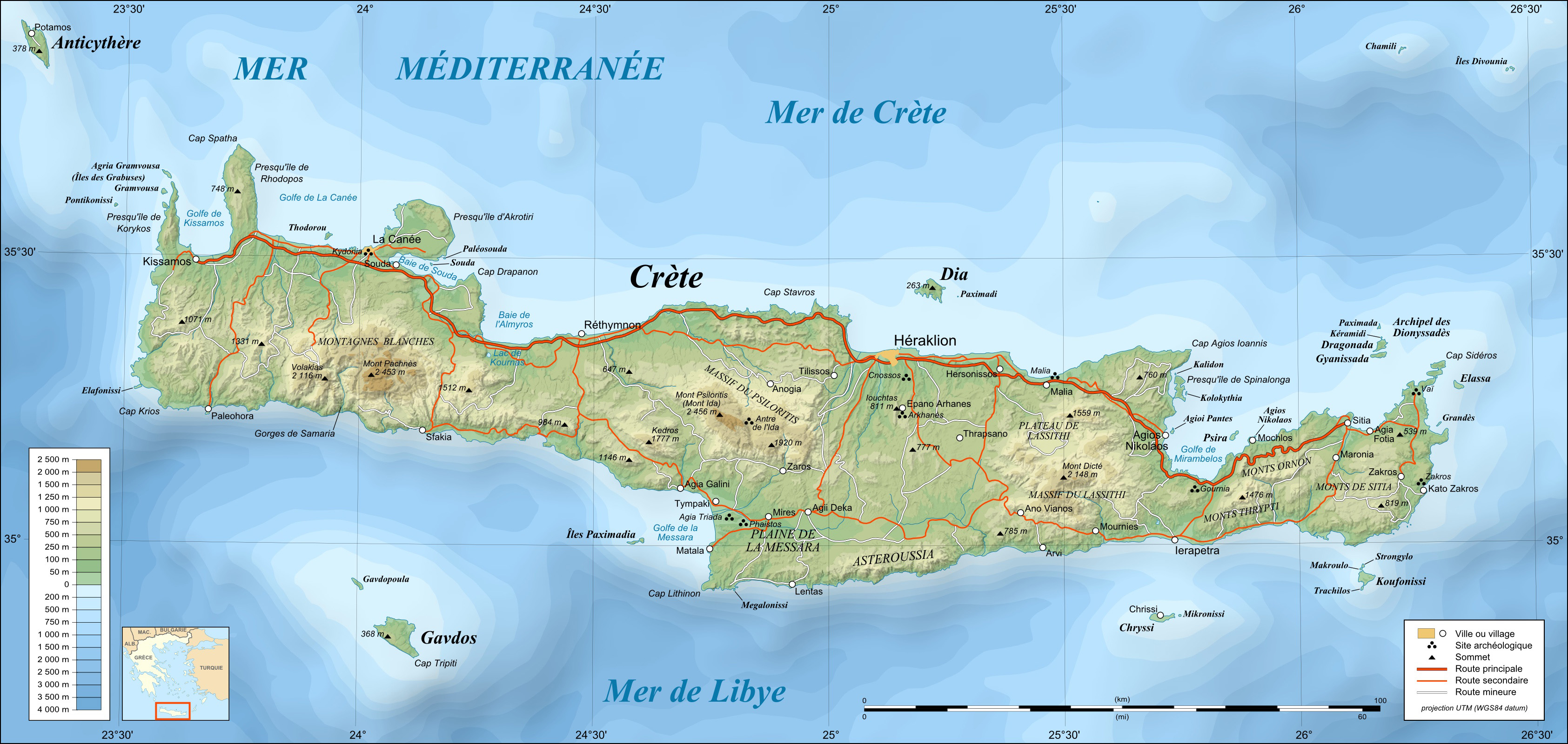
- Topographic map of Crete

Ecology
- Realm: Palearctic
- Biome: Mediterranean forests, woodlands, and scrub

Geography
- Area: 8,450 km^{2} (3,260 sq mi)
- Country: Greece
- Elevation: sea level to 2,456 m

Conservation
- Conservation status: critical/endangered
- Protected: 35.26%

The Crete Mediterranean forests is a terrestrial ecoregion that encompasses the Greek island of Crete.

The island has a Mediterranean climate, and is in the Mediterranean forests, woodlands, and scrub biome found in the lands in and around the Mediterranean Sea. Crete's diverse habitats, from shrublands to forests, sustain 1600 species of plants, including dozens of endemic species. The island was once characterized by forests, but centuries of human habitation have transformed the landscape, converting much of the original forest into shrublands, woodlands, fields, orchards, and pastures.

== Geography ==
Crete lies in the eastern Mediterranean Sea. The Aegean Sea is to the north, and the Libyan Sea is to the south. It is about 160 km south of the Greek mainland. Crete is the largest island in Greece and the fifth-largest island in the Mediterranean, with an area of 8,336 km^{2}.

Crete extends 260 km from east to west, and its north–south width varies from 60 to 12 miles. A mountainous spine extends the length of the island, with three principal ranges: the White Mountains or Lefka Ori in the west (2,454 m), Psiloritis in the center (which includes Mount Ida, Crete's highest point at 2,456 m), and the Dikti Mountains in the east (2,148 m).

Geologically Crete is part of the Hellenic arc, created by the collision of the African and Eurasian tectonic plates starting 11 to 15 million years ago. Seas have divided Crete from the Greek and Anatolian mainlands for at least five million years. Crete's high mountains were uplifted 1.5 million years ago.

== Flora ==
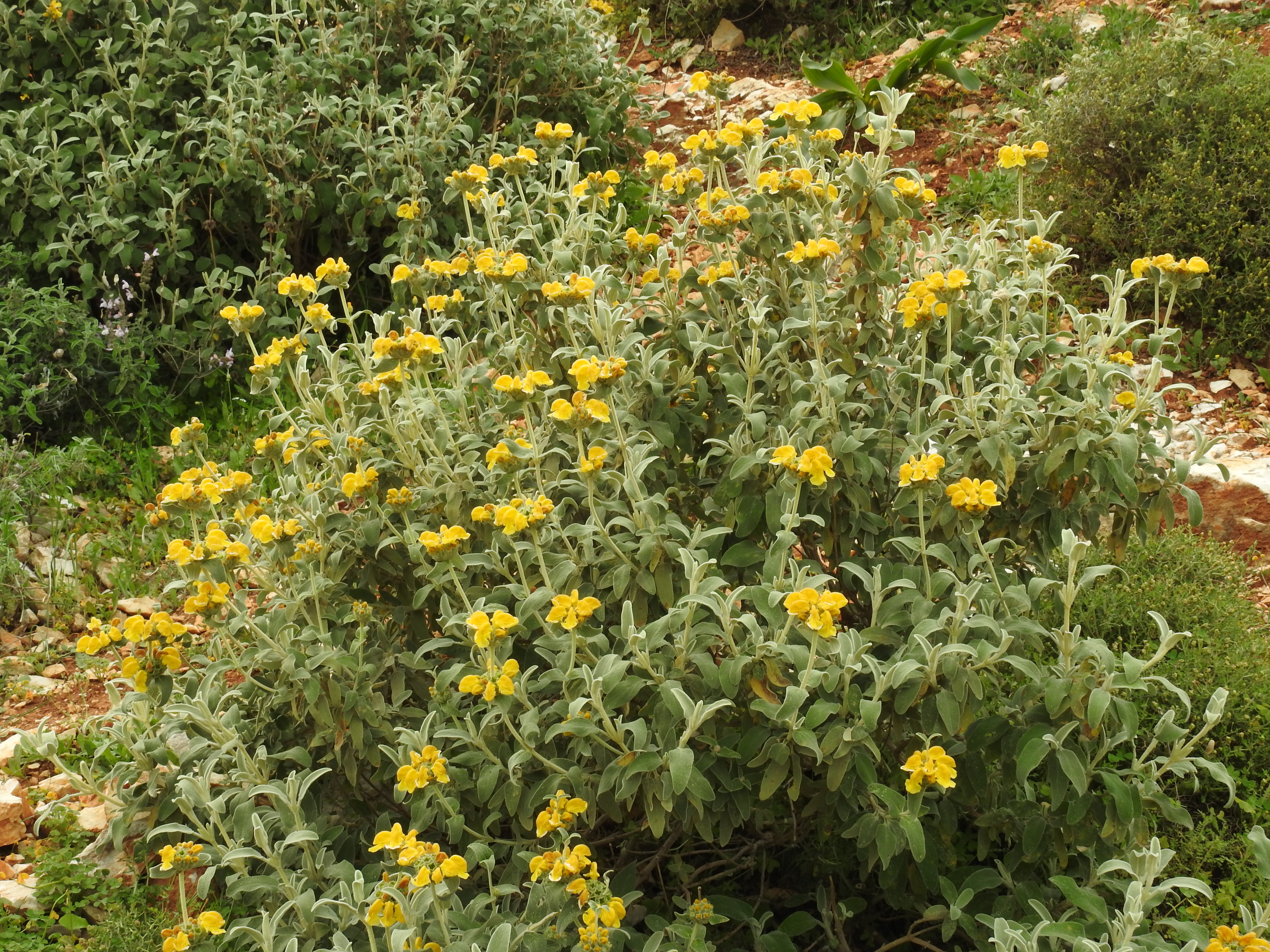
Phlomis fruticosa on Crete.

The island's range of topography and soils support diverse plant communities. At lower elevations, low shrubland (phrygana) is common. Phrygana includes many aromatic plants, and typical species include Sarcopoterium spinosum, Thymus capitatus, Phlomis fruticosa, Phlomis cretica, Phlomis lanata, Cistus spp., Genista acanthoclada, Calicotome villosa, and spurge (Euphorbia spp.). There are also high shrublands (maquis) dominated by carob (Ceratonia siliqua), juniper (Juniperus phoenicea), and tree-spurge (Euphorbia dendroides), and woodlands and forests of evergreen and semi-evergreen oaks (Quercus coccifera and Quercus brachyphylla). Groves of Cretan date palm (Phoenix theophrasti) are found in a few stream gorges around the island.

Woodlands of Calabrian pine (Pinus brutia) and Kermes oak (Quercus coccifera) are found at mid-elevations, along with maquis and phrygana of Berberis cretica, Rhamnus saxatilis, Prunus prostrata, and Satureja spinosa.

Woodlands of Mediterranean cypress (Cupressus sempervirens) and Cretan maple (Acer sempervirens) are found at high elevations. Above the tree line (1600–1800 meters), thorny cushion scrublands grow on the highest peaks.

There are 1,600 plant species on Crete, of which about 10% are endemic.

== Fauna ==
Crete is home to two endemic mammals, the Cretan shrew (Crocidura zimmermanni) and Crete spiny mouse (Acomys minous).

The Kri-kri (Capra aegagrus cretica) is subspecies of feral goat found only in Crete's mountains and on nearby islands.

66 species of terrestrial birds breed on Crete and adjacent islands, belonging to 41 genera. Year-round resident birds include the bearded vulture (Gypaetus barbatus), griffon vulture (Gyps fulvus), golden eagle (Aquila chrysaetos), peregrine falcon (Falco peregrinus), red-billed chough (Pyrrhocorax pyrrhocorax), and chukar partridge (Alectoris chukar), Eurasian scops owl (Otus scops), northern long-eared owl (Asio otus), short-eared owl (Asio flammeus), and tawny owl (Strix aluco). Rüppell's warbler (Curruca ruppeli) breeds on the island in the summer, and winters across the Mediterranean in northeastern Africa.

=== Extinct fauna ===
Crete's long isolation from the mainland made its fauna distinct. Dwarf elephants (Palaeoloxodon chaniensis and P. creutzburgi), the Cretan dwarf hippopotamus (Hippopotamus creutzburgi), Cretan dwarf mammoth (Mammuthus creticus), and Cretan dwarf megacerine (Candiacervus cretensis), a tiny deer, lived on Crete until the end of the Pleistocene epoch. These species are examples of insular dwarfism.

The Cretan owl (Athene cretensis), a giant flightless owl, and the Cretan otter (Lutrogale cretensis) also went extinct at the end of the Pleistocene.

== Protected areas ==
35.26% of the ecoregion is in protected areas. These include the Lefka Ori, Psiloritis, and Dikti Mountains and Samaria Gorge National Park.
