= Grammium =

Grammium or Grammion (Ancient Greek: Γράμμιον), also Gramium or Gramion (Γράμιον), was a town of ancient Crete.

The site of Grammium is unlocated.
