= Asphendou Cave petroglyphs =

Petroglyphs in western Crete

- Asphendou Cave on the island of Crete
- 35°14′07.0″N 24°13′00.6″E
- Type: Cave
- Periods: Upper Palaeolithic-Bronze Age
- Location: Asphendou village, Sfakia, Crete, Greece

Site notes
- Elevation: 740 m (2,430 ft)
- Length: 1.15 m (3.8 ft)
- Width: 0.8 m (2.6 ft)
- Discovered: 1960s
- Management: Local
- Public access: Yes

The small Asphendou Cave in western Crete preserves a number of overlapping petroglyphs on a limestone speleothem that may have been made between the Upper Palaeolithic and the early Bronze Age. The oldest of these, that possibly dates from the Upper Palaeolithic, depicts a number of quadrupeds which may represent extinct Candiacervus deer. Overlapping some of these are a layer of paddle-shaped carvings. Patterns formed from rock cupules were added at some later point, likely around the end of the Neolithic or start of the Bronze Age. The final layer mostly consists of a few boats.

When first researched in the 1960s, the identification of the quadrupeds was uncertain. It was thought they might be kri-kri goats and date from the Bronze Age. A reanalysis in 2018 was able to clearly map the different layers, and draw on knowledge of Candiacervus that post-dated the petroglyphs' discovery to date the oldest layer to somewhere within the Late Pleistocene or Upper Palaeolithic. This dating would make the quadrupeds the first known figural art from Crete, and from all Greece, to pre-date the Neolithic period.

== Location ==
The petroglyphs were carved in Asphendou Cave (Σπήλαιο Ασφένδου), also called Skordolakkia (Σκορδαλάκια/Σχορδολάχχια/Ασχορδόλαχια), (35°14′07.0″ N 24°13′00.6″E), which lies about 720 metres (2,360 ft) above sea level in the White Mountains of western Crete, a Mediterranean island now part of Greece. Asphendou village, where the cave is found, is within the Sfakia administrative area. The cave is about 600 metres (2,000 ft) southeast of the centre of the village, and is located near the start of a gorge that stretches south towards the coast, about two hours walk away.

The area around the cave is a karst landscape, with Jurassic limestone lining the southern slopes of the White Mountains. The entrance to the cave is south-facing. A 1972 report notes the entrance is 6.25 metres (20.5 ft) wide and 2.10 metres (6.9 ft) tall, while a 2018 study recorded 8.5 metres (28 ft) by 3.5 metres (11 ft) and 0.6 metres (2.0 ft) high. Either way, the size makes the 'cave' perhaps better described as a shelter. Rubble at the cave entrance suggests the cave may have experienced a roof collapse, meaning it could have been larger at the time the petroglyphs were made. Past the entrance the cave shrinks to a cavern 8.50 metres (27.9 ft) deep that is 3.50 metres (11.5 ft) wide with height ranging from 2.50 metres (8.2 ft) to 0.35 metres (1.1 ft). The interior of the cave has a number of limestone rocks. At its current size, Asphendou Cave is only large enough for two people.

Pottery shards that resemble Minoan pottery have been found in the area around the cave. The site may have been sacred to locals in the second millennium BC, as other caves nearby are thought to have been at that time. The cave entrance has been covered by a locked gate, the key of which is kept by someone in the village.

Crete has been separated from the mainland for at least 5 million years. Other caves in southwest Crete and the nearby island of Gavdos have Palaeolithic artefacts, although all other known artefacts are portable objects. Palaeolithic art has however been found in caves elsewhere around the Mediterranean.

== Carvings ==
The petroglyphs are carved into a crystalline limestone speleothem which sits on the cave floor. In total, the carvings stretch across around 1.15 metres (3.8 ft) by 0.8 metres (2.6 ft) (or 0.78 metres (2.6 ft)) of the slightly-sloped top of this rock. In the middle of this area is a large irregular hole. It is possible the original carvings covered a larger area, with some figures on the edges possibly incomplete due to later damage. There is modern graffiti nearby dated 1959, which includes the initials of local shepherds.

The figures include both geometric shapes and figural art. It is likely that different petroglyphs were carved at different periods, as they are carved to different depths and therefore were likely made from different tools, and some overlap. The rock they are carved into is soft, and many carvings are very shallow. The carvings may have been made with black quartzite, an abundant material in the region which is hard enough to cut into limestone. Obsidian tools have also been found in nearby areas. Research published in 2018 identified the oldest layer of petroglyphs as possibly Palaeolithic, which would make it the oldest known art found in all of Greece. The next oldest known carvings are from the Neolithic.

There are at least four distinct layers of carvings. The highest layer depicts multiple boats as well as a shape described as a "starburst". While it is the most recent layer, it is the most deeply carved into the rock. The second layer is made up of rock cupules, similar to those which have been found elsewhere on Crete as well as on Andros and Naxos. These cupules were made during either the late Neolithic or the Early Bronze Age, somewhere between 5500 and 4700 years ago. The around 575 cupules are carved in 70 groups of 2 to 36 holes, with each hole measuring 1–5 millimetres (0.039–0.197 in) in depth and width. All of the groupings are different, and they may represent various animals, plants, and inanimate objects.

The bottom two layers consist of 17 paddle-shaped carvings and 37 quadrupeds respectively. These are likely linked, as the paddle-shapes are all drawn crossing through quadruped carvings. The quadrupeds are depicted in profile except for the heads, which are effectively in three-quarter view as two antlers are shown on each animal. This is similar to other Palaeolithic depictions of quadrupeds. As the antlers are straight and non-branching, the herd depicted may be Candiacervus deer, a genus which had eight species endemic to Crete but went extinct six thousand years before the beginning of the Bronze Age. Each quadruped carving is about 5 centimetres (2.0 in) long. The quadrupeds are depicted facing a number of different directions, possibly resembling scattering from hunters. Some may represent animals mating. A single engraving of what may be a bow and arrow is not clearly associated with any of the layers. The 2018 study tentatively associated it with the older carvings.

== Discovery and research ==
The petroglyphs were brought to research attention in the 1960s. The Chania Prefecture Office of Tourism became aware of the carvings on 7 September 1962, and the Hellenic Speleological Society became aware of them on 3 October 1962. Information was published in a Chania journal on 14 March 1963, and further research was published in 1971. There was early debate on whether the carvings were from the Palaeolithic (at least 11,000 years old) or the Bronze Age (3000–5000 years old). The reporting on the initial discovery did not have the ability to clearly distinguish the different layers. Reanalysis with new photogrammetric technology in 2018 provided a clearer understanding of the carvings, and analysis was also informed by other research that had taken place elsewhere on Crete since the initial research was carried out.

The carved quadrupeds had long and relatively straight horns that resembled those of Candiacervus ropalophorus

Some of the carved images depicted quadrupeds with what appeared to be long straight horns above their head, which were not identified during initial research. Later discoveries of more intact fossils of the eight known species of Candiacervus deer, thought to have been endemic to Crete, in caves along the island's northern coast provided clearer possible identities for the carvings. Fossils of Candiacervus ropalophorus, which inhabited the island from the Middle to Late Pleistocene, have been found showing long and unbranched horns. The only other species known from the island with somewhat straight horns are the kri-kri goats, which were introduced only 9,000 years ago. This was one of the potential identities of the quadrupeds proposed by the research carried out in the 1970s, before the additional fossil discoveries were made. There is also no depiction of the ground in the carvings, despite such a depiction being common in Bronze Age Minoan art of kri-kri. The identification of the quadrupeds as Candiacervus puts a limit on how recent the carvings can be, with the genus going extinct around 21,500 years ago.

The Asphendou Cave petroglyphs thus may extend backwards the date of the first human settlement in Crete, which was formerly thought to have been Neolithic. Other recent research has found Palaeolithic artefacts in different locations within Crete and the Aegean Sea, and the palaeolithic period of the region remains an active area of study.

== See also ==
- Neolithic Crete
- Neolithic Europe
- Pelasgians
- Prehistory of Southeastern Europe
