= Hippocoronium =

Hippocoronium or Hippokoronion (Ancient Greek: Ἱπποκορώνιον) was a town of ancient Crete.

The site of Hippocoronium is unlocated; however, the mountain of the same name is tentatively identified with modern Mt. Drapanokephala.
