= Inachorium =

City in ancient Crete

Coordinates: 35°21′32″N 23°35′38″E

Inachorium or Ina Chorion (Ancient Greek: Ἰναχώριον) was a city in the western part of ancient Crete.

The site of Inachorium is tentatively located near modern Vathi (formerly Kouneni).
