= Osmida =

Osmida (Ancient Greek: Ὀσμίδα) was a town and a district of ancient Crete. Its site is not located exactly, but it has been suggested to be near Monopari.
