= Pannona =

Coordinates: 35°08′49″N 25°02′10″E

Pannona (Ancient Greek: Πάννονα) was a town in the interior of ancient Crete, south of Knossos.

Its site is tentatively located near modern Agios Thomas.
