= Ampelus (Crete) =

Coordinates: 35°02′06″N 26°12′53″E

Ampelus (Latin) or Ampelos (Ancient Greek: Ἄμπελος, lit. "Vine") was a town in the southeast extremity of ancient Crete, on a cape of the same name.

Its site is tentatively located near Farmakokefalo.
