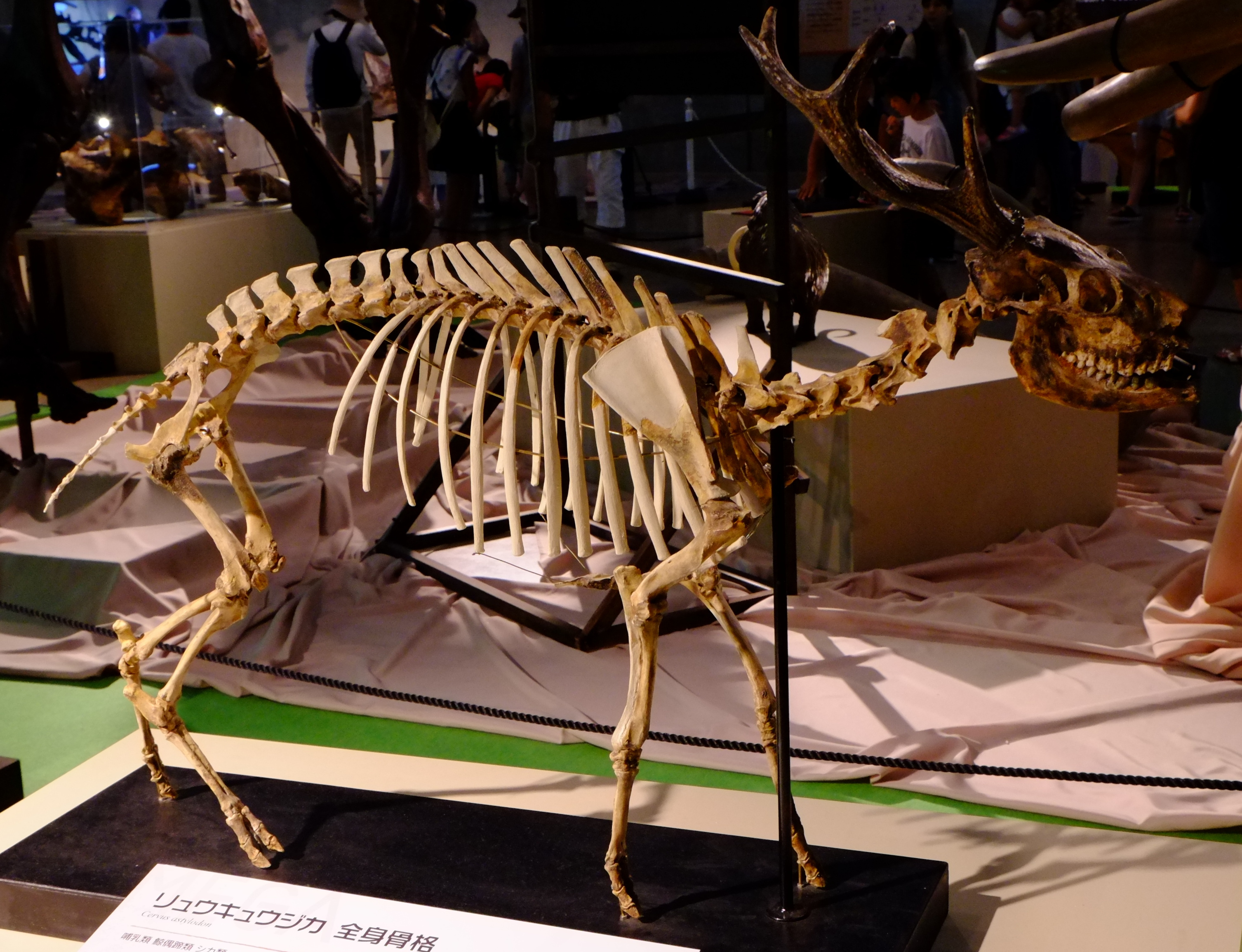
- Skeleton of C. astylodon

Scientific classification
- Kingdom: Animalia
- Phylum: Chordata
- Class: Mammalia
- Order: Artiodactyla
- Family: Cervidae
- Genus: Cervus
- Species: †C. astylodon

Binomial name
- †Cervus astylodon (Matsumoto, 1926)

Synonyms
- Muntiacus astylodon

= Cervus astylodon =

Cervus astylodon Temporal range: 2–0.02 Ma Early - Late Pleistocene

Extinct species of deer

Cervus astylodon, the Ryukyu dwarf deer, is an extinct species of dwarf deer that was endemic to the Ryukyu Islands of Okinawa, Ishigaki, Kume and Tokunoshima. It lived throughout the Pleistocene, becoming extinct towards the end of the Late Pleistocene, following the arrival of humans to the Ryukyu Islands.

== Taxonomy and evolution ==
It was described by Hikoshichiro Matsumoto in 1926 and originally classified as a species of muntjac.

Recently discovered Early Pleistocene remains assigned to C. astylodon show it to be much larger than the Late Pleistocene forms, showing this species went through a gradual dwarfing process. The ancestral C. astylodon may have arrived on the Ryukyu islands from northern China.

== Description ==
The Ryukyu dwarf deer was a very small species, standing only 50 cm (20 in) tall. It exhibits morphological characteristics that are considered typical of insular dwarf cervids, such as small body size, shortened limbs, and hypsodont (high-crowned) molars. The antlers were generally very small, flattened and strongly grooved, with brow-tines that branch off from the very base of the antlers.

The Ryukyu dwarf deer shows four distinct morphotypes based on each of the four islands it inhabits. In Kume, the metacarpal bones are more slender than other forms, while those from Ishigaki have a thicker, stouter shaft. The deer from Okinawa and Tokunoshima are intermediate in metacarpal thickness; both those forms show differences with each other in the shape of the proximal metacarpal canal.

== Diet ==
The Ryukyu dwarf deer was originally thought to be a browser. Using mesowear analysis, its teeth were shown to have sharp cusps with high profiles, which implied a significant amount of browse in diets; deer with a more abrasive diet tend to have more rounded lower-profile cusps.

However, a 2021 study using dental microwear texture analysis indicated that the Ryukyu dwarf deer was a mixed-feeder or grazer instead. Deer with a higher consumption of graminoids show rougher tooth surfaces than those browsing on trees owing to the high content of abrasive silica in graminoid leaves. A comparison of C. astylodon from two different sites (Hananda-Gama Cave site and the Yamashita-cho Cave I site) show a different amount of wear, indicating a variable diet.

== Ecology ==
The islands on which Cervus atylodon lived exhibited a depauperate fauna, with the only other large mammal being present on the islands being another indeterminate similarly sized muntjac deer, with large carnivores being absent. Dental wear analysis suggests that the species had a long lifespan, up to 18-25 years, with low levels of juvenile and adolescent mortality.

== Extinction ==
The Ryukyu dwarf deer went extinct towards the end of the Pleistocene. The timing of extinction for the species has been suggested to be 32,000–24,000 years Before Present. Humans are first believed to have arrived on Okinawa around 30-35,000 years ago. Human hunting may have been a factor in its extinction, possibly in combination with environmental degradation due to the onset of the Last Glacial Maximum, thought the severity of environmental effects of the LGM on the Ryukyu Islands has been questioned.

== See also ==
- Candiacervus - dwarf deer from Crete
- Praemegaceros cazioti - dwarf deer from Sardinia
