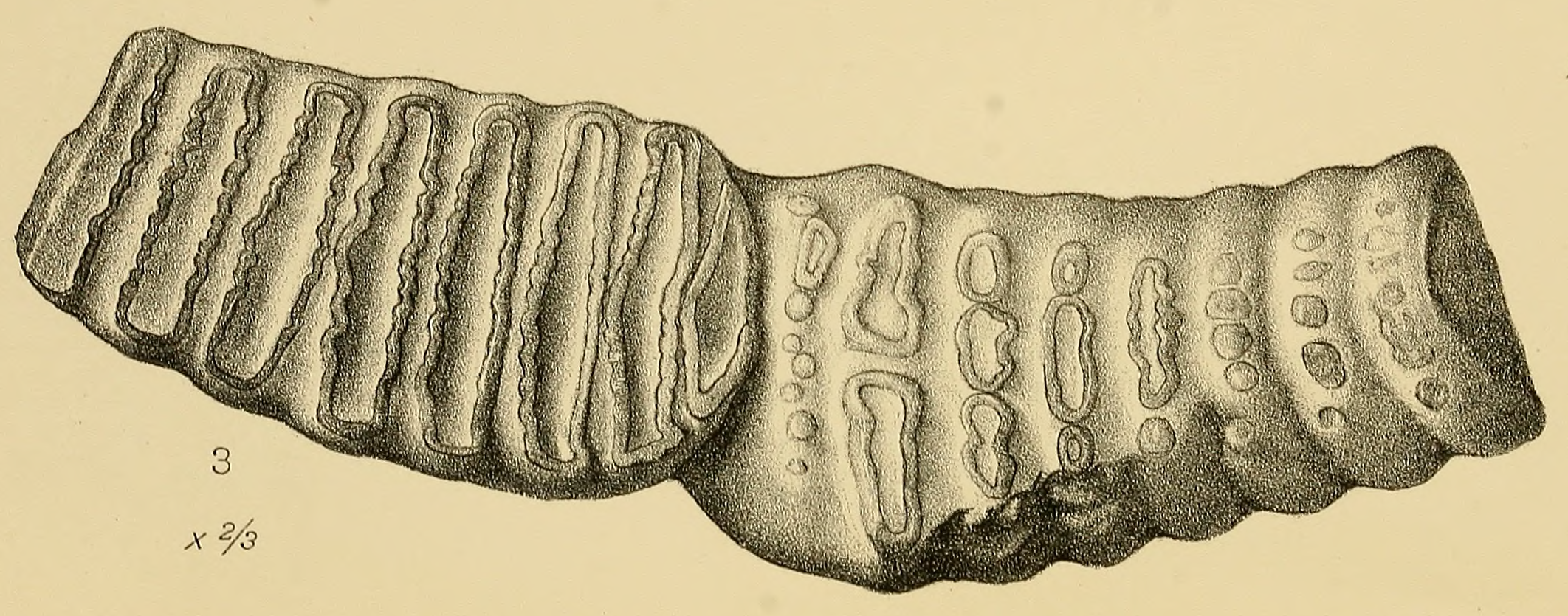
- Drawing of molar teeth

Scientific classification
- Kingdom: Animalia
- Phylum: Chordata
- Class: Mammalia
- Infraclass: Placentalia
- Order: Proboscidea
- Family: Elephantidae
- Genus: †Palaeoloxodon
- Species: †P. creutzburgi

Binomial name
- †Palaeoloxodon creutzburgi Kuss 1965

Synonyms
- Palaeoloxodon chaniensis Symeonidis et al., 2001; Loxodonta creutzburgi; Elephas creutzburgi

= Palaeoloxodon creutzburgi =

Palaeoloxodon creutzburgi Temporal range: Middle-Late Pleistocene

Extinct species of elephant found on Crete

Palaeoloxodon creutzburgi is an extinct species of elephant known from fossil found on the island Crete. It is a descendant of the large mainland straight-tusked elephant (Palaeoloxodon antiquus). It is known from localities across the island, though known material is fragmentary. P. chaniensis from Stylos and in Vamos cave, Chania, west Crete is considered to be a junior synonym of P. creutzburgi. It had undergone insular dwarfism, being approximately 40% of the size of its mainland ancestor, and was around the size of the living Asian elephant, with an estimated body mass of around 3,000 kilograms (6,600 lb). Like its ancestor, it was probably a generalist feeder. It lived during the Middle-Late Pleistocene, alongside the radiation of Candiacervus deer endemic to the island, the mouse Mus batae-minotaurus, the Cretan otter, and the Cretan shrew. Like other Pleistocene animals on Crete, its chronology is poorly constrained, though one specimen has been suggested to date to around 50,000 years ago based on amino acid racemization dating.

== See also ==
- Mammuthus creticus a much smaller species of dwarf mammoth native to Crete during the Early-early Middle Pleistocene
- Dwarf elephant
