= Crocidura kornfeldi =

Crocidura kornfeldi Temporal range: Late Pliocene–Early Pleistocene

Scientific classification
- Kingdom: Animalia
- Phylum: Chordata
- Class: Mammalia
- Infraclass: Placentalia
- Order: Eulipotyphla
- Family: Soricidae
- Genus: Crocidura
- Species: †C. kornfeldi

Binomial name
- †Crocidura kornfeldi Kormos, 1934

Extinct species of mammal

Crocidura kornfeldi is an extinct species of shrew that inhabited Central and Southern Europe between the Pliocene and Pleistocene. It is the first species of the widespread, extremely speciose genus Crocidura known with certainty to have colonized Europe. It is a widespread, well-documented species, with fossils known from Spain, Italy, Greece, Hungary, Romania, and Crimea.

C. kornfeldi went extinct early in the Pleistocene, disappearing from the Iberian Peninsula around the boundary between the Early and Middle Pleistocene, possibly due to competition with newly-arriving species such as the modern greater white-toothed shrew (C. russula), lesser white-toothed shrew (C. suaveolens), and bicolored shrew (C. leucodon). However, the extant Cretan shrew (C. zimmermanni) bears a very close morphological similarity to C. kornfeldi, and for this reason may be a relict descendant of C. kornfeldi.
