= Mus minotaurus =

Scientific classification
- Kingdom: Animalia
- Phylum: Chordata
- Class: Mammalia
- Order: Rodentia
- Family: Muridae
- Genus: Mus
- Species: †M. minotaurus

Binomial name
- †Mus minotaurus Bate, 1942

Extinct species of mouse

Mus minotaurus is an extinct species of mouse native to Crete during the Late Pleistocene-Holocene. It descended from a Mus musculus (house mouse)-like ancestor that arrived on Crete during the late Middle Pleistocene, replacing Kritimys, a large rat-like rodent that inhabited Crete during the Early and Middle Pleistocene. Kritimys and the ancestor of Mus minotaurus, Mus bateae are found together in Stavrós Cave. The Mus batae-minotaurus lineage shows a tendency to increase in size with time, an example of island gigantism, with Mus minotaurus being one of the largest known members of the genus Mus, with a body mass of approximately 54 grams, over 3 times the size of its mainland ancestor. It was likely heavily predated upon by the extinct endemic Cretan owl, as evidenced by the abundance of its remains found in owl pellets. It inhabited the island alongside a species of elephant (Palaeoloxodon creutzburgi), the radiation of endemic Candiacervus deer, the Cretan otter, and the Cretan shrew (which is still extant). Mus minotaurus became extinct sometime during the Holocene epoch, with its remains apparently being found in Neolithic and early Bronze Age sites on the island. Its extinction may have been due to competition with the closely related house mouse introduced to the island by humans during the early Bronze Age.
