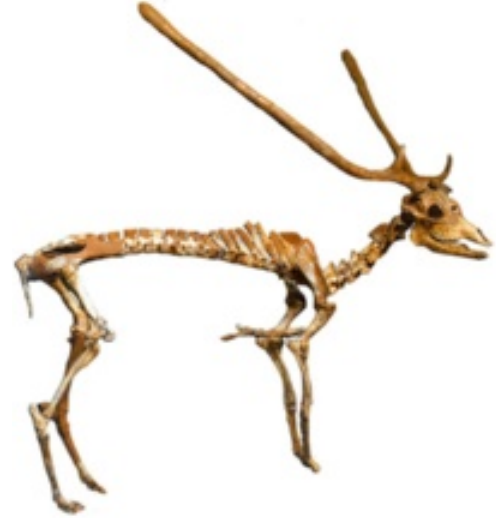
- Specimen of Candiacervus sp. II

Scientific classification
- Kingdom: Animalia
- Phylum: Chordata
- Class: Mammalia
- Infraclass: Placentalia
- Order: Artiodactyla
- Family: Cervidae
- Genus: †Candiacervus; Kuss, 1975

Species
- †Candiacervus ropalophorus de Vos, 1984; †Candiacervus cretensis (Simonelli, 1907) (type); †Candiacervus dorothensis (Capasso Barbato, 1990); †Candiacervus rethymensis Kuss, 1975; †Candiacervus major (Capasso Barbato and Petronio, 1986); †Candiacervus devosi van der Geer, 2018; †Candiacervus listeri van der Geer, 2018; †Candiacervus reumeri van der Geer, 2018

= Candiacervus =

Candiacervus Temporal range: late Middle - Late Pleistocene

Extinct genus of deer

Candiacervus is an extinct genus of deer native to Pleistocene Crete. Due to a lack of other herbivores, the genus underwent an adaptive radiation, filling niches occupied by other taxa on the mainland. Due to the small size of Crete, some species underwent insular dwarfism, the smallest species, C. ropalophorus, stood about 40 centimetres (16 in) at the shoulders when fully grown, while other species were relatively large and comparable in size to mainland deer species. Some species (C. ropalophorus) are noted for their peculiar, elongate club-shaped antlers, though other species have more normal antlers.

== Taxonomy ==
The Cretan deer is a typical example of taxonomical problems involving endemic insular mammals, due to the much larger variety than on the mainland, and the strong endemism. This obscures taxonomy, because many endemic features of Candiacervus are not unique but are found in other island deer as well, such as Cervus astylodon (Ryukyu Islands) and Hoplitomeryx (Southern Italy). De Vos (1979, 1984, 1996) identified eight morphotypes into one genus (Candiacervus), whereas Capasso Barbato (1992) included the larger species, rethymnensis, major and dorothensis, in Cervus (subgenus Leptocervus) and the smaller species ropalophorus and cretensis in Megaloceros (subgenus Candiacervus), implying two different ancestors, and she also did not recognize sp. II with its three morphotypes, instead referring it to ropalophorus. A new paper published in 2018 rejected the conclusion of Capasso Barbato (1992) and formally named the three morphotypes of De Vos' Candiacervus sp. II C. devosi, C. listeri, and C. reumeri.

On the nearby island of Karpathos, Kuss found deer which were, in his view, similar to the Cretan deer. Therefore, he grouped his species pygadiensis and cerigensis under the genus Candiacervus, but this needs further confirmation. As long as no direct link with Crete is attested, the deer genus of Karpathos is questioned, and better referred to as Cervus.

They were traditionally considered to be related to the giant Irish elk (Megaloceros giganteus) with some experts regarding Candiacervus as a subgenus of Megaloceros. However, van der Geer (2018) finds them closer to fallow deer (Dama), while Croitor has suggested that the genus is closely related to the giant deer genus Praemegaceros.

== Description ==
Skull of Candiacervus ropalophorus

The Cretan deer is represented by no less than eight different morphotypes, ranging from dwarf size with withers height of about 40 centimetres (16 in) to very large with withers height of about 165 centimetres (65 in), spanning a body mass range from 27.8 kilograms (61 lb) in the smallest species C. ropalophorus to 245.4 kilograms (541 lb) in the largest species C. major. This is explained as an adaptive radiation following ecological release to occupy available niches. The larger species had proportionally longer legs than mainland deer, while the dwarf species had proportionally shorter legs. The large size of the only known individual of C. major may be due to pituitary gigantism, in which case the species may be a synonym of one of the smaller species, perhaps the red deer sized C. dorothensis, which is suggested to weigh around 170.1 kilograms (375 lb). The short legs of the dwarf species is suggested to be an adaptation to a goat-like niche of climbing around on rocky terrain and consuming low quality foliage. The antler morphology was highly varied, in some of the dwarf species like C. ropalophorus, the antler was simplified and greatly elongated into a club like structure unique among deer, while others retained a more typical antler morphology. The club-like antlers of C. ropalophorus and similar forms were probably only used for display rather than combat. The antler and skull morphology is unknown in the largest species.

== Ecology ==
The fauna of which Candiacervus is an element is called Biozone II, or the Mus Zone (after the Mus genus of mice). This fauna inhabited Crete between the late Middle and Late Pleistocene, approximately 0.3 to 0.01 million years ago. It succeeds the Kritimys biozone, which spanned the Early to early Middle Pleistocene.

The typical terrestrial mammalian fauna elements of this biozone aside from Candiacervus are a lineage of mice (Mus bateae, M. minotaurus), a dwarf elephant (Palaeoloxodon creutzburgi), the Cretan otter (Lutrogale (Isolalutra) cretensis), and the Cretan shrew (Crocidura zimmermanni).

Despite living in an environment free of large terrestrial predators, the species of Candiacervus exhibited relatively high rates of juvenile mortality, with likely causes of death being accidents and malnutrition. The growth rate of the bones of dwarf Candiacervus was relatively slow compared to living deer. Adult individuals are suggested to have had relatively long lifespans compared to extant ruminants of a similar body size, with some individuals of dwarf Candiacervus reaching a lifespan of 18 years.

== Extinction ==
The extinction of Candiacervus may be due to the arrival of humans at the end of the Pleistocene. They could have exterminated the deer either actively by hunting, or passively by destroying its habitat. Another option is a gradual depletion of the ecosystem, as indicated by the finding of a complete herd consisting of individuals suffering a bone disease of an osteosclerotic nature. The impact of Paleolithic humans is at present still unproven, partly because of the scarcity on published fauna lists from archaeological sites (except for Knossos), partly because of the insecurely dated materials.

In 2018, it was proposed that Asphendou Cave petroglyphs in western Crete depicted Candiacervus, suggesting that humans and Candiacervus chronologically overlapped on the island.

== See also ==
- Cervus astylodon extinct species of dwarf deer endemic to the Ryukyu Islands of Japan during the Pleistocene.
