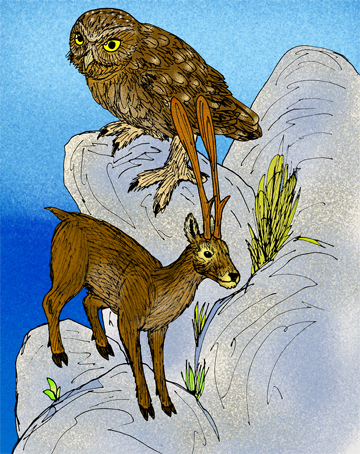
- Athene cretensis and Candiacervus ropalophorus

Scientific classification
- Kingdom: Animalia
- Phylum: Chordata
- Class: Aves
- Order: Strigiformes
- Family: Strigidae
- Genus: Athene
- Species: †A. cretensis

Binomial name
- †Athene cretensis Weesie, 1982

= Cretan owl =

Cretan owl Temporal range: Middle-Late Pleistocene

Extinct species of owl

The Cretan owl (Athene cretensis) is an extinct species of owl that belongs to the family Strigidae. It lived during the Middle and Late Pleistocene epoch being endemic to the islands of Crete and Armathia in the eastern Mediterranean. It’s mainland ancestor was probably the little owl (Athene noctua).

Its primary prey was likely mouse species Mus minotaurus which is endemic to the island. This is evidenced by the numerous owl pellets containing remains of this species recovered from the caves from which the bones of A. cretensis were found. This species, along with other species of the genus Athene, may have died out due to niche competition from terrestrial carnivores that later arrived in their islands. An alternative is that their extinction may have been due to the arrival of humans on the islands.

== Discovery ==
The species was first described and named in 1982 by P.D.M. Weesie. Fossil remains of this species were collected from several localities across the island of Crete. The specific name was named after the island of Crete which its holotype was discovered on.

Most fossil materials studied by P. D. M. Weesie originated from Liko cave which is the type locality of this species. The holotype specimens consist of a complete left humerus. Paratype material of this species are all complete and includes a left ulna, left carpometacarpus, right femur, left tibiotarsus and a right tarsometatarsus.

Pieper (1984) has reported the discovery of a humerus belonging to this species from a Pleistocene deposite of unknown age on the island of Armathia, nearby Kasos and Karpathos. Not much information is known about this discovery and requires further study.

== Description ==
In life, it would have been at least 60 cm tall, which is considerably larger than the 22 cm long little owl (Athene noctua). It appears to have been adapted to terrestrial habitats as evidenced by its relatively short wings and legs. Although their legs were proportionally shorter than those of the burrowing owl (Athene cunicularia), its legs were still disproportionately long. Morphologically, this species is identical to the little owl except in the form of the crista bicipitalis of the proximal humerus.
