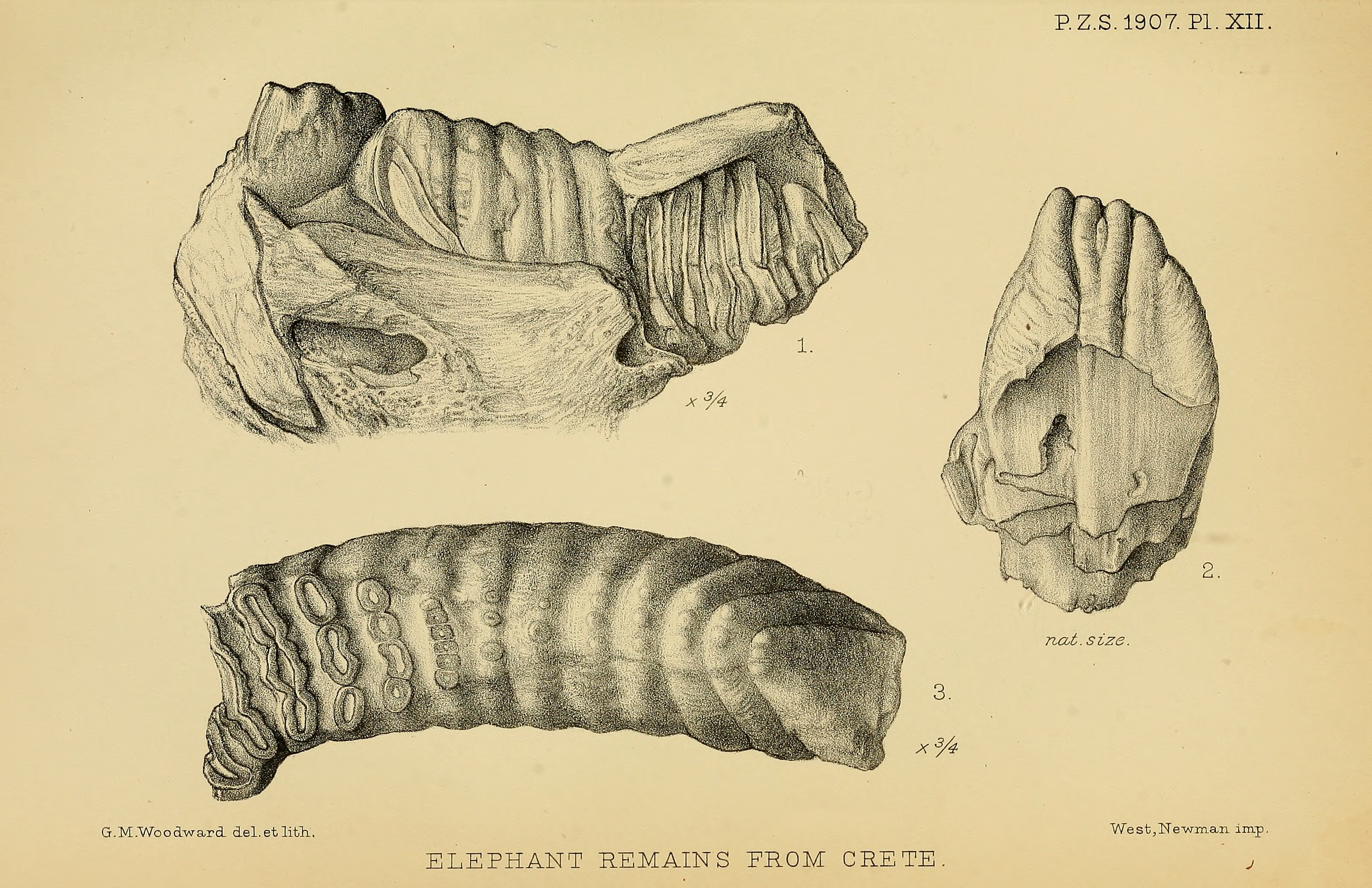
- Lithograph of jaw and molar teeth

Scientific classification
- Kingdom: Animalia
- Phylum: Chordata
- Class: Mammalia
- Infraclass: Placentalia
- Order: Proboscidea
- Family: Elephantidae
- Genus: †Mammuthus
- Species: †M. creticus

Binomial name
- †Mammuthus creticus (Bate, 1907)

Synonyms
- Elephas creticus Bate, 1907

= Mammuthus creticus =

Mammuthus creticus Temporal range: Pleistocene

Extinct species of Cretan dwarf mammoth

Mammuthus creticus, or the Cretan dwarf mammoth, is an extinct species of dwarf mammoth endemic to the island of Crete in the eastern Mediterranean sometime during the Early Pleistocene to early Middle Pleistocene. It is known from fragmentary remains found in caves on the north coast of the island. It is the smallest known dwarf mammoth and among smallest known dwarf elephantids, with an estimated shoulder height of around 1 metre (3 ft 3 in) in adults. It was probably descended from the large mammoth Mammuthus meridionalis native to mainland Europe during the Early Pleistocene.

== Discoveries ==
The type locality is Cape Malekas on the northern coast of the Akrotiri peninsula, northeast of Chania in northwest Crete, which probably dates to the Early Pleistocene or early Middle Pleistocene. Other possible remains have been reported from Koutalas Cave on Cape Drapanon in the Apokoronas municipality somewhat further to the west.

== Description ==
Mammuthus creticus was around the same size as the Sicilian dwarf elephant Palaeoloxodon falconeri (depicted)

Mammuthus creticus is only known from fragmentary remains, including molar teeth, an incisor, a humerus, rib fragments, and a partial vertebra. With an estimated shoulder height of about 1 metre (3.3 ft), and with a weight estimated at 310 kilograms (680 lb) or 180 kilograms (400 lb), it was the smallest mammoth that ever existed, and among the smallest elephantids along with the comparably sized dwarf elephants Palaeoloxodon falconeri of Sicily and Malta and Palaeoloxodon cypriotes of Cyprus. Its size reduction was the result of insular dwarfism, where the body size of large mammals on islands reduces as the result of decreased food availability, predation and competition.

== Taxonomy ==
The species was originally described as Elephas creticus by Dorothea Bate in 1907, who noted its similarity to Elephas meridionalis (now Mammuthus meridionalis). There was historically confusion about the taxonomic placement of the species and its relationship with other Mediterranean dwarf elephantids, including the larger Palaeoloxodon creutzburgi, which also inhabited Crete but was non-contemporaneous and chronologically later than M. creticus. A 2006 study claimed to have retrieved part of the sequence of the cytochrome b gene on the mitochondrial genome from specimens of M. creticus which the authors suggested supported the placement of the species as a true mammoth. A 2007 study criticised the results of the 2006 DNA study, and argued its results were likely invalid and potentially the result of contamination. However a later morphological analysis in 2012 supported its placement in Mammuthus regardless. This study suggested that M. creticus probably derived from Mammuthus meridionalis, or less likely, Mammuthus rumanus.

== Ecology ==
Mammuthus creticus was one of only three mammal species native to Crete during the Early Pleistocene and the early Middle Pleistocene, alongside the dwarf hippopotamus Hippopotamus creutzburgi and the giant rat Kritimys.

== See also ==
- Dwarf elephant
- Mammuthus lamarmorai a dwarf mammoth species known from the Middle-Late Pleistocene of Sardinia
- Mammuthus exilis a dwarf mammoth native to the Channel Islands off the coast of California during the Late Pleistocene
