= Cretan shrew =

Conservation status
- Endangered (IUCN 3.1)

Scientific classification
- Kingdom: Animalia
- Phylum: Chordata
- Class: Mammalia
- Order: Eulipotyphla
- Family: Soricidae
- Genus: Crocidura
- Species: C. zimmermanni

Binomial name
- Crocidura zimmermanni Wettstein, 1953
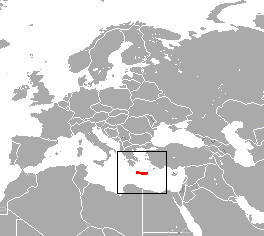
- Cretan shrew range

Species of mammal

The Cretan shrew (Crocidura zimmermanni) is a species of mammal in the family Soricidae. It is endemic to the island of Crete, Greece.

== Taxonomy and evolution ==
Crocidura russula zimmermanni was first described as a subspecies of C. russula in 1953, and reconsidered as a full species by Vogel et al in 1986 on the basis of their distinct karyotype. The Cretan shrew has 34 pairs of chromosomes, while the other species examined in the study had 40.

It may be a descendant of the extinct Crocidura kornfeldi, the first Crocidura shrew to colonize Europe, which was distributed throughout central and southern Europe during the Pliocene and Pleistocene. It likely reached the island by rafting at some point in the early Pleistocene. It has remained extant on the island, while contemporaneous Cretan mammals such as mice, dwarf elephants, eight species of Candiacervus deer, and the Cretan otter went extinct.

Unlike many small island mammals, it did not exhibit island gigantism, remaining approximately the same size throughout its evolutionary history on the island. The Cretan shrew's primary predators are owls and other predatory birds. Unlike other Mediterranean islands, Crete may have had some terrestrial predators, including ground owls and otters, which may explain the lack of island gigantism.

== Habitat and status ==
The Cretan shrew is endemic to Crete, where it has been found on only three mountains, having been displaced from lower altitudes by the lesser white-toothed shrew (Crocidura suaveolens) and the Etruscan shrew (Suncus etruscus), which were introduced by humans around 1500 BCE and 1300 BCE, respectively. Its natural habitat is temperate shrubland, and the animal is threatened by habitat loss.

Scientists estimate based on data from owl pellets that within its range it is over ten times less common than the lesser white-toothed shrew. Due to its small, fragmented range, and competition with invasive shrew species, the species is considered endangered by the IUCN.
