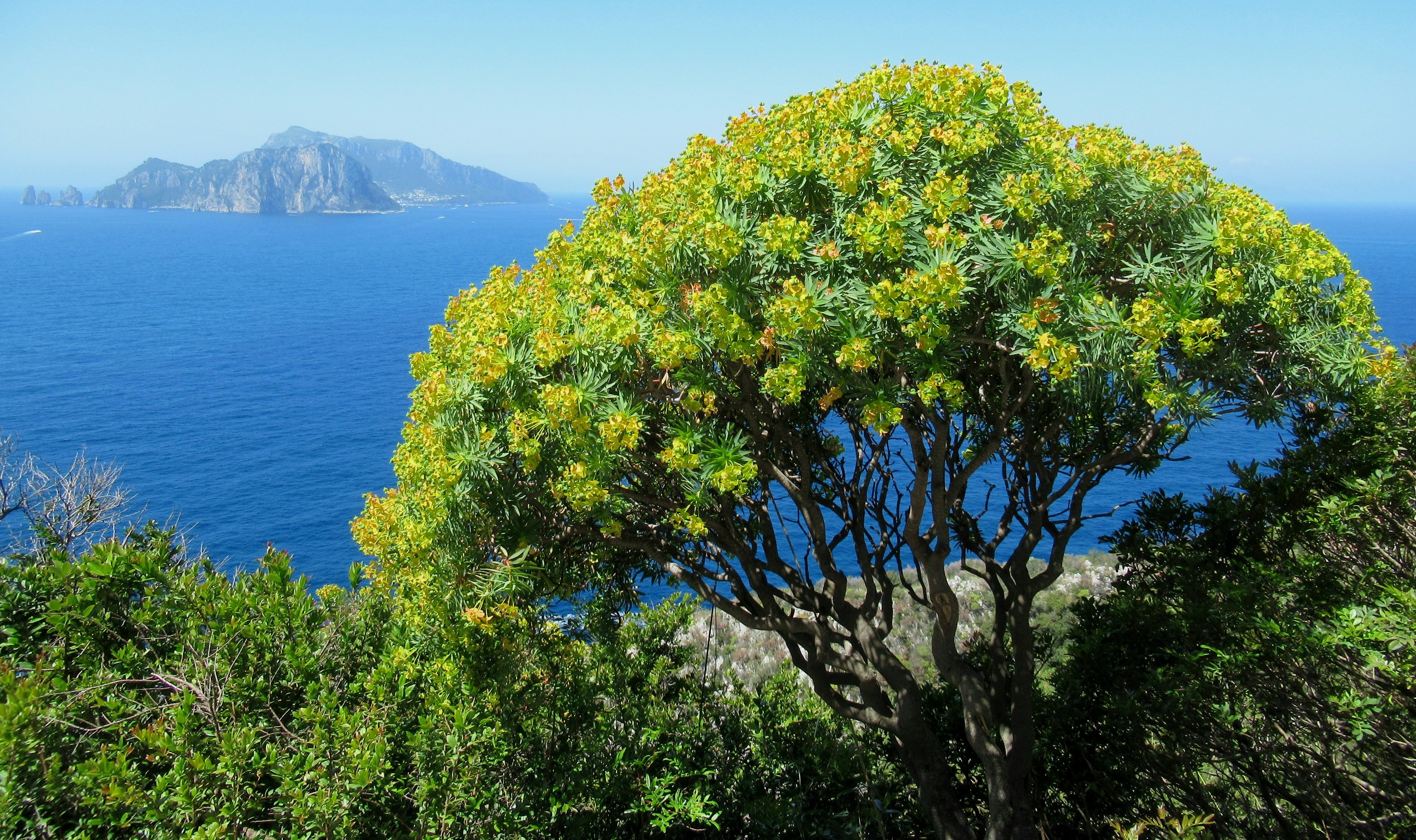
- Euphorbia dendroides on the Mediterranean

Conservation status
- Least Concern (IUCN 3.1)
- CITES Appendix II

Scientific classification
- Kingdom: Plantae
- Clade: Tracheophytes
- Clade: Angiosperms
- Clade: Eudicots
- Clade: Rosids
- Order: Malpighiales
- Family: Euphorbiaceae
- Genus: Euphorbia
- Species: E. dendroides

Binomial name
- Euphorbia dendroides L.

= Euphorbia dendroides =

Species of flowering plant

Euphorbia dendroides, also known as tree spurge, is a small tree or large shrub of the family Euphorbiaceae that grows in semi-arid and mediterranean climates.

== Distribution and habitat ==
Euphorbia dendroides has a wide distribution throughout the Mediterranean region, from Morocco and the Balearic Islands in the west to Syria, Jordan and Egypt in the east in Europe, southwest Asia, and North Africa. This plant is sensitive to frost, so it only grows on protected and sunny mountainsides in hilly areas. It has been introduced to other countries out of its original range as an ornamental tree.

== Description ==
This bush also has uses in traditional medicine; like many other species of genus Euphorbia its toxic white and sticky sap has been used to treat skin excrescences, like cancers, tumors, and warts since ancient times.

== Gallery ==
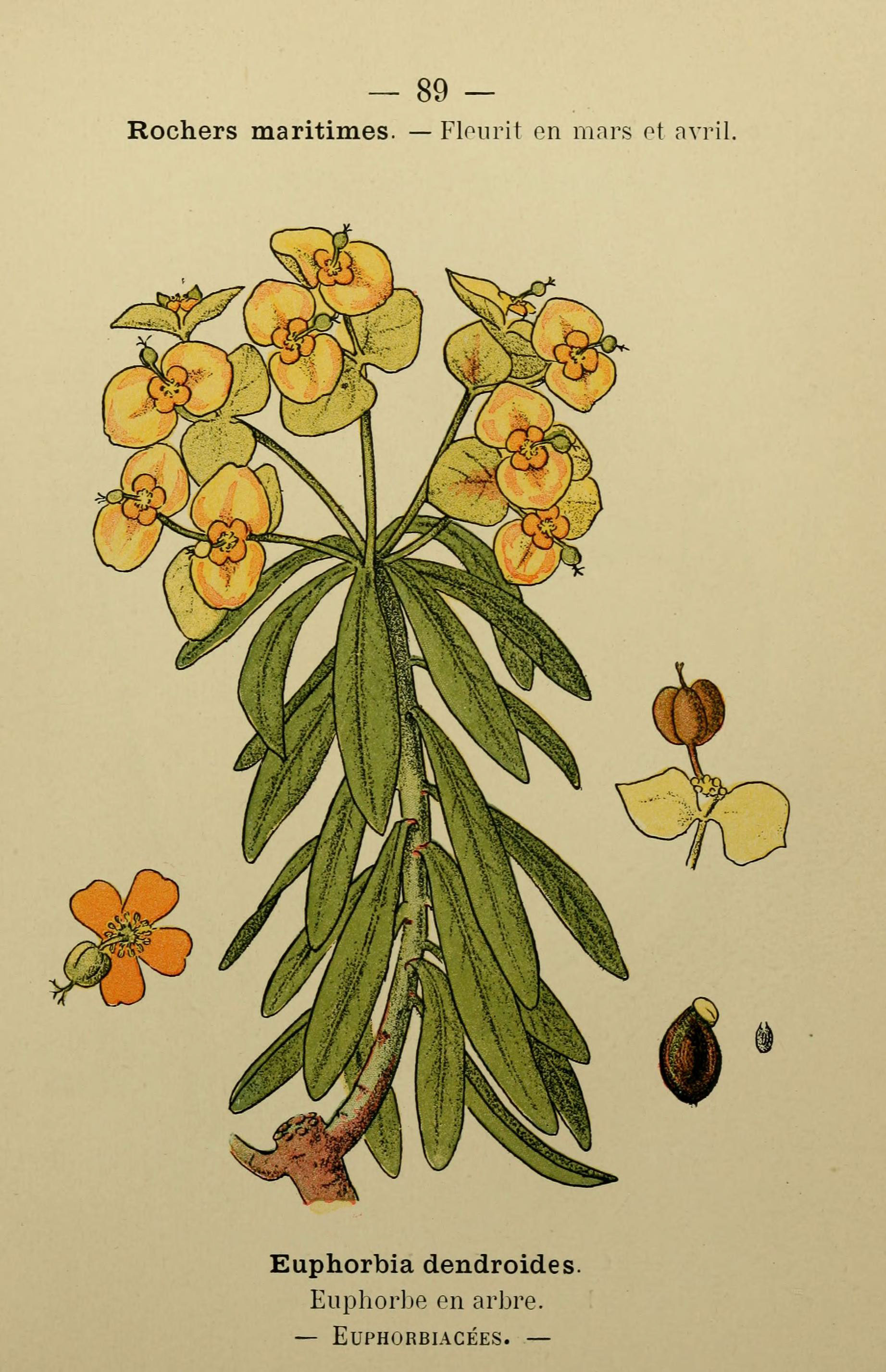
Flora illustration

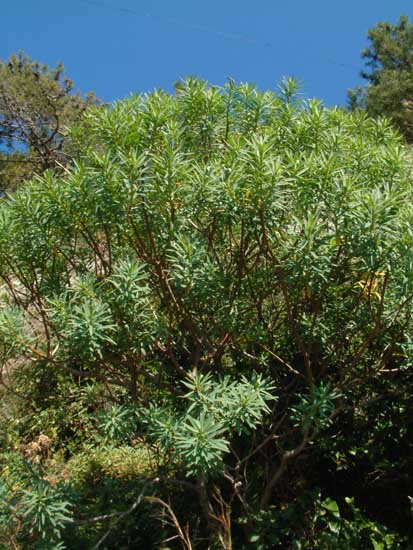
Vegetative part

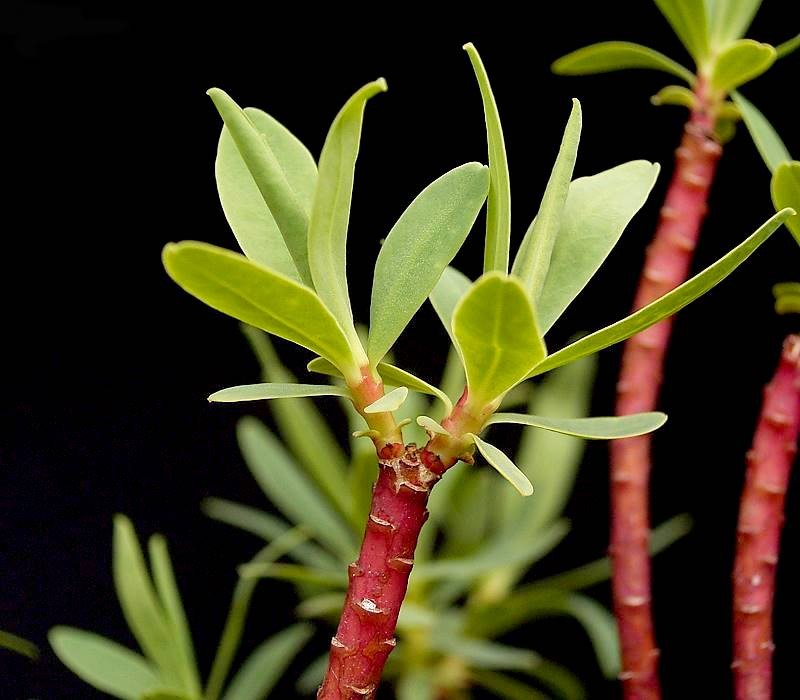
Detail of the leaves

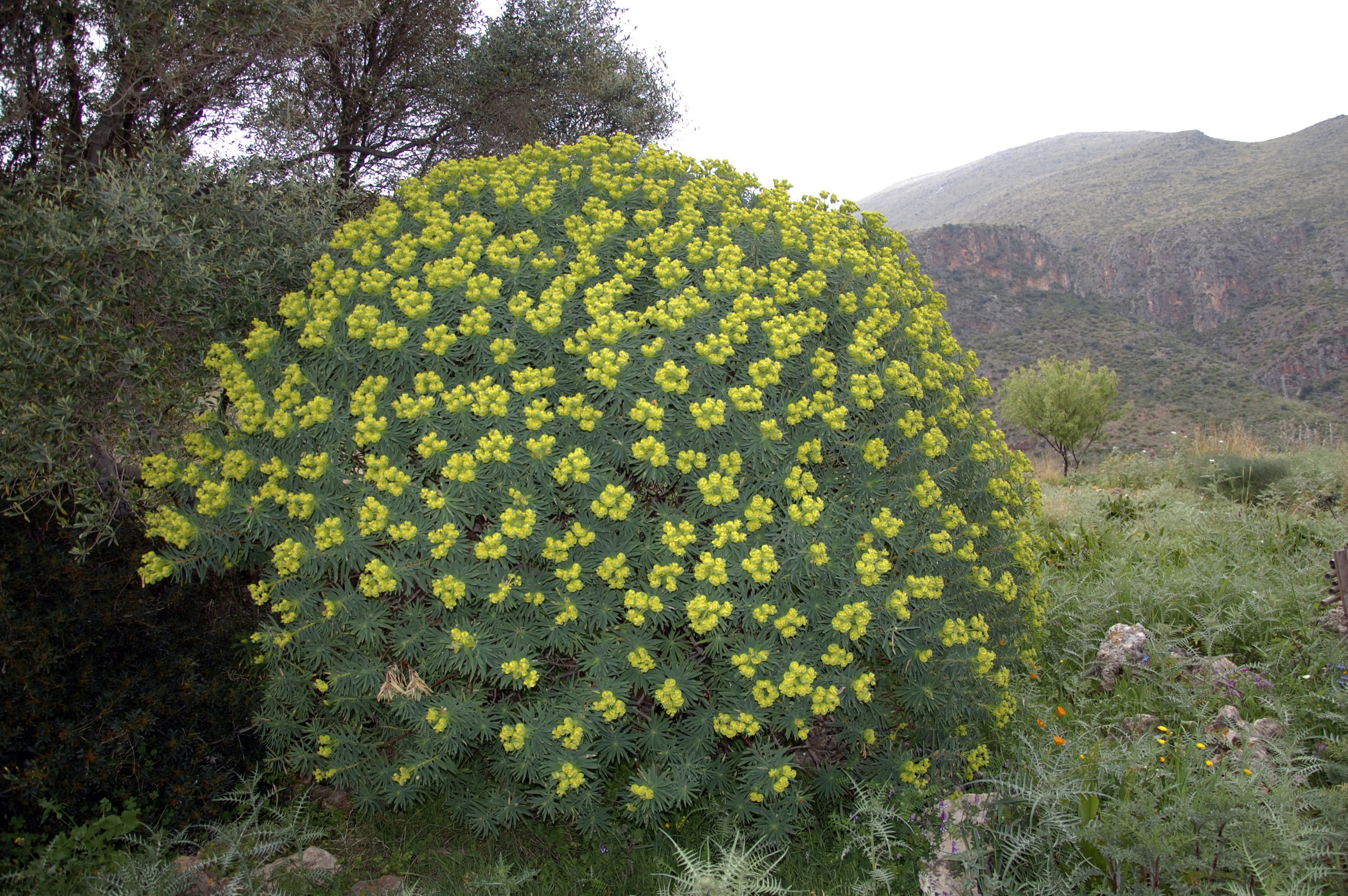
Global shape with flowers

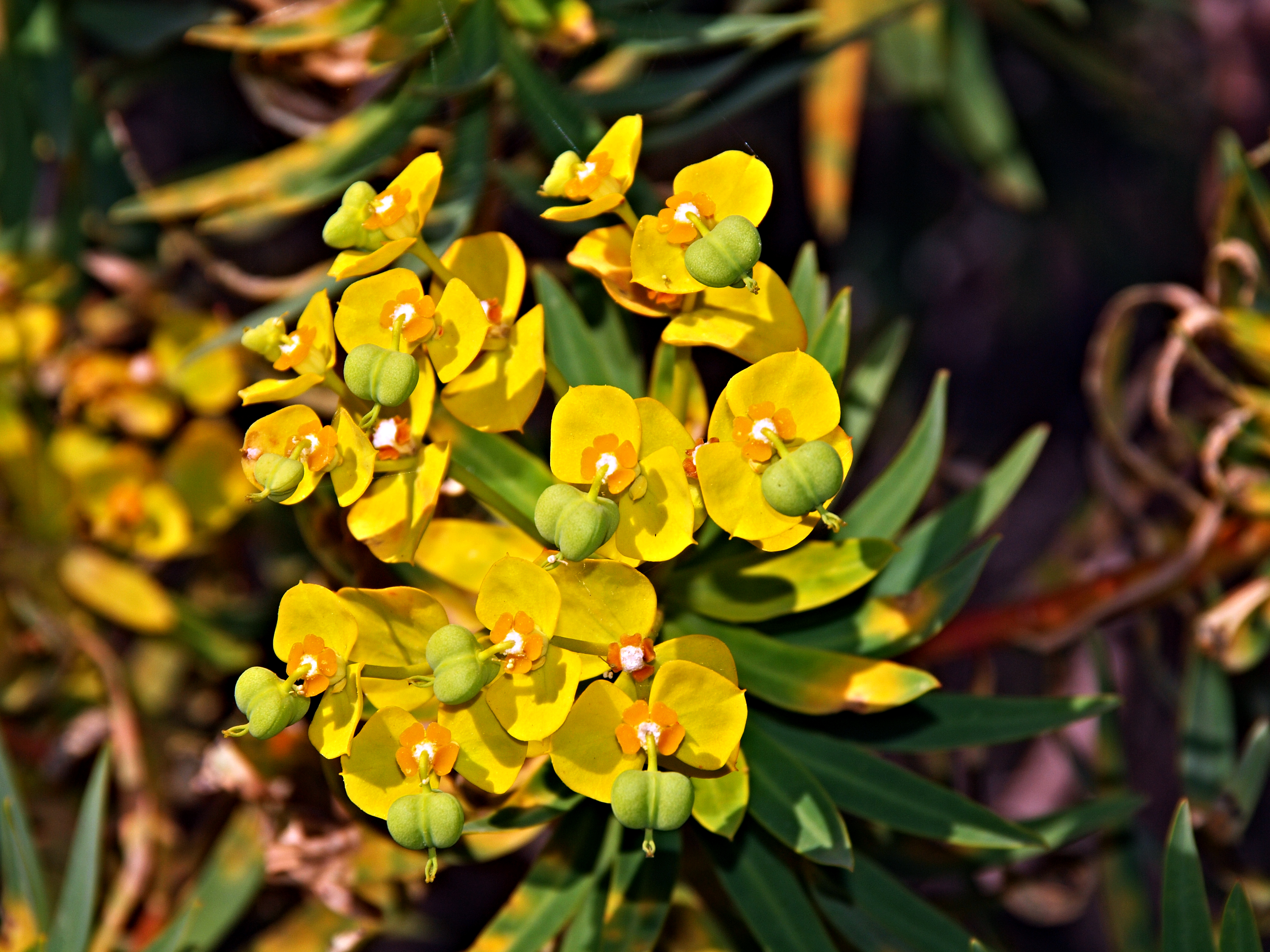
Detail of the flowers

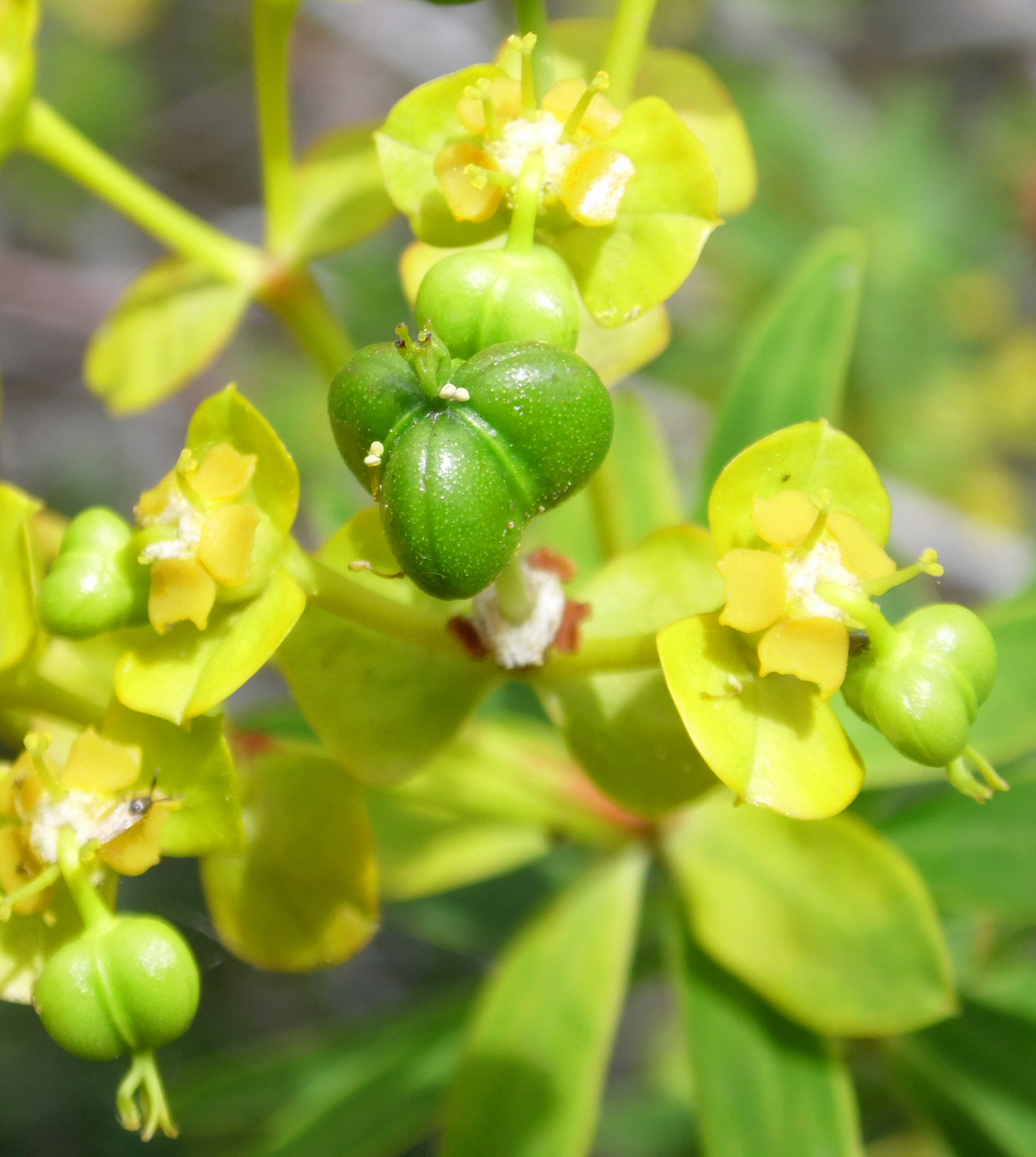
Capsule
