= Kritimys =

Kritimys Temporal range: Early - Middle Pleistocene

Scientific classification
- Kingdom: Animalia
- Phylum: Chordata
- Class: Mammalia
- Infraclass: Placentalia
- Order: Rodentia
- Family: Muridae
- Subfamily: Murinae
- Genus: †Kritimys; Kuss & Missone, 1968

Species
- K. catreus Bate, 1912; K. kiridus Bate, 1942

Synonyms
- Mus catreus; Rattus kiridus

Extinct genus of rodent

Kritimys, also known as the Cretan giant rat is an extinct genus of murid rodent that was endemic to the island of Crete during the Early and Middle Pleistocene. There are two known species, K. kiridus from the Early-Mid Pleistocene, and its descendant K. catreus from the Middle Pleistocene. It is suggested to be closely related to and probably derived from Praomys. As with most island rodents, Kritimys was larger than its mainland relatives, with its size increasing over time, with K. catreus estimated to weigh 518 grams (1.142 lb), around 6.7 times the weight of its mainland ancestor, an example of island gigantism. The temporal range of the genus is considered to define the regional Kritimys biozone, during which time there were only two other species of mammal native to the island, a species of dwarf mammoth, Mammuthus creticus and the dwarf hippopotamus Hippopotamus creutzburgi. It became extinct during the late Middle Pleistocene, following the arrival of the Mus bateae-minotaurus lineage (which appears to be related to Mus musculus) to the island, exhibiting a decrease in size shortly before its extinction.
