= History of Crete =

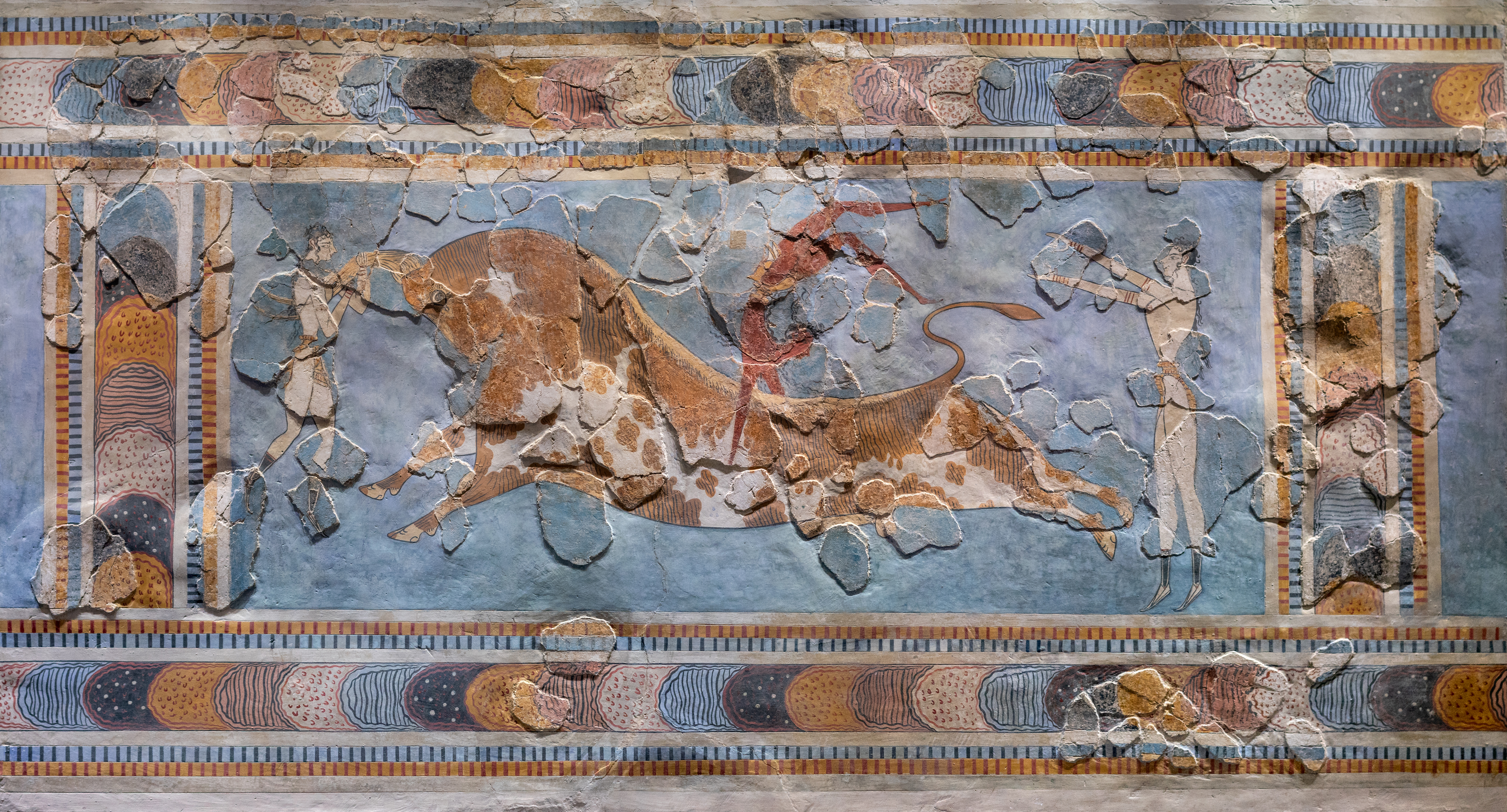
The Bull-Leaping Fresco from Knossos showing bull-leaping, c. 1450 BC; probably, the dark skinned figure is a man and the two light skinned figures are women

The history of Crete goes back to the 7th millennium BC, preceding the ancient Minoan civilization by more than four millennia. The Minoan civilization was the first civilization in Europe.

During the Iron Age, Crete developed an Ancient Greece-influenced organization of city-states, then successively became part of the Roman Empire, the Byzantine Empire, the Venetian Republic, the Ottoman Empire, an autonomous state, and the modern state of Greece.

== Prehistoric Crete ==
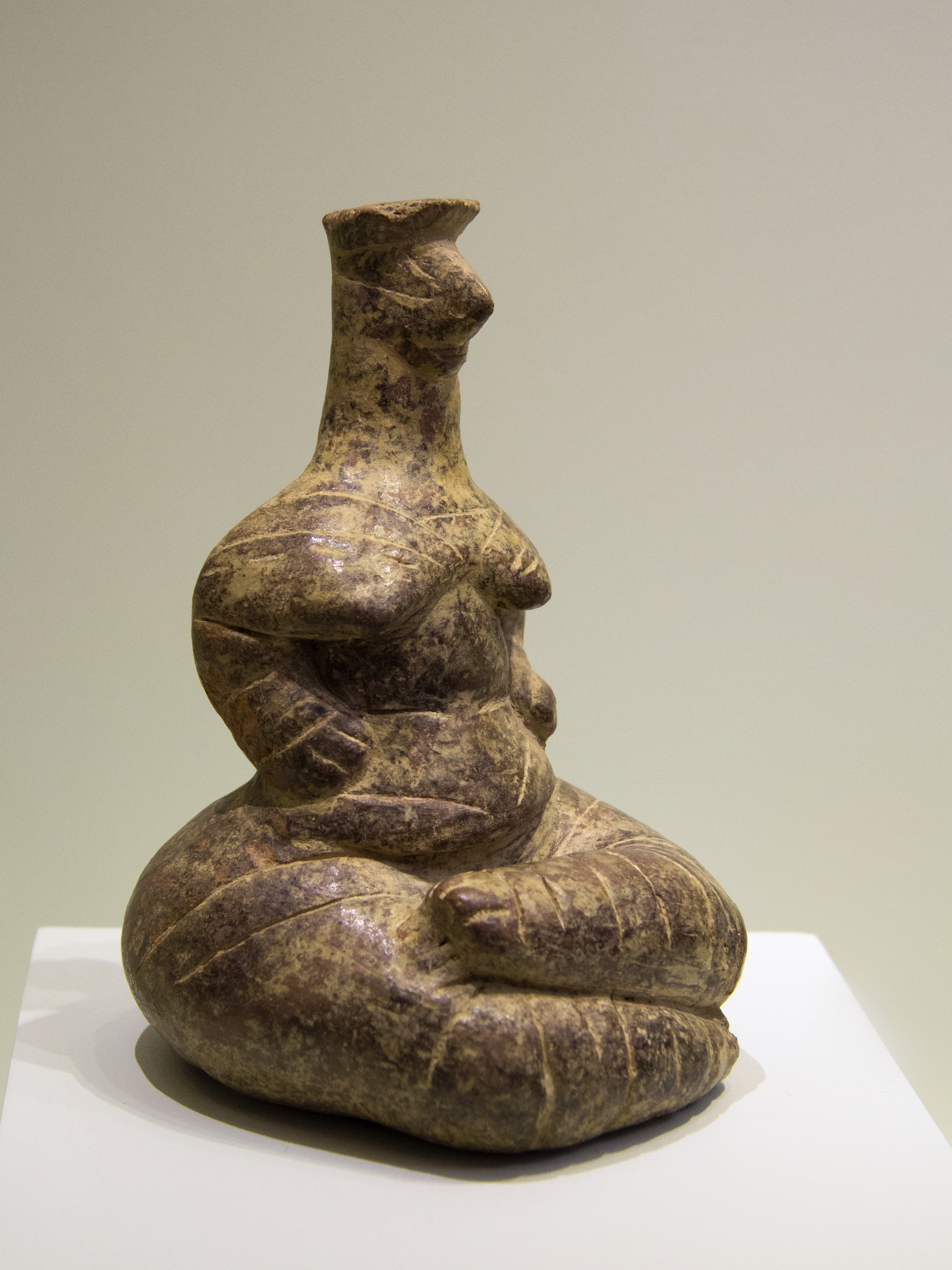
Goddess clay figurine. Neolithic, 5300–3000 BC. Pano Chorio, Ierapetra region, Crete. Archaeological Museum of Heraklion

Excavations in South Crete in 2008–2009 revealed stone tools at least 130,000 years old, including bifacial ones of Acheulean type. This was a sensational discovery, as the previously accepted earliest sea crossing in the Mediterranean was thought to occur around 12,000 BC. This suggests that the island may have been visited by archaic humans during the Middle Pleistocene. During the Late Pleistocene, the island was ecologically isolated, and only inhabited by a few mammal species, including deer belonging to the endemic genus Candiacervus, a lineage of mice (Mus bateae, M. minotaurus), a dwarf elephant (Palaeoloxodon creutzburgi), the Cretan otter (Lutrogale (Isolalutra) cretensis), and the Cretan shrew (Crocidura zimmermanni), as well as the large terrestrial Cretan owl (Athene cretensis) all of which but the shrew are now extinct.

Stone tools indicate that the island was inhabited by Mesolithic hunter gatherers during the Early Holocene. The Neolithic begins on Crete around 9000 years Before Present /7000 BC. In the Neolithic period, some of the early influences on the development of Cretan culture arise from the Cyclades and from Egypt; cultural records are written in the undeciphered script known as "Linear A". The archaeological record of Crete includes Minoan palaces, houses, roads, paintings and sculptures. Early Neolithic settlements in Crete include Knossos and Trapeza.

For the earlier times, radiocarbon dating of organic remains and charcoal offers some dates. Based on this, it is thought that Crete was inhabited from about 130,000 years ago, in the Lower Paleolithic, perhaps not continuously, with a Neolithic farming culture from the 7th millennium BC onwards. The first settlers introduced cattle, sheep, goats, pigs, and dogs, as well as domesticated cereals and legumes.

Remains of a settlement found under the Bronze Age palace at Knossos date to the 7th millennium BC. Up to now, Knossos remains the only aceramic site. The settlement covered approximately 350,000 square metres. The sparse animal bones contain the above-mentioned domestic species as well as deer, badger, marten and mouse: the extinction of the local megafauna had not left much game behind.

Neolithic pottery is known from Knossos, Lera Cave and Gerani Cave. The Late Neolithic sees a proliferation of sites, pointing to a population increase. In the late Neolithic, the donkey and the rabbit were introduced to the island; deer and agrimi were hunted. The Kri-kri, a feral goat, preserves traits of the early domesticates. Horse, fallow deer and hedgehog are only attested from Minoan times onwards.

== Minoan civilization and Mycenaean Period ==
Crete was the centre of Europe's most ancient civilization, the Minoans. Tablets inscribed in Linear A have been found in numerous sites in Crete, and a few in the Aegean islands. The Minoans established themselves in many islands besides Ancient Crete: secure identifications of Minoan off-island sites include Kea, Kythera, Milos, Rhodes, and above all, Thera (Santorini).

Because of a lack of written records, estimates of the Minoan chronology are based on well-established Minoan pottery styles, which can at points be tied to Egyptian and Ancient Near Eastern chronologies by finds away from Crete and clear influences. Archaeologists ever since Sir Arthur Evans have identified and uncovered the palace-complex at Knossos, the most famous Minoan site. Other palace sites in Crete such as Phaistos have uncovered magnificent stone-built, multi-story palaces containing drainage systems, and the queen had a bath and a flushing toilet. The expertise displayed in the hydraulic engineering was of a very high level. There were no defensive walls to the complexes. By the 16th century BC pottery and other remains on the Greek mainland show that the Minoans had far-reaching contacts on the mainland. In the 16th century a major earthquake caused destruction on Crete and on Thera that was swiftly repaired.

== Iron Age and Archaic Crete ==
The collapse of the Mycenaean civilization was followed by the appearance of the first Greek city-states in the 9th century BC and the epics of Homer in the 8th century BC. Some of the Dorian cities that prospered on Crete during those times are Kydonia, Lato, Dreros, Gortyn and Eleutherna.

== Classical and Hellenistic Crete ==
In the Classical and Hellenistic period Crete fell into a pattern of combative city-states, harboring pirates. In the late 4th century BC, the aristocratic order began to collapse due to endemic infighting among the elite, and Crete's economy was weakened by prolonged wars between city states. During the 3rd century BC, Gortyn, Kydonia (Chania), Lyttos and Polyrrhenia challenged the primacy of ancient Knossos.

While the cities continued to prey upon one another, they invited into their feuds mainland powers like Macedon and its rivals Rhodes and Ptolemaic Egypt. In 220 BC the island was tormented by a war between two coalitions of cities. As a result, the Macedonian king Philip V gained hegemony over Crete which lasted to the end of the Cretan War (205–200 BC), when the Rhodians opposed the rise of Macedon and the Romans started to interfere in Cretan affairs. In the 2nd century BC Ierapytna (Ierapetra) gained supremacy on eastern Crete.

== Roman, Byzantine, and Arab Crete ==
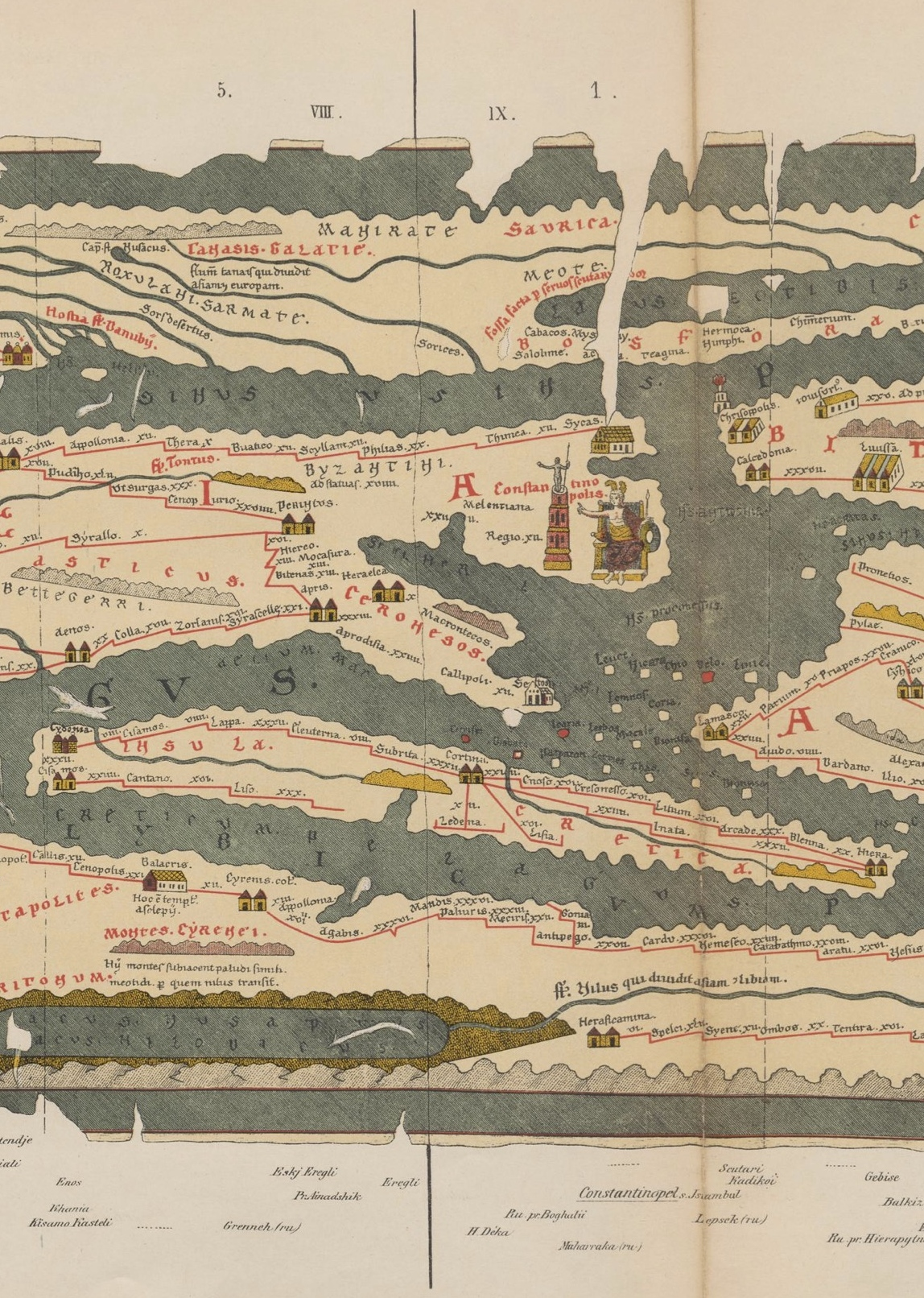
Crete (Insula Cretica) in Tabula Peutingeriana

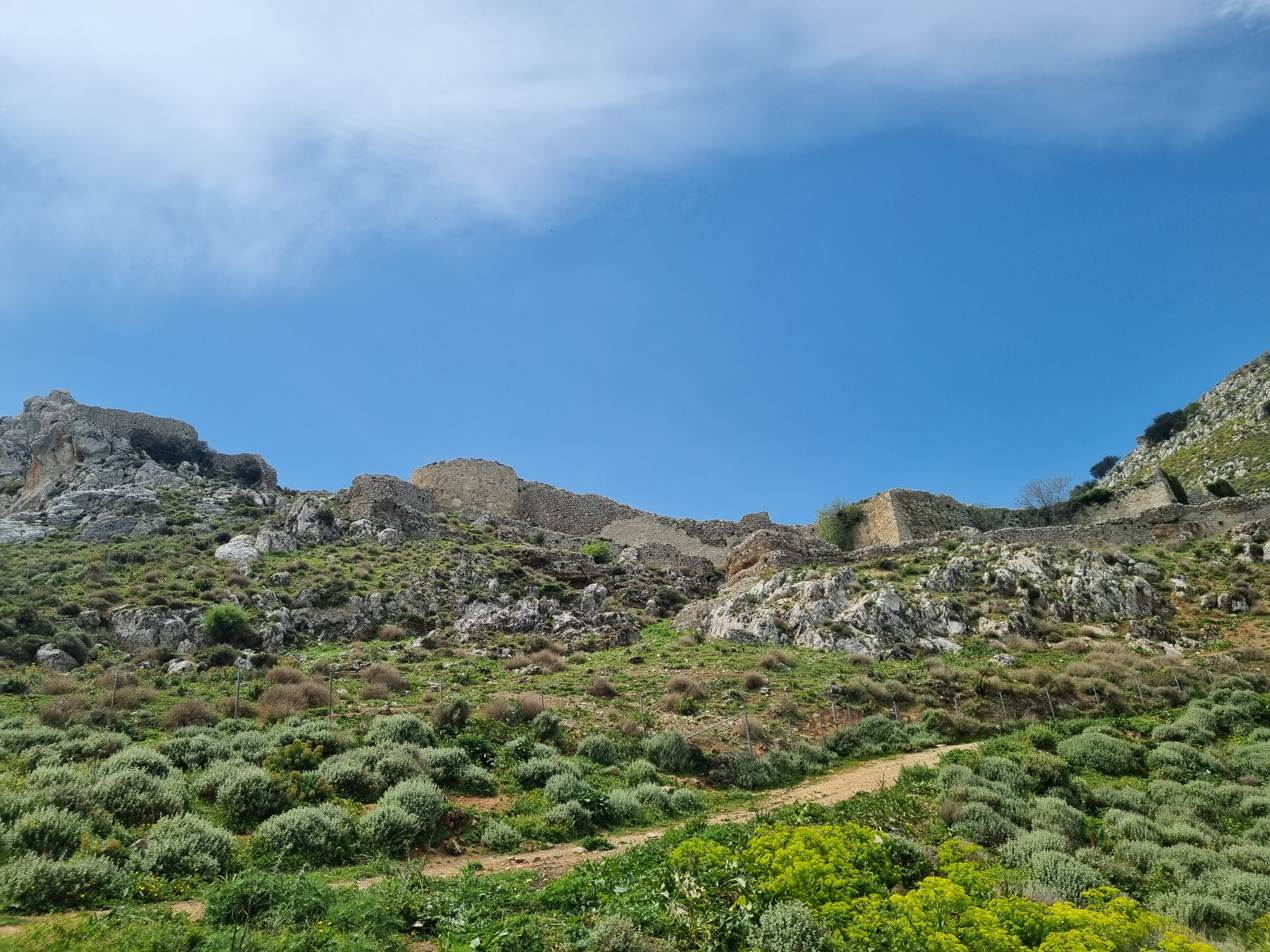
Temenos fortress was built by the Byzantines after the reconquest of the island from the Arabs

Mithridates VI Eupator, ruler of the Kingdom of Pontus in northern Anatolia, waged war against the Roman Republic in the year 88 BC in order to halt the advance of Roman hegemony in the Aegean Sea region. Mithridates VI sought to dominate Asia Minor and the Black Sea region, waging several hard-fought but ultimately unsuccessful wars (the Mithridatic Wars) to break Roman dominion over Asia and the Hellenic world. He has been called the greatest ruler of the Kingdom of Pontus.

Since 133 BC western and central Anatolia had been under Roman control, but Hellenistic culture remained predominant. On the pretext that Knossos was backing Mithridates VI, Marcus Antonius Creticus attacked Crete in 71 BC and was repelled. Rome sent Quintus Caecilius Metellus with three legions to the island. After a ferocious three-year campaign, Crete was conquered by the Roman army in 69 BC, earning the commander Metellus the agnomen "Creticus". At the archaeological sites, there seems to be little evidence of widespread damage associated with the transfer to Roman power: a single palatial house complex seems to have been razed. Gortyn seems to have been pro-Roman and was rewarded by being made the capital of the joint Roman province of Crete and Cyrenaica.

Further annexations by Rome, in particular of the Kingdom of Pontus by Pompey, brought all of Anatolia under Roman control, except for the southeastern frontier with the Parthian Empire, which would remain unstable for centuries, causing a series of military conflicts that culminated in the Roman–Parthian Wars (54 BC – 217 AD). Gortyn was the site of the largest Christian basilica on Crete, the Basilica of Saint Titus, dedicated to the first Christian bishop in Crete, to whom the Apostle Paul addressed one of his epistles. The church was founded in the 1st century AD. The island of Crete continued to be a province of the Eastern Roman Empire, otherwise known as the Byzantine Empire, a quiet cultural backwater, until it fell into the hands of Andalusian Muslims under Abu Hafs in the years 820s AD, who established a piratical emirate on the island. The archbishop Cyril of Gortyn was killed and the city so thoroughly devastated it was never reoccupied. Candia (Chandax, modern Heraklion), a city built by the Andalusian Muslims, was made capital of the island instead.

The Emirate of Crete became a center of Muslim piratical activity in the Aegean Sea, and a thorn in Byzantium's side. Successive campaigns to recover the island failed until the Byzantine reconquest of Crete in 961 AD, when the Byzantine Emperor Nikephoros II Phokas defeated and expelled the Muslim Arabs and Berbers from Crete for the Byzantine Empire, and made the island into a theme.

The Byzantine Greeks held power over the island until the Fourth Crusade (1204). In its aftermath, possession of the island was disputed between the Italian maritime republics of Genoa and Venice, with the latter eventually solidifying their control by 1212. Despite frequent revolts by the native population, the Venetians retained the island until 1669, when the Ottoman Empire took possession of it.

(The standard survey for this period is I.F. Sanders, An archaeological survey and Gazetteer of Late Hellenistic, Roman and Early Byzantine Crete, 1982)

- Annette Bingham, "Crete's Roman past: excavations yield antiquities from the Roman period," History Today, November 1995

== Venetian Crete (1205–1669) ==
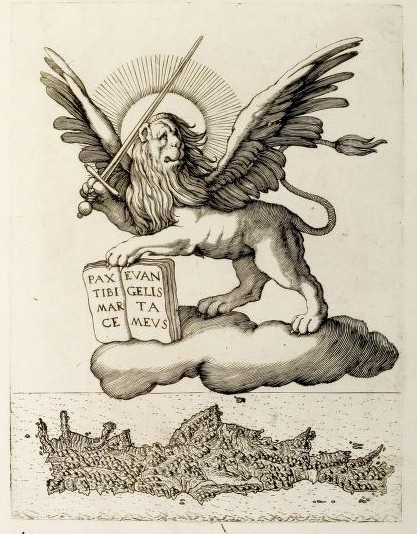
Venetian propaganda during the Siege: Il regno tutto di Candia, Marco Boschini, 1651

In the partition of the Byzantine empire after the capture of Constantinople by the armies of the Fourth Crusade in 1204, Crete was eventually acquired by Venice, which held it for more than four centuries (the "Kingdom of Candia").

The most important of the many rebellions that broke out during that period was the one known as the revolt of St. Titus. It occurred in 1363, when indigenous Cretans and Venetian settlers exasperated by the hard tax policy exercised by Venice, overthrew official Venetian authorities and declared an independent Cretan Republic. The revolt took Venice five years to quell.

During Venetian rule, the Greek population of Crete was exposed to Renaissance culture. A thriving literature in the Cretan dialect of Greek developed on the island. The best-known work from this period is the poem Erotokritos by Vitsentzos Kornaros (Βιτσένζος Κορνάρος). Another major Cretan literary figures were Marcus Musurus (1470–1517), Nicholas Kalliakis (1645–1707), Andreas Musalus (1665–1721), and other Greek scholars and philosophers who flourished in Italy in the 15–17th centuries.

Georgios Hortatzis was author of the dramatic work Erophile. The painter Domenicos Theotocopoulos, better known as El Greco, was born in Crete in this period and was trained in Byzantine iconography before moving to Italy and later, Spain.

== Ottoman Crete (1669–1898) ==
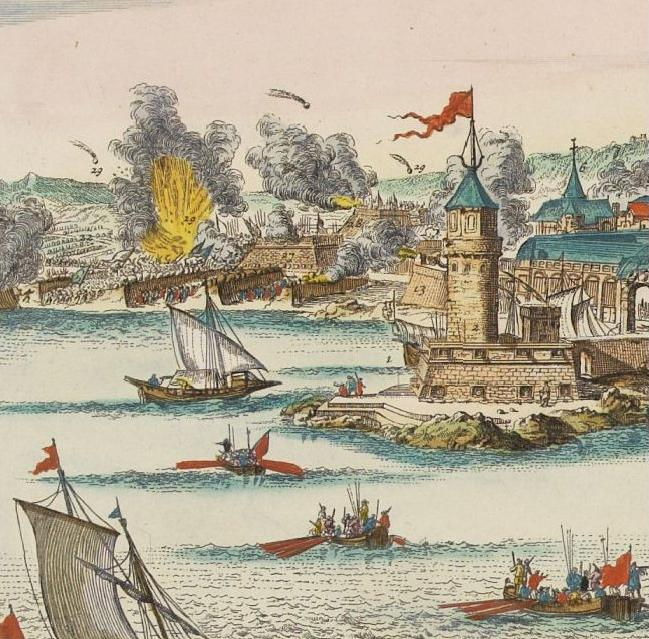
Ottoman siege of Candia

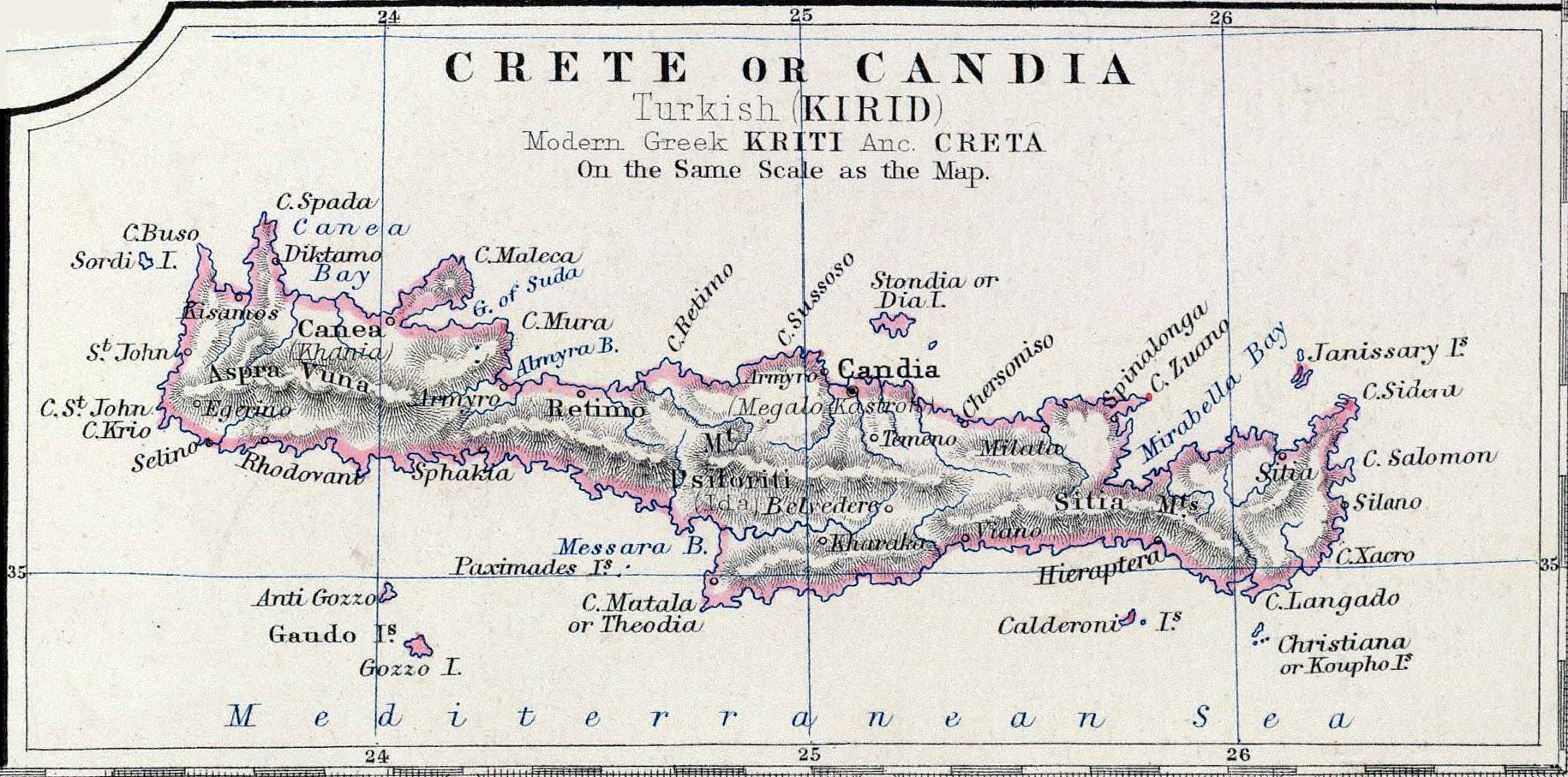
Crete or Candia in 1861

During the Cretan War (1645–1669), Venice was pushed out of Crete by the Ottoman Empire, with most of the island lost after the siege of Candia (1648–1669), possibly the longest siege in history. The last Venetian outpost on the island, Spinalonga, fell in 1718, and Crete was a part of the Ottoman Empire for the next two centuries. There were significant rebellions against Ottoman rule, particularly in Sfakia. Daskalogiannis was a famous rebel leader. One result of the Ottoman conquest was that a sizeable proportion of the population gradually converted to Islam, with its tax and other civic advantages in the Ottoman system. Contemporary estimates vary, but on the eve of the Greek War of Independence as much as 45% of the population of the island may have been Muslim.

Some Muslim converts were crypto-Christians, who converted back to Christianity; others fled Crete because of the unrest. By the last Ottoman census in 1881, Christians were 76% of the population, and Cretan Turks only 24%. Christians were over 90% of the population in 19 out of 23 of the districts of Crete, but Muslims were over 60% in the three large towns on the north coast, and in Monofatsi.

=== Greek War of Independence (1821) ===
The Greek War of Independence began in 1821, with extensive Cretan participation. An uprising by Christians met with a fierce response from the Ottoman authorities and the execution of several bishops, regarded as ringleaders. Sultan Mahmud II granted rule over Crete to Egypt's ruler Muhammad Ali Pasha in exchange for his military support. Between 1821 and 1828, the island was the scene of repeated hostilities. The Muslims were driven into the large fortified towns on the north coast and it would appear that as many as 60% of them died from plague or famine while there. The Cretan Christians also suffered severely, losing around 21% of their population in the 1830s.

Crete was subsequently left out of the new Greek state established under the London Protocol of 1830. Its administration by Muhammad Ali was confirmed in the Convention of Kütahya of 1833, but direct Ottoman rule was re-established by the Convention of London of 3 July 1840.

The island's Christians revolted several times against Ottoman rule. Revolts in 1841 and 1858 secured some privileges, such as the right to bear arms, equality of Christian and Muslim worship, and the establishment of Christian councils of elders with jurisdiction over education and customary law. Despite these concessions, the Christian Cretans maintained their ultimate aim of union with Greece, and tensions between the Christian and Muslim communities ran high. Thus, in 1866 the great Cretan Revolt began.

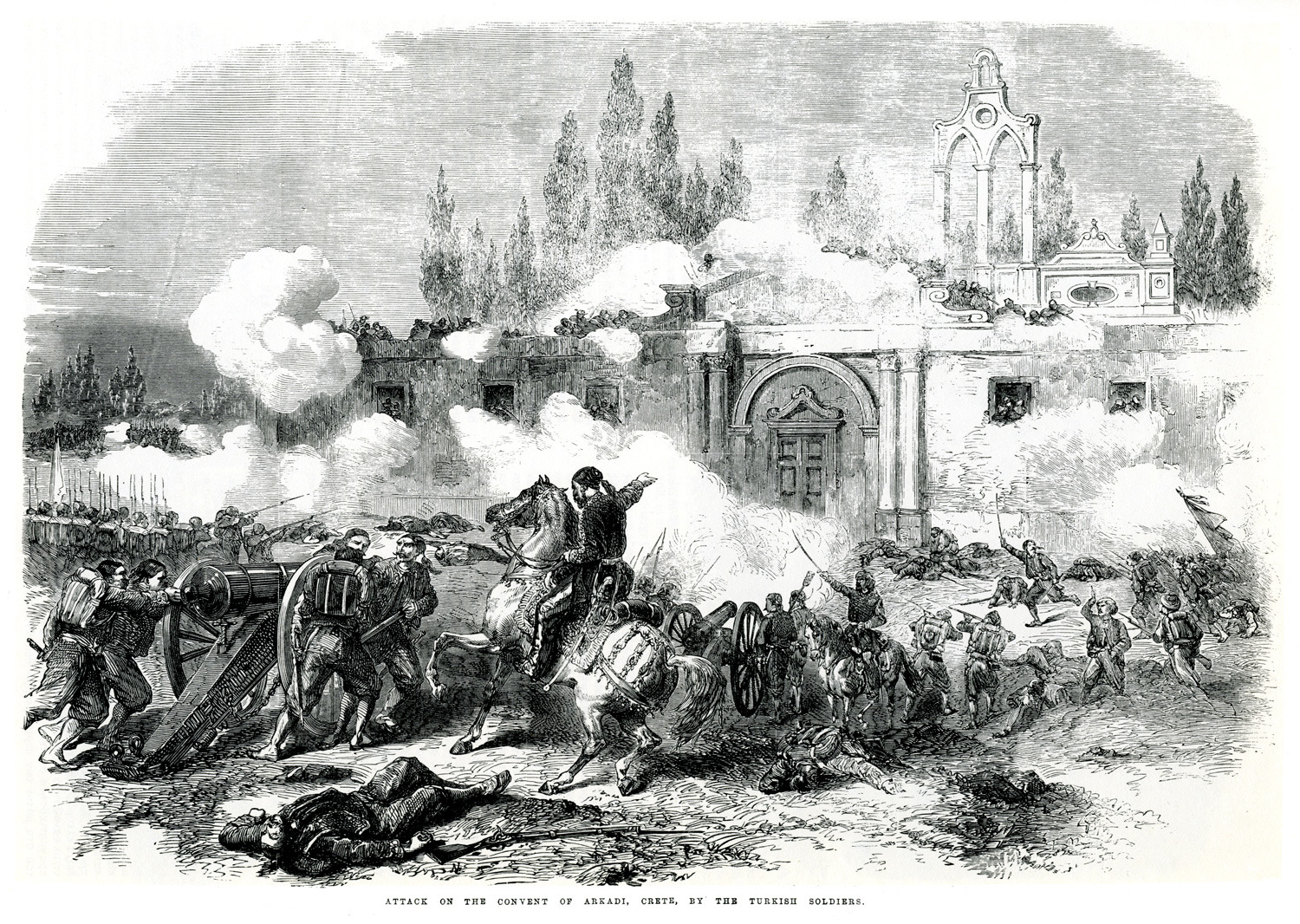
Ottomans attacking Arkadi Monastery, 1867

The uprising, which lasted for three years, involved volunteers from Greece and other European countries, where it was viewed with considerable sympathy, particularly after the Arkadi Holocaust. Despite early successes of the rebels, who quickly confined the Ottomans to the northern towns, the uprising failed. The Ottoman Grand Vizier A'ali Pasha personally assumed control of the Ottoman forces and launched a methodical campaign to retake the rural districts, which was combined with promises of political concessions, notably by the introduction of an Organic Law, which gave the Cretan Christians equal (in practice, because of their superior numbers, majority) control of local administration. His approach bore fruits, as the rebel leaders gradually submitted. By early 1869, the island was again under Ottoman control.

During the Congress of Berlin in the summer of 1878, there was a further rebellion, which was halted quickly by the intervention of the British and the adaptation of the 1867-8 Organic Law into a constitutional settlement known as the Pact of Halepa. Crete became a semi-independent parliamentary state within the Ottoman Empire under an Ottoman Governor who had to be a Christian. A number of the senior "Christian Pashas" including Photiades Pasha and Kostis Adosidis Pasha ruled the island in the 1880s, presiding over a parliament in which liberals and conservatives contended for power.

Disputes between the two powers led to a further insurgency in 1889 and the collapse of the Pact of Halepa arrangements. The international powers, disgusted at what seemed to be factional politics, allowed the Ottoman authorities to send troops to the island and restore order but did not anticipate that Ottoman Sultan Abdul Hamid II would use this as a pretext to end the Halepa Pact Constitution and instead rule the island by martial law. This action led to international sympathy for the Cretan Christians and to a loss of any remaining acquiescence among them to continued Ottoman rule. When a small insurgency began in September 1895, it spread quickly, and by the summer of 1896 the Ottoman forces had lost military control of most of the island.

A new Cretan insurrection in 1897 led to the Ottoman Empire declaring war on Greece. However, the Great Powers (Austria-Hungary, France, the German Empire, the Kingdom of Italy, the Russian Empire and Great Britain) decided that the Ottoman Empire could no longer maintain control and intervened, dispatching a multinational naval force, the International Squadron, to Cretan waters in February 1897. The squadron's senior admirals formed an "Admirals Council" which temporarily governed the island. The International Squadron bombarded Cretan insurgents, placed sailors and marines ashore, and instituted a blockade of Crete and key ports in Greece, bringing organized combat on the island to an end by late March 1897. Soldiers from the armies of five of the powers (Germany refused to participate) then occupied key cities in Crete during late March and April 1897. Eventually, the Admirals Council decided to establish an autonomous state within the Ottoman Empire on Crete. After a violent riot by Cretan Turks on 6 September 1898 (25 August according to the Julian calendar then in use on Crete, which was 12 days behind the modern Gregorian calendar during the 19th century), the admirals also decided to expel all Ottoman troops from Crete, which was accomplished on 6 November 1898. When Prince George of Greece arrived in Crete on 21 December 1898 (9 December according to the Julian calendar) as the first High Commissioner of the autonomous Cretan State, Crete effectively was detached from the Ottoman Empire, although it remained under the Sultan's suzerainty.

== Modern Crete ==
=== Cretan State ===
Flag of the Cretan State (1898–1908)

After the expulsion of Ottoman forces in November 1898, the autonomous Cretan State (Official Greek name: Κρητική Πολιτεία), headed by Prince George of Greece and Denmark, was founded under Ottoman suzerainty in December 1898.

Prince George was replaced by Alexandros Zaimis in 1906, and in 1908, taking advantage of domestic turmoil in Turkey as well as the timing of Zaimis's vacation away from the island, the Cretan deputies declared union with Greece. But this act was not recognized internationally until 1913 after the Balkan Wars when, by the Treaty of London, Sultan Mehmed V relinquished his formal rights to the island.

In December, the Greek flag was raised at the Firkas fortress in Chania, with Eleftherios Venizelos and King Constantine in attendance, and Crete was unified with mainland Greece. The Cretan Turks minority of Crete initially remained on the island but was later relocated to Turkey under the general population exchange agreed upon in the 1923 Treaty of Lausanne between Turkey and Greece.

One of the most important figures to emerge from the end of Ottoman Crete was the liberal politician Eleftherios Venizelos, probably the most important statesman of modern Greece. Venizelos was an Athens-trained lawyer who was active in liberal circles in Chania, then the Cretan capital. After autonomy, he was first a minister in the government of Prince George and then his most formidable opponent.

In 1910 Venizelos transferred his career to Athens, quickly became the dominant figure on the political scene and in 1912, after careful preparations for a military alliance against the Ottoman Empire with Serbia, Montenegro, and Bulgaria, allowed Cretan deputies to take their place in the Greek Parliament. This was treated as grounds for war by Ottoman Empire but the Balkan allies won a series of sweeping victories in the hostilities that followed (see Balkan Wars). Ottoman Empire was effectively defeated in the ensuing war and were forced out of the Balkans and Thrace by the Alliance, except for the borders which Turkey continues to hold to this day.

=== World War II ===
==== Battle of Greece ====
In 1939, the United Kingdom guaranteed military aid to Greece if its territorial integrity was threatened. The priority of the United Kingdom was to prevent Crete from falling into enemy hands, because the island could be used to defend Egypt, the Suez Canal and the route to India. British troops landed on Crete with the consent of the Greek Government from 3 November 1940, in order to make the 5th Greek Division of Crete available for the Albanian front.

The invasion of mainland Greece by the Axis powers began on 6 April 1941 and was complete within a few weeks despite the intervention of the armies of the Commonwealth along with Greece. King George II and the Government of Emmanouil Tsouderos were forced to flee Athens and took refuge in Crete on April 23. Crete was also the refuge of Commonwealth troops that fled from the beaches of Attica and the Peloponnese to Crete to organize a new front of resistance.

==== Battle of Crete ====
After the conquest of mainland Greece, Germany turned to Crete and the last stage of the Balkans campaign. After a fierce and bloody conflict between Nazi Germany and the Allies (United Kingdom, New Zealand, Australia, and Greece) that lasted ten days (between the 20 and 31 May 1941), the island fell to the Germans.

On the morning of 20 May 1941, Crete was the theater of the first major airborne assault in history. The Third Reich launched an airborne invasion of Crete under the code name of "Operation Mercury". 17,000 paratroopers under the command of General Kurt Student were dropped at three strategic locations with airfields: Maleme, Heraklion, and Rethymnon. Their goal was the capture and control of the three airfields to allow the arrival of reinforcements airlifted by the Luftwaffe from mainland Greece to bypass the Royal Navy and the Hellenic Navy who still controlled the seas.

On 1 June 1941 the Allies completely evacuated the island of Crete. Despite the victory of the German invaders, the elite German paratroopers suffered such heavy losses, from the resistance of the Allied troops and civilians, that Adolf Hitler forbade further airborne operations of such large scale for the rest of the war.

==== The Cretan Resistance ====
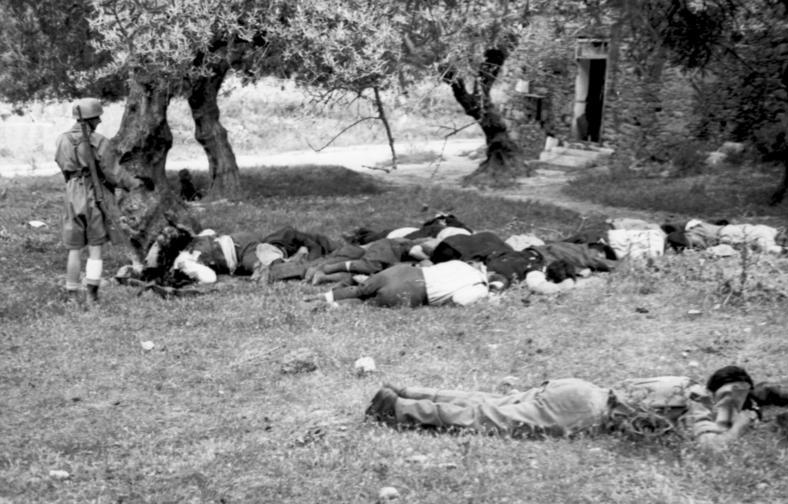
Murder of Greek civilians in Kondomari by German paratroopers in 1941

From the first days of the invasion, the local population organized a resistance movement, participating widely in guerrilla groups and intelligence networks. The first resistance groups formed in the Cretan mountains as early as June 1941. In September 1943, a memorable battle between the troops of occupation resistance fighters led by "Kapetan" Manolis Bandouvas in the region of Syme resulted in the deaths of eighty-three German soldiers and another thirteen were taken as prisoners. There were reprisals for resistance, German officers routinely used firing squads against Cretan civilians and razed villages to the ground. Standing out amongst the atrocities, are the holocausts of Viannos and Kedros in Amari, the destruction of Anogeia and Kandanos and the massacre of Kondomari.

==== Liberation ====
By late 1944 German forces were withdrawing from Greece to avoid being cut off by the advancing Russian army moving west across Europe. By the end of September, German and Italian troops began withdrawing from Crete. A small force of British troops landed on Crete on October 13, and both Rethymno and Heraklion were liberated as the occupying forces were withdrawn to the Chania area.

Following VE Day British SOE officer Dennis Ciclitira arranged for Generalmajor Hans-Georg Benthack to formally surrender all German forces on the island to Major-General Colin Callander. On May 9, 1945, Benthack signed an unconditional surrender at the Villa Ariadne at Knossos to Callander, effective "10 o'clock Greenwich Mean Time on the tenth day of May 1945"

=== Civil War ===
In the aftermath of the Dekemvriana in Athens, Cretan leftists were targeted by the right wing paramilitary organization National Organization of Rethymno (EOR), which engaged in attacks in the villages of Koxare and Melampes, as well as Rethymno in January 1945. Those attacks did not escalate into a full scale insurgency as they did in the Greek mainland and the Cretan ELAS did not surrender its weapons after the Treaty of Varkiza. The Cretan branch of the Greek Communist Party (KKE) was well aware that the island was unsuitable for a long scale insurgency due to its isolation from the mainland and the popularity of Venizelism and conservative politics among its population. The presence of numerous bandits, escaped convicts and armed deserters in the countryside further complicated the situation. An uneasy truce was maintained until 1947, with a series of arrests of notable communists in Chania and Heraklion. This was followed with the mass arming of right leaning villagers and creation of the first Cretan MAY units which were led by Bandouvas in Heraklion and "Kapetan" Gyparis in Chania. Encouraged by orders from the central organization in Athens, KKE launched an insurgency in Crete; marking the beginning of the Greek Civil War on the island. In eastern Crete the Democratic Army of Greece (DSE) struggled to establish its presence in Dikti and Psilorites, after continuously clashing with local bandits, armed peasants and army units. The summer season severely limited the number of available water sources for the rebels, further limiting the space available for their maneuvers. On 1 July 1947, the surviving 55 fighters of DSE were ambushed south of Psilorites during an attempt to relocate to Mount Kedros. Commander Giannis Podias was killed and decapitated, the few surviving members of the unit managed to join the rest of DSE in Lefka Ori.

The Lefka Ori region in the west offered more favorable conditions for DSE's insurgency. In the summer of 1947 DSE raided the Maleme Airport, looting its warehouses and abducting 100 aircraftmen of the Royal Hellenic Air Force, 12 of whom joined the rebels. On 4 July 1947, DSE struck a former German motor depot at Chrysopigi on the outskirts of Chania. DSE abducted the depot's guards, looted the warehouse and set it aflame; resulting in a big explosion that led to the mobilization of government troops across the island. Following the destruction of the DSE units in the east, Cretan DSE numbered around 300 fighters. Crop failure during 1947 had created food shortages in Crete which were much more severe among the rebels who lacked access to the cities. The communists resorted to cattle rustling and confiscated 70,000 okades of potatoes from the village of Lakkoi. This solved supply shortages only temporarily and the communists struggled to enforce discipline on their recruits or dislodge the mountain bandits residing in the areas under their nominal control. In the autumn of 1947, the Greek government offered generous amnesty terms to Cretan DSE fighters and mountain bandits, many of whom opted to abandon armed struggle or even defect to the nationalists. On 4 July 1948, government troops launched a large scale offensive on Samariá Gorge. Many DSE soldiers were killed in the fighting while the survivors broke into small armed bands. In October 1948, the secretary of the Cretan KKE Giorgos Tsitilos was killed in an ambush. By the following month only 34 DSE fighters remained active in Lefka Ori. The insurgency in Crete gradually withered away, with the last two hold outs surrendering in 1974, 25 years after the conclusion of the war in mainland Greece.

== Other notable historical events ==
=== Cretan School of Art ===
An important school of icon painting, under the umbrella of post-Byzantine art with Latin influences, which flourished while Crete was under Venetian rule during the late Middle Ages, reaching its climax after the Fall of Constantinople, becoming the central force in Greek painting during the 15th, 16th and 17th centuries.

=== Cretan literature ===
Due to the economic and intellectual growth observed in Crete during the Venetian era, Cretan literature was rich in quantity and quality and important for the subsequent course of Modern Greek literature. The peaceful living and contact with a developed intellectual and cultural people were the factors that contributed to the cultivation of education and literature and the emergence of remarkable literary production.

=== The Black Death ===
As a result of plagues of the Black Death, many Cretans migrated overseas during difficult periods on the island, some acquiring great fortune abroad, such as Constantine Corniaktos (c. 1517–1603) who became one of the richest people in Eastern Europe.

== See also ==
- Cretan Revolt
- History of Greece
  - Neolithic Greece
- List of rulers of Crete
