= Cretan otter =

Cretan otter Temporal range: Late Pleistocene0.126–0.012 Ma

Scientific classification
- Kingdom: Animalia
- Phylum: Chordata
- Class: Mammalia
- Infraclass: Placentalia
- Order: Carnivora
- Family: Mustelidae
- Genus: Lutrogale
- Species: †L. cretensis

Binomial name
- †Lutrogale cretensis (Symeonides & Sondaar, 1975)

Synonyms
- Isolalutra cretensis

Extinct species of otter

The Cretan otter (Lutrogale cretensis) is an extinct otter that was endemic to Crete during the Pleistocene.

== Taxonomy ==
It was a close relative of the smooth-coated otter (L. perspicillata), whom today lives only in southern Asia but had a wider distribution in the past.

The Cretan otter is the only carnivoran known from the Pleistocene of Crete. Its remains are known from only one locality (Liko Cave).

== Description ==
The Cretan otter was similar in length to the smooth-coated otter, around 1 m (3.3 ft) long, but was more robustly built and slightly heavier.

The Cretan otter shows more terrestrial adaptations than both the smooth-coated otter and the Eurasian otter, though not to the extent seen in otters of the genus Aonyx. Its skeleton combines a number of adaptations to terrestrial locomotion (e.g. the position of the teres major and the sacropelvic angle), with clear aquatic adaptations (e.g. the ratio of ilium and ischiopubis length, the large feet and somewhat flattened tail to facilitate fast underwater swimming).

This change in lifestyle likely arose due to the special conditions (such as lack of rivers) on Crete.
