= Insular dwarfism =

Form of phyletic dwarfism occurring on islands

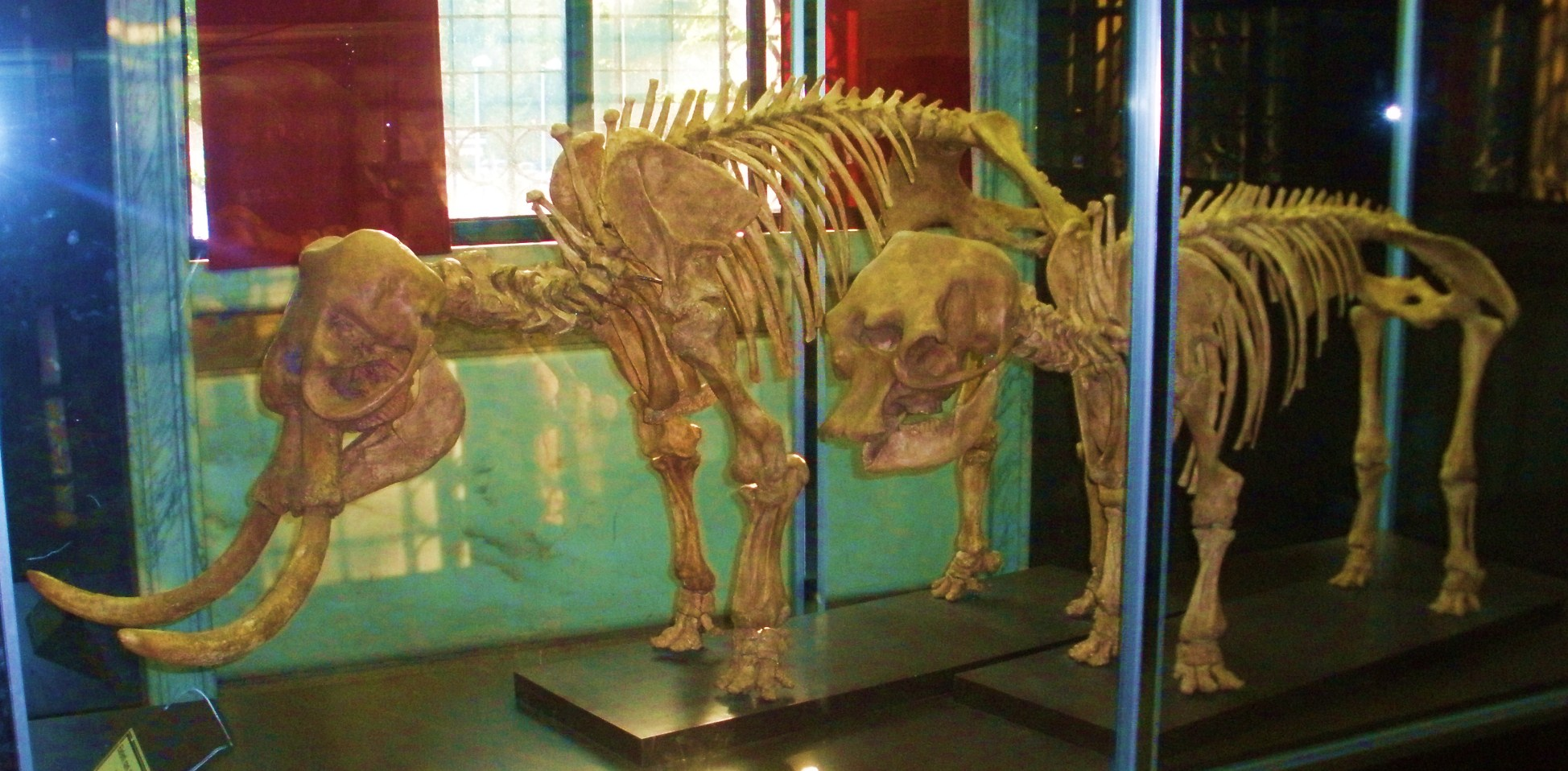
Skeletons of the extinct Palaeoloxodon falconeri, native to Sicily and Malta, it is one of the smallest known species of dwarf elephant. Adult males measured about one meter (3.3 ft) in shoulder height and weighed about 250 kg (550 lb). Females were smaller.

Insular dwarfism, a form of phyletic dwarfism, is the process and condition of large animals evolving or having a reduced body size (Note: An example of noninsular phyletic dwarfism is the evolution of the dwarfed marmosets and tamarins among New World monkeys, culminating in the appearance of the smallest example, Cebuella pygmaea.) when their population's range is limited to a small environment, primarily islands. This natural process is distinct from the intentional creation of dwarf breeds, called dwarfing. This process has occurred many times throughout evolutionary history, with examples including various species of dwarf elephants that evolved during the Pleistocene epoch, as well as more ancient examples, such as the dinosaurs Europasaurus and Magyarosaurus. This process, and other "island genetics" artifacts, can occur not only on islands, but also in other situations where an ecosystem is isolated from external resources and breeding. This can include caves, desert oases, isolated valleys and isolated mountains ("sky islands").

Insular dwarfism is one aspect of the more general "island effect" or "Foster's rule", which posits that when mainland animals colonize islands, small species tend to evolve larger bodies (island gigantism), and large species tend to evolve smaller bodies. This is itself one aspect of island syndrome, which describes the differences in morphology, ecology, physiology and behaviour of insular species compared to their continental counterparts. Arguably the most famous case is that of the Shetland pony, an animal only half the height of its parent species, although this, through both artificial breeding and its presence on the Shetland Islands to begin with, may partially be the work of man.

== Possible causes ==
A qualitative digram representing the interdynamics of possible factors that collectively produces insular dwarfism.

There are several proposed explanations for the mechanism which produces such dwarfism.

One is a selective process where only smaller animals trapped on the island survive, as food periodically declines to a borderline level. The smaller animals need fewer resources and smaller territories, and so are more likely to get past the break-point where population decline allows food sources to replenish enough for the survivors to flourish. Smaller size is also advantageous from a reproductive standpoint, as it entails shorter gestation periods and generation times.

In the tropics, small size should make thermoregulation easier.

Among herbivores, large size confers advantages in coping with both competitors and predators, so a reduction or absence of either would facilitate dwarfing; competition appears to be the more important factor.

Among carnivores, the main factor is thought to be the size and availability of prey resources, and competition is believed to be less important. In tiger snakes, insular dwarfism occurs on islands where available prey is restricted to smaller sizes than are normally taken by mainland snakes. Since prey size preference in snakes is generally proportional to body size, small snakes may be better adapted to take small prey.

== Differences of dwarfism and gigantism ==
The inverse process, wherein small animals breeding on isolated islands lacking the predators of large land masses may become much larger than normal, is called island gigantism. An excellent example is the dodo, the ancestors of which were normal-sized pigeons. There are also several species of giant rats, one still extant, that coexisted with both Homo floresiensis and the dwarf stegodonts on Flores.

The process of insular dwarfing can occur relatively rapidly by evolutionary standards. This is in contrast to increases in maximum body size, which are much more gradual. When normalized to generation length, the maximum rate of body mass decrease during insular dwarfing was found to be over 30 times greater than the maximum rate of body mass increase for a ten-fold change in mammals. The disparity is thought to reflect the fact that pedomorphism offers a relatively easy route to evolve smaller adult body size; on the other hand, the evolution of larger maximum body size is likely to be interrupted by the emergence of a series of constraints that must be overcome by evolutionary innovations before the process can continue.

== Factors influencing the extent of dwarfing ==
For both herbivores and carnivores, island size, the degree of island isolation and the size of the ancestral continental species appear not to be of major direct importance to the degree of dwarfing. However, when considering only the body masses of recent top herbivores and carnivores, and including data from both continental and island land masses, the body masses of the largest species in a land mass were found to scale to the size of the land mass, with slopes of about 0.5 log(body mass/kg) per log(land area/km^{2}). There were separate regression lines for endothermic top predators, ectothermic top predators, endothermic top herbivores and (on the basis of limited data) ectothermic top herbivores, such that food intake was 7- to 24-fold higher for top herbivores than for top predators, and about the same for endotherms and ectotherms of the same trophic level (this leads to ectotherms being 5 to 16 times heavier than corresponding endotherms).

It has been suggested that for dwarf elephants, competition was an important factor in body size, with islands with competing herbivores having significantly larger dwarf elephants than those where competing herbivores were absent.

== Examples ==
=== Non-avian dinosaurs ===
Recognition that insular dwarfism could apply to dinosaurs arose through the work of Ferenc Nopcsa, a Hungarian-born aristocrat, adventurer, scholar, and paleontologist. Nopcsa studied Transylvanian dinosaurs intensively, noticing that they were smaller than their cousins elsewhere in the world. For example, he unearthed six-meter-long sauropods, a group of dinosaurs which elsewhere commonly grew to 30 meters or more. Nopcsa deduced that the area where the remains were found was an island, Hațeg Island (now the Haţeg or Hatzeg basin in Romania) during the Mesozoic era. Nopcsa's proposal of dinosaur dwarfism on Hațeg Island is today widely accepted after further research confirmed that the remains found are not from juveniles.

==== Sauropods ====
Example	Species	Range	Time frame	Continental relative
Ampelosaurus	A. atacis	Ibero-Armorican Island	Late Cretaceous / Maastrichtian	Nemegtosaurids
Europasaurus	E. holgeri	Lower Saxony	Late Jurassic / Middle Kimmeridgian	Brachiosaurs
Magyarosaurus	M. dacus	Hațeg Island	Late Cretaceous / Maastrichtian	Rapetosaurus
Lirainosaurus	L. astibiae	Ibero-Armorican Island	Late Cretaceous	Rapetosaurus
Paludititan	P. nalatzensis	Hațeg Island	Late Cretaceous / Maastrichtian	Epachthosaurus

==== Other ====
Example	Species	Range	Time frame	Continental relative
Langenberg Quarry torvosaur (blue)	Unnamed	Lower Saxony	Late Jurassic / Middle Kimmeridgian	Torvosaurus
Struthiosaurus	S. austriacus	Ibero-Armorican, Australoalpine, and Hațeg Islands	Late Cretaceous	Edmontonia
Struthiosaurus	S. transylvanicus	Ibero-Armorican, Australoalpine, and Hațeg Islands	Late Cretaceous	Edmontonia
Struthiosaurus	S. languedocensis	Ibero-Armorican, Australoalpine, and Hațeg Islands	Late Cretaceous	Edmontonia
Telmatosaurus	T. transsylvanicus	Hațeg Island	Late Cretaceous	Hadrosaurids
Thecodontosaurus	T. antiquus	Southern England	Late Triassic / Rhaetian	Plateosaurs
Zalmoxes (purple)	Z. robustus	Hațeg Island	Late Cretaceous	Tenontosaurus
Zalmoxes (purple)	Z. shqiperorum	Hațeg Island	Late Cretaceous	Tenontosaurus

In addition, the genus Balaur was initially described as a Velociraptor-sized dromaeosaurid (and in consequence a dubious example of insular dwarfism), but has been since reclassified as a secondarily flightless stem bird, closer to modern birds than Jeholornis (thus actually an example of insular gigantism).

=== Birds ===
Example	Binomial name	Native range	Status	Continental relative	Insular / mainland length or mass ratio
Hawaiian flightless ibises	Apteribis glenos	Molokai	Extinct (Late Quaternary)	American ibises	
Hawaiian flightless ibises	Apteribis brevis	Maui	Extinct (Late Quaternary)	American ibises	
Cozumel curassow	Crax rubra griscomi	Cozumel	Unknown	Great curassow	
Kangaroo Island emu	Dromaius novaehollandiae baudinianus	Kangaroo Island, South Australia	Extinct (c. AD 1827)	Emu	
King Island emu (black)	Dromaius novaehollandiae minor	King Island, Tasmania	Extinct (AD 1822)	Emu	LR ≈ 0.48 (Note: Based on the heights in Fig. 1 of Heupink et al., 2011)
Dwarf yellow eyed penguin	Megadyptes antipodes richdalei	Chatham Islands, New Zealand	Extinct (after 1300 AD)	Yellow-eyed penguin	
Cozumel thrasher	Toxostoma gluttatum	Cozumel	Critically endangered	Other thrashers	

=== Squamates ===
Example	Binomial name	Native range	Status	Continental relative	Insular / mainland length or mass ratio
Madagascar dwarf chameleon	Brookesia minima	Nosy Be island, Madagascar	Endangered	Madagascar leaf chameleons	
Nosy Hara chameleon	Brookesia micra	Nosy Hara island, Madagascar	Vulnerable	Madagascar leaf chameleons	
Roxby Island tiger snake	Notechis scutatus	Roxby Island, South Australia	Unknown	Tiger snake	
Dwarf Burmese python	Python bivittatus progschai	Java, Bali, Sumbawa and Sulawesi, Indonesia	Unknown	Burmese python	LR ≈ 0.44 (Note: Based on maximum lengths of 2.5 m for the dwarf form and 5.74 m for the mainland form)
Tanahjampea reticulated python	Python reticulatus jampeanus	Tanahjampea, between Sulawesi and Flores	Unknown	Reticulated python	LR ≈ 0.41, males LR ≈ 0.49, females (Note: Based on maximum Tanahjampea python total lengths (TL) of 2.10 m for males and 3.35 m for females and maximum southern Sumatra python snout to vent lengths (SVL) of 4.5 m for males and 6.1 m for females with SVLs corrected to TLs by multiplying by a factor of 1.127, derived from the average relative tail length (0.113) of African and Indian rock pythons)

=== Mammals ===
==== Pilosans ====
Example	Binomial name	Native range	Status	Continental relative
Pygmy three-toed sloth	Bradypus pygmaeus	Isla Escudo de Veraguas, Panama	Critically endangered	Brown-throated sloth
Acratocnus	A. antillensis	Cuba, Hispaniola and Puerto Rico	Extinct (c. 3000 BC)	Continental ground sloths
Acratocnus	A. odontrigonus	Cuba, Hispaniola and Puerto Rico	Extinct (c. 3000 BC)	Continental ground sloths
Acratocnus	A. ye	Cuba, Hispaniola and Puerto Rico	Extinct (c. 3000 BC)	Continental ground sloths
Imagocnus	I. zazae	Cuba	Extinct (Early Miocene)	Continental ground sloths
Megalocnus	M. rodens	Cuba and Hispaniola	Extinct (c. 2700 BC)	Continental ground sloths
Megalocnus	M. zile	Cuba and Hispaniola	Extinct (c. 2700 BC)	Continental ground sloths
Neocnus	Neocnus spp.	Cuba and Hispaniola	Extinct (c. 3000 BC)	Continental ground sloths

==== Proboscideans ====
Example	Binomial name	Native range	Status	Continental relative	
Sulawesi dwarf elephant	Elephas celebensis	Sulawesi	Extinct (Early Pleistocene)	Asian elephant	
Cabarruyan dwarf elephant	Elephas beyeri	Luzon	Extinct	Asian elephant	
Cretan dwarf mammoth	Mammuthus creticus	Crete	Extinct	Mammuthus	
Channel Islands mammoth	Mammuthus exilis	Santa Rosae island	Extinct (Late Pleistocene)	Columbian mammoth	
Sardinian mammoth	Mammuthus lamarmorai	Sardinia	Extinct (Late Pleistocene)	Steppe mammoth	
Taiwan mammoth	Mammuthus trogontherii taiwanicus	Taiwan	Extinct	Steppe mammoth	
Saint Paul Island woolly mammoth	Mammuthus primigenius	Saint Paul Island, Alaska	Extinct (c. 3750 BC)	Woolly mammoth	
Siculo-Maltese elephants	Palaeoloxodon antiquus leonardi	Sicily and Malta	Extinct	Straight-tusked elephant (left)	
Siculo-Maltese elephants	P. mnaidriensis	Sicily and Malta	Extinct	Straight-tusked elephant (left)	
Siculo-Maltese elephants	P. melitensis	Sicily and Malta	Extinct	Straight-tusked elephant (left)	
Siculo-Maltese elephants	P. falconeri	Sicily and Malta	Extinct	Straight-tusked elephant (left)	
Cretan elephants	P. creutzburgi	Crete	Extinct	Straight-tusked elephant (left)	
Cyprus dwarf elephant	Palaeoloxodon cypriotes	Cyprus	Extinct	Straight-tusked elephant (left)	Extinct (c. 9000 BC)
Naxos dwarf elephant	Palaeoloxodon sp.	Naxos	Extinct	Straight-tusked elephant (left)	
Tilos dwarf elephant	Palaeoloxodon tiliensis	Tilos	Extinct	Straight-tusked elephant (left)	
Rhodes dwarf elephant	Palaeoloxodon sp.	Rhodes	Extinct	Straight-tusked elephant (left)	
Bumiayu dwarf sinomastodont	Sinomastodon bumiajuensis	Bumiayu Island (now part of Java)	Extinct (Early Pleistocene)	Straight-tusked elephant (left)	Sinomastodon
Japanese stegodont	Stegodon miensis	Japan (Also Taiwan for S. aurorae)	Extinct (Early Pleistocene)	Chinese Stegodon	
Japanese stegodont	Stegodon protoaurorae	Japan (Also Taiwan for S. aurorae)	Extinct (Early Pleistocene)	Chinese Stegodon	
Japanese stegodont	Stegodon aurorae	Japan (Also Taiwan for S. aurorae)	Extinct (Early Pleistocene)	Chinese Stegodon	
Greater Flores dwarf stegodont	Stegodon florensis	Flores	Extinct (Late Pleistocene)	Sundaland Stegodon	
Javan dwarf stegodonts	Stegodon hypsilophus	Java	Extinct (Quaternary)	Sundaland Stegodon	
Javan dwarf stegodonts	S. semedoensis	Java	Extinct (Quaternary)	Sundaland Stegodon	
Javan dwarf stegodonts	S. sp.	Java	Extinct (Quaternary)	Sundaland Stegodon	
Mindanao pygmy stegodont	Stegodon mindanensis	Mindanao and Sulawesi	Extinct (Middle Pleistocene)	Sundaland Stegodon	
Sulawesi dwarf stegodont	Stegodon sompoensis	Sulawesi	Extinct	Sundaland Stegodon	
Lesser Flores dwarf stegodont	Stegodon sondaari	Flores	Extinct (Middle Pleistocene)	Sundaland Stegodon	
Sumba dwarf stegodont	Stegodon sumbaensis	Sumba, Indonesia	Extinct (Middle Pleistocene)	Sundaland Stegodon	
Timor dwarf stegodont	Stegodon timorensis	Timor	Extinct	Sundaland Stegodon	
Dwarf stegolophodont	Stegolophodon pseudolatidens	Japan	Extinct (Miocene)	Stegolophodon	

==== Primates ====
Example	Binomial name	Native range	Status	Continental relative
Nosy Hara dwarf lemur	Cheirogaleus sp.	Nosy Hara island off Madagascar	Unknown	Dwarf lemurs
Flores Man	Homo floresiensis	Flores	Extinct (Late Pleistocene)	Homo erectus
Callao Man	Homo luzonensis	Luzon, Philippines	Extinct (Late Pleistocene)	Homo erectus
Modern pygmies of Flores	Homo sapiens	Flores	Extant	other members of Homo sapiens
Early Palau modern humans (disputed)	Homo sapiens	Palau	Extinct (?)	other members of Homo sapiens
Andamanese	Homo sapiens	Andaman Islands	Extant	other members of Homo sapiens
Sardinian macaque	Macaca majori	Sardinia	Extinct (Pleistocene)	Barbary macaque
Zanzibar red colobus	Piliocolobus kirkii	Unguja	Endangered	Udzungwa red colobus

==== Carnivorans ====
Example	Binomial name	Native range	Status	Continental relative	Insular / mainland length or mass ratio
Sicilian wolf	Canis lupus cristaldii	Sicily	Extinct (AD 1970)	Gray wolf	
Japanese wolf	Canis lupus hodophilax	Japan (excluding Hokkaido)	Extinct (AD 1905)	Gray wolf	
Sardinian dhole (forward)	Cynotherium sardous	Corsica and Sardinia	Extinct (c. 8300 BC)	Xenocyon	
Trinil dog	Mececyon trinilensis	Java	Extinct (Pleistocene)	Xenocyon	
Cozumel coati	Nasua narica nelsoni	Cozumel	Critically endangered	Yucatan white-nosed coati	
Zanzibar leopard	Panthera pardus pardus	Unguja	Critically endangered or Extinct	African leopard	
Taiwan leopard	Panthera pardus	Taiwan	Extinct (Pleistocene)	Amur leopard	
Bali tiger	Panthera tigris sondaica	Bali	Extinct (c. AD 1940)	Sumatran tiger	
Javan tiger	Panthera tigris sondaica	Java	Extinct (c. AD 1975)	Sumatran tiger	
Cozumel raccoon	Procyon pygmaeus	Cozumel	Critically endangered	Raccoon	
Island fox	Urocyon littoralis	Six of the Channel Islands of California	Near Threatened	Gray fox	LR ≈ 0.84 (Note: For nearby mainland gray foxes); LR ≈ 0.75 (Note: For mainland gray foxes in general)
Cozumel fox	Urocyon sp.	Cozumel	Critically endangered or Extinct	Gray fox	

==== Non-ruminant ungulates ====
Example	Binomial name	Native range	Status	Continental relative
Eumaiochoerus	Eumaiochoerus etruscus	Baccinello, Montebamboli	Extinct (Miocene)	Microstonyx
Malagasy dwarf hippopotamuses	Hippopotamus laloumena	Madagascar	Extinct (c. AD 1000)	Hippopotamus
Malagasy dwarf hippopotamuses	H. lemerlei	Madagascar	Extinct (c. AD 1000)	Hippopotamus
Malagasy dwarf hippopotamuses	H. madagascariensis	Madagascar	Extinct (c. AD 1000)	Hippopotamus
Bumiayu dwarf hippopotamus	Hexaprotodon simplex	Bumiayu Island (now Java)	Extinct (Early Pleistocene)	Asian hippopotamuses
Cretan dwarf hippopotamus	Hippopotamus creutzburgi	Crete	Extinct (Middle Pleistocene)	Hippopotamus antiquus
Maltese dwarf hippopotamus	Hippopotamus melitensis	Malta	Extinct (Pleistocene)	Hippopotamus (H. amphibius)
Sicilian dwarf hippopotamus	Hippopotamus pentlandi	Sicily	Extinct (Pleistocene)	Hippopotamus (H. amphibius)
Cypriot pygmy hippopotamus	Hippopotamus minor	Cyprus	Extinct (c. 8000 BC)	Unclear, either H. amphibius or H. antiquus.
Cozumel collared peccary	Pecari tajacu nanus	Cozumel	Unknown	Collared peccary

==== Bovids ====
Example	Binomial name	Native range	Status	Continental relative
Sicilian bison	Bison priscus siciliae	Sicily	Extinct (Late Pleistocene)	Steppe bison
Sicilian aurochs	Bos primigenius siciliae	Sicily	Extinct (Late Pleistocene)	Eurasian aurochs
Cebu tamaraw	Bubalus cebuensis	Cebu, Philippines	Extinct	Wild water buffalo
Lowland anoa	Bubalus depressicornis	Sulawesi and Buton, Indonesia	Endangered	Wild water buffalo
Bubalus grovesi	Bubalus grovesi	Sulawesi, Indonesia	Extinct	Wild water buffalo
Tamaraw	Bubalus mindorensis	Mindoro, Philippines	Critically endangered	Wild water buffalo
Mountain anoa	Bubalus quarlesi	Sulawesi and Buton, Indonesia	Endangered	Wild water buffalo
Balearic Islands cave goat	Myotragus balearicus	Mallorca and Menorca	Extinct (after 3000 BC)	Gallogoral
Nesogoral	Nesogoral spp.	Sardinia	Extinct	Gallogoral
Dahlak Kebir gazelle	Nanger soemmerringi ssp.	Dahlak Kebir island, Eritrea	Vulnerable	Soemmerring's gazelle
Tyrrhenotragus	Tyrrhenotragus gracillimus	Baccinello	Extinct	Antilopinae sp.

==== Cervids and relatives ====
Example	Binomial name	Native range	Status	Continental relative
Cretan deer (Note: Like Hoplitomeryx, Candiacervus appears to be an unusual case in that members of this genus evolved into insular species of a wide range of sizes, not only dwarf forms but also some that might be considered giants.)	Candiacervus spp.	Crete	Extinct (Pleistocene)	Unknown
Sardinian deer	Praemegaceros cazioti	Sardinia	Extinct (c. 5500 BC)	Praemegaceros
Ryukyu dwarf deer	Cervus astylodon	Ryukyu Islands	Extinct	Sika deer (?)
Ryukyu dwarf deer	Cervus astylodon	Ryukyu Islands	Extinct	Cervus praenipponicus (?)
Jersey red deer population	Cervus elaphus jerseyensis	Jersey	Extinct (Pleistocene)	Red deer
Corsican red deer	Cervus elaphus corsicanus	Corsica and Sardinia	Near Threatened	Red deer
Sicilian red deer	Cervus siciliae	Sicily	Extinct (Late Pleistocene)	Red deer
Hoplitomeryx (Note: Hoplitomeryx is evidently quite an unusual case, because members of this genus apparently evolved into both dwarf and giant insular forms on the same island(s).)	Hoplitomeryx spp.	Gargano Island	Extinct (Early Pliocene)	Pecorans
Sicilian fallow deer	Dama carburangelensis	Sicily	Extinct (Late Pleistocene)	Fallow deer
Florida Key deer	Odocoileus virginianus clavium	Florida Keys	Endangered	White-tailed deer
Svalbard reindeer	Rangifer tarandus platyrhynchus	Svalbard	Vulnerable	Reindeer
Philippine deer	Rusa marianna	Philippines	Vulnerable	Sambar deer

=== Plants ===
Possible example	Binomial name	Native range	Status	Continental relative
Insular elephant cacti	Pachycereus pringlei	Remote islands in the Sea of Cortez (e.g. Santa Cruz, San Pedro Mártir)	Not evaluated	Mainland elephant cacti

== See also ==
- Island gigantism
- Island syndrome
- Island tameness
- Pleistocene extinctions
