= Angelo Valle =

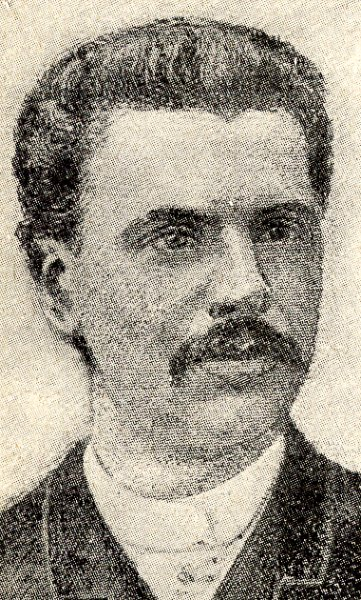

Member of the Chamber of Deputies
- In office 1886–1900
- Constituency: Grosseto (1886–1892), Scansano (1892–1900)

Personal details
- Born: 24 April 1851 Scansano, Grand Duchy of Tuscany
- Died: 12 April 1926 (aged 74) Scansano, Kingdom of Italy

Angelo Valle (24 April 1851 – 12 April 1926) was an Italian politician. Born in Scansano, Valle was first elected to the Chamber of Deputies on 23 May 1886 for the Grosseto constituency during the 16th legislature, alongside Rear Admiral Carlo Alberto Racchia. He was re-elected for the 17th legislature.

In 1892 the Scansano constituency was re-established, and Valle ran in his hometown. He was elected for the 18th legislature with 2,412 votes, defeating Ugo Sorani. He was re-elected for the next two legislatures, remaining in Parliament until May 1900.

Valle died in Scansano on 12 April 1926.

== Sources ==
- Storia dei collegi elettorali 1848–1897. Parte II. Rome: Ministero dell'agricoltura, industria e commercio. 1898. pp. 308–309, 610.
