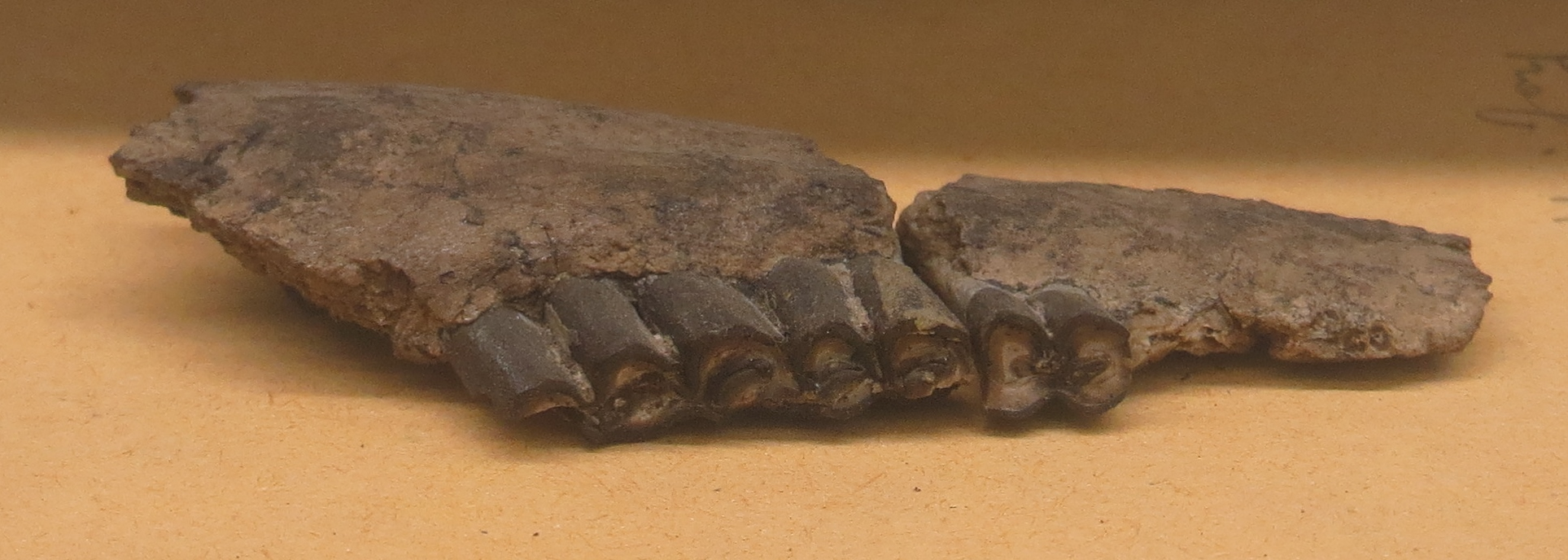
- Tyrrhenotragus gracillimus mandible

Scientific classification
- Domain: Eukaryota
- Kingdom: Animalia
- Phylum: Chordata
- Class: Mammalia
- Order: Artiodactyla
- Family: Bovidae
- Subfamily: Antilopinae
- Genus: †Tyrrhenotragus; Thomas, 1984
- Species: †T. gracillimus

Binomial name
- †Tyrrhenotragus gracillimus (Weithofer, 1888)

Synonyms
- Antilope gracillima Weithofer, 1888

= Tyrrhenotragus =

Tyrrhenotragus Temporal range: Late Miocene 10–8 Ma

Extinct species of bovid

Tyrrhenotragus is an extinct genus of bovid that lived in the Late Miocene of Italy. It contains a single species, Tyrrhenotragus gracillimus. Fossils were of Late Vallesian and Early Turolian age and have been found in Baccinello, which at the time of its existence was an island. T. gracillimus has features that are suggestive of an insular animal adapted to island existence.

== Taxonomy ==
It was first described in 1888 as Antilope gracillima. Tyrrhenotragus was traditionally viewed as a member of the tribe Neotragini, which includes pygmy antelope, and was thought to represent a migration of African bovids into southern Europe. However, some of the features traditionally thought to be derived from shared ancestry with other Neotragini, like small size and short metapodial bones, may have actually evolved independently due to adaptations to an island environment.

== Description ==
Tyrrhenotragus was a very small species of antelope. In addition to small size, it developed other features associated with insular bovids such as ever-growing hypsodont incisors and shortened limbs. Such features are also seen in the more recent Myotragus (Balearic Island goat).

== See also ==
- Eumaiochoerus
- Oreopithecus
