= Phyletic dwarfism =

Evolutional phenomenon

Phyletic dwarfism is the decrease in average size of animals of a species. There are a few circumstances that often lead to species doing this. Lack of predators of smaller creatures can allow smaller members of a species to survive. The lack of resources to sustain a large population of larger animals can pick off the largest specimens. Available resources being more beneficial for smaller creatures can also do so.

These circumstances are common on islands, making insular dwarfism the most common form of phyletic dwarfism. Examples of this are the Channel Island fox, extinct dwarf elephants of Crete, and Brookesia micra, a minuscule chameleon from Madagascar. A noninsular example is the evolution of dwarfed marmosets and tamarins among New World monkeys. Phyletic dwarfism may have also helped give rise to birds from their much larger dinosaur ancestors.
