= Poggioferro =

- Frazione
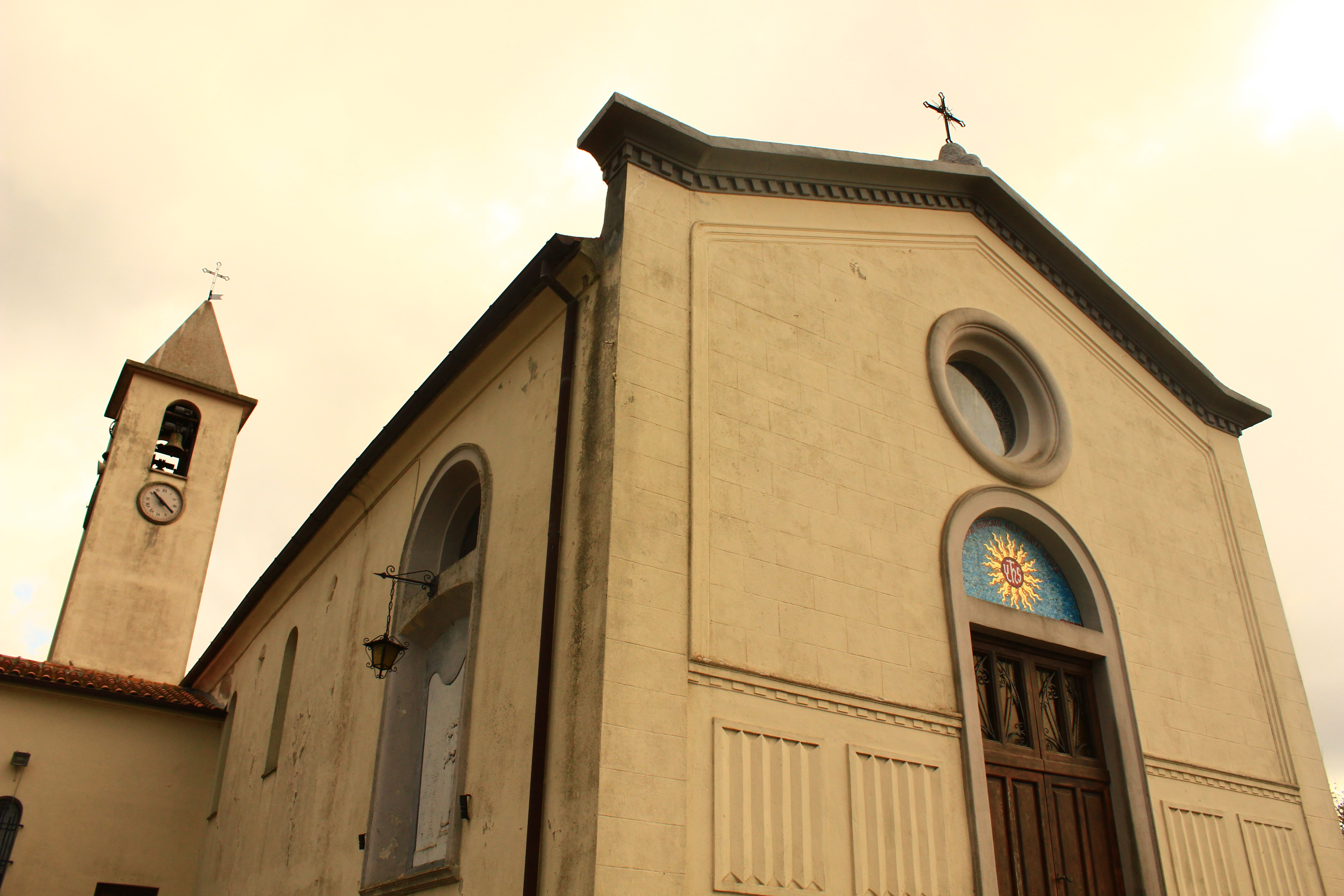
- The church of Santa Croce

- Location of Poggioferro in Italy
- Coordinates: 42°42′7″N 11°22′19″E
- Country: Italy
- Region: Tuscany
- Province: Grosseto (GR)
- Comune: Scansano
- Elevation: 488 m (1,601 ft)

Population (2011)
  - Total: 197
- Demonym: Poggioferrini
- Time zone: UTC+1 (CET)
  - Summer (DST): UTC+2 (CEST)
- Postal code: 58054
- Dialing code: (+39) 0564

Poggioferro is a village in Tuscany, central Italy, administratively a frazione of the comune of Scansano, province of Grosseto. At the time of the 2001 census its population amounted to 205.

Poggioferro is about 32 km from Grosseto and 6 km from Scansano, and it is situated on the hills along the Amiatina Provincial Road.

== Main sights ==
- Santa Croce, main parish church of the village, it was built in 18th century and renovated in 1933.

== Bibliography ==
- Aldo Mazzolai, Guida della Maremma. Percorsi tra arte e natura, Le Lettere, Florence, 1997.
- Giuseppe Guerrini, Torri e castelli della Provincia di Grosseto, Nuova Immagine Editrice, Siena, 1999.

== See also ==
- Baccinello
- Montorgiali
- Murci
- Pancole, Scansano
- Polveraia
- Pomonte, Scansano
- Preselle
