= Polveraia =

- Frazione
- Location of Polveraia in Italy
- Coordinates: 42°46′15″N 11°19′8″E
- Country: Italy
- Region: Tuscany
- Province: Grosseto (GR)
- Comune: Scansano
- Elevation: 272 m (892 ft)

Population (2011)
  - Total: 107
- Demonym: Polveraioli
- Time zone: UTC+1 (CET)
  - Summer (DST): UTC+2 (CEST)
- Postal code: 58054
- Dialing code: (+39) 0564

Polveraia is a village in Tuscany, central Italy, administratively a frazione of the comune of Scansano, province of Grosseto. At the time of the 2001 census its population amounted to 89.

Polveraia is about 23 km from Grosseto and 13 km from Scansano, and it is situated on the hills between Pancole and Baccinello, in the Trasubbie valley.

== Main sights ==
- San Matteo, main parish church of the village, it was built in 1618.
- Madonna delle Grazie, a little church situated in the main street of the village.
- Ancient oil mill of Polveraia (18th century).

== Bibliography ==
- Aldo Mazzolai, Guida della Maremma. Percorsi tra arte e natura, Le Lettere, Florence, 1997.

== See also ==
- Baccinello
- Montorgiali
- Murci
- Pancole, Scansano
- Poggioferro
- Pomonte, Scansano
- Preselle
