= Pitigliano =

- Comune
- Comune di Pitigliano
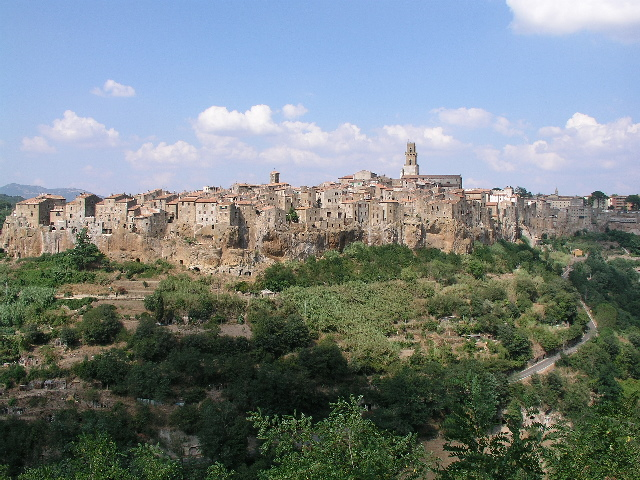

- Coat of arms

- Location within Italy Location within Tuscany
- Coordinates: 42°38′N 11°40′E
- Country: Italy
- Region: Tuscany
- Province: Grosseto (GR)
- Frazioni: Casone

Government
  - Mayor: Giovanni Gentili

Area
  - Total: 101.97 km^{2} (39.37 sq mi)
- Elevation: 313 m (1,027 ft)

Population (1 January 2022)
  - Total: 3,592
  - Density: 35.23/km^{2} (91.24/sq mi)
- Demonym: Pitiglianesi
- Time zone: UTC+1 (CET)
  - Summer (DST): UTC+2 (CEST)
- Postal code: 58017
- Dialing code: 0564
- Patron saint: St. Roch
- Saint day: August 16
- Website: Official website

Pitigliano (Central Italian: Pitiglianu) is a town in the province of Grosseto, located about 80 kilometres (50 mi) south-east of the city of Grosseto, Tuscany, Italy. It is one of I Borghi più belli d'Italia ("The most beautiful villages of Italy").

The town is known as the little Jerusalem, for the historical presence of a Jewish community that has always been well integrated into the social context and that has its own synagogue. It absorbed the nearby town of Sorano's Jewish congregation after emigration in the late 19th century.

The Synagogue was rededicated by a visiting AACI Group from Israel at a service in 2013, led by Rabbi Dr Jeffrey M Cohen, of London.

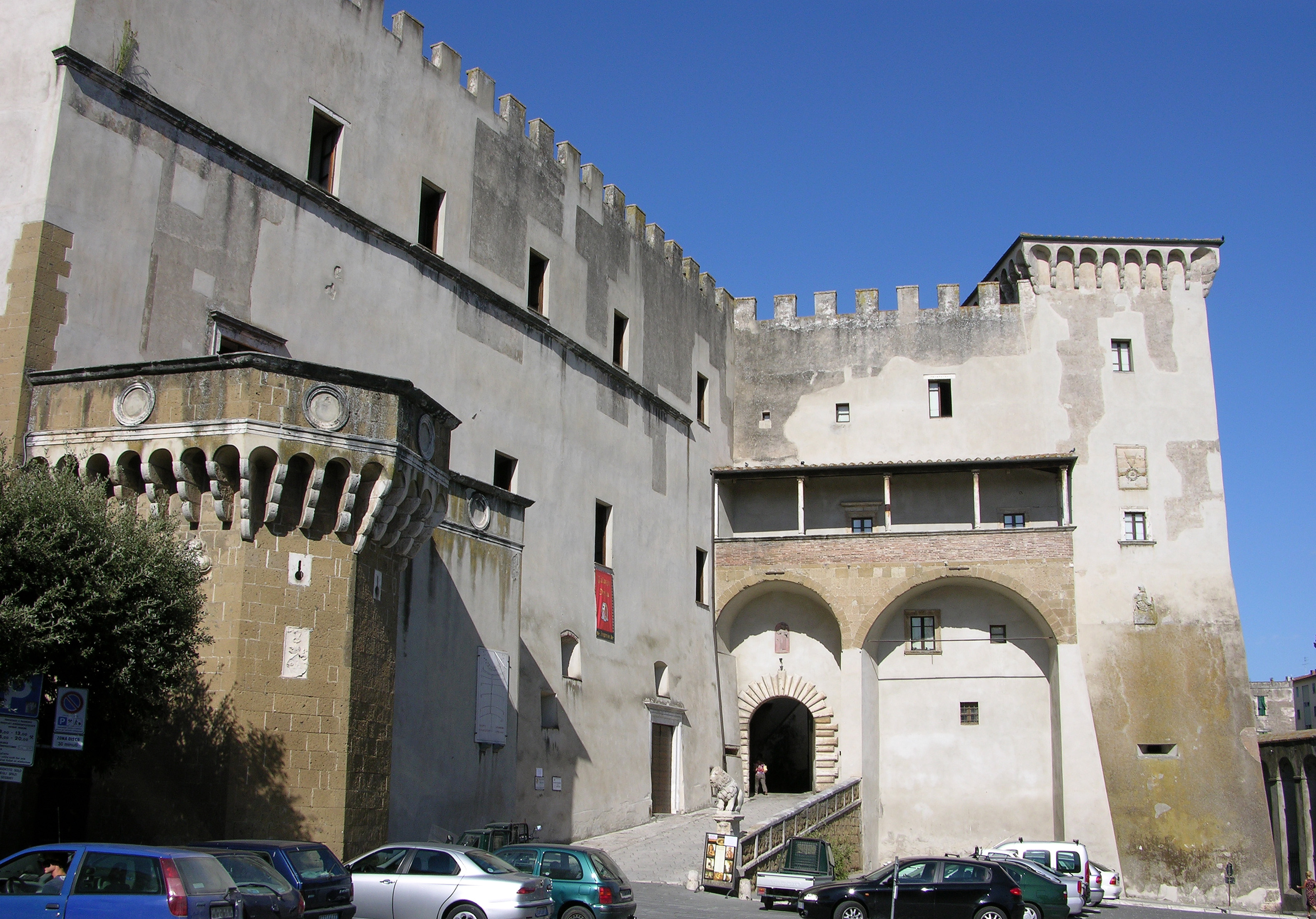
Palazzo Orsini

== History ==
Pitigliano and its area were inhabited in Etruscan times but the first extant written mention of it dates only to 1061. In the early 13th century it belonged to the Aldobrandeschi family and by the middle of the century it had become the capital of the surrounding county. In 1293, the county passed to the Orsini family, signalling the start of 150 years of intermittent wars with Siena, at the end of which, in 1455, a compromise of sorts was reached: Siena acknowledged the status of county to Pitigliano, which in exchange placed herself under the sovereignty of Siena. From then onward, the history of Pitigliano resorbs into the gradually wider ambit first of the Grand Duchy of Tuscany (1562) then of the united Kingdom of Italy.

=== Symbols ===
The coat of arms of Pitigliano features a yellow Samnite shield depicting a silver fortress atop a hill, flanked by two red lions. The official heraldic blazon is: "Or, a crenellated tower argent, supported by two lions combatant gules, each surmounted by a rose of the same, all atop a natural hill." The tower commemorates the Orsini family’s castle, who ruled the territory for nearly four centuries. After Count Giovanni Antonio ceded the fief to Grand Duke Ferdinando I de’ Medici in 1604, the castle motif was encircled by the Medici’s iconic palle (balls). Later, these were removed, and the tower was flanked by the current lions—symbols of the Republic of Siena—each topped with a red rose, borrowed from the Orsini coat of arms. The municipal gonfalon is an azure-blue banner.

=== AI Guidebook ===
A Reddit user discovered that a self-published guidebook purportedly about Pitigliano was written by AI and turned into something generic.

== Climate ==
The municipality area of Pitigliano, while presenting different local situations on the basis of topography is characterized by rather low winter temperatures, which can occur during prolonged periods, despite the daily maximum values are often pleasing. On the contrary, in summer the heat can be very intense, though usually accompanied by low relative humidity.

Consequently, the town has been classified in zone E with a sum of 2195 degree days, allowing the power of heating between October 15 and April 15, up to a maximum of 14 hours per day.

According to data available for the 30-year average 1951–80 for the only weather station located within the municipal area and in the table below, the average annual temperature is about 14.1 °C (57.4 °F) at 313 metres (1,027 ft) above sea level in Pitigliano, while the average annual rainfall is 926 millimetres (36.5 in).

Location	Elevation	Thermodynamic temperature (annual average)	Precipitation (annual average)	Reference average
Pitigliano	313 metres (1,027 ft) above sea level	14.1 °C (57.4 °F)	926 millimetres (36.5 in)	1951–80

- Climate classification: E Zone, 2195 GG
- Atmospheric diffusion: high, Ibimet CNR 2002

== Population ==
=== Synagogue and Jewish community ===
For several hundred years Pitigliano was a frontier town between the Grand Duchy of Tuscany and the Papal States. For this reason, the town was home to a flourishing and long-lived Jewish community, mostly made up by people fleeing from Rome during the Counterreformation persecutions. Jews of the town used one of the caves for their matzah bakery, the forno delle azzime. In the middle of the 19th century the Jews comprised about 20% of the Pitigliano population, but then many Jews moved to the larger cities, and by 1931 the Jewish community only had about 70 members. During Holocaust, all the remaining Jews of the town reportedly escaped capture with the help of their Christian neighbors. Although there are almost no Jews left in town, not enough for a minyan, the synagogue (built in 1598, with furnishings of the 17th and 18th centuries) is still officiated from time to time. It was restored in 1995.

== Main sights ==
=== Etruscan remains ===
Pitigliano is home to a series of artificial cuts into the tuff rock to varying depths ranging from less than 1 metre (3.3 ft) to over 10 metres (33 ft). At the bottom of these cuts (Italian: tagliate) are carved channels, apparently for water, although some take the form of steps. The purpose of the cuts is not known. The three main theories are that they were roads, quarries, or water conveyance schemes; they radiate outward from the base of the butte of Pitigliano, down to the rivers then back to the top of the plateau that surrounds the town. Numerous vases and artifacts have been recovered from the Poggio Buco necropolis.

Medieval and Renaissance structures

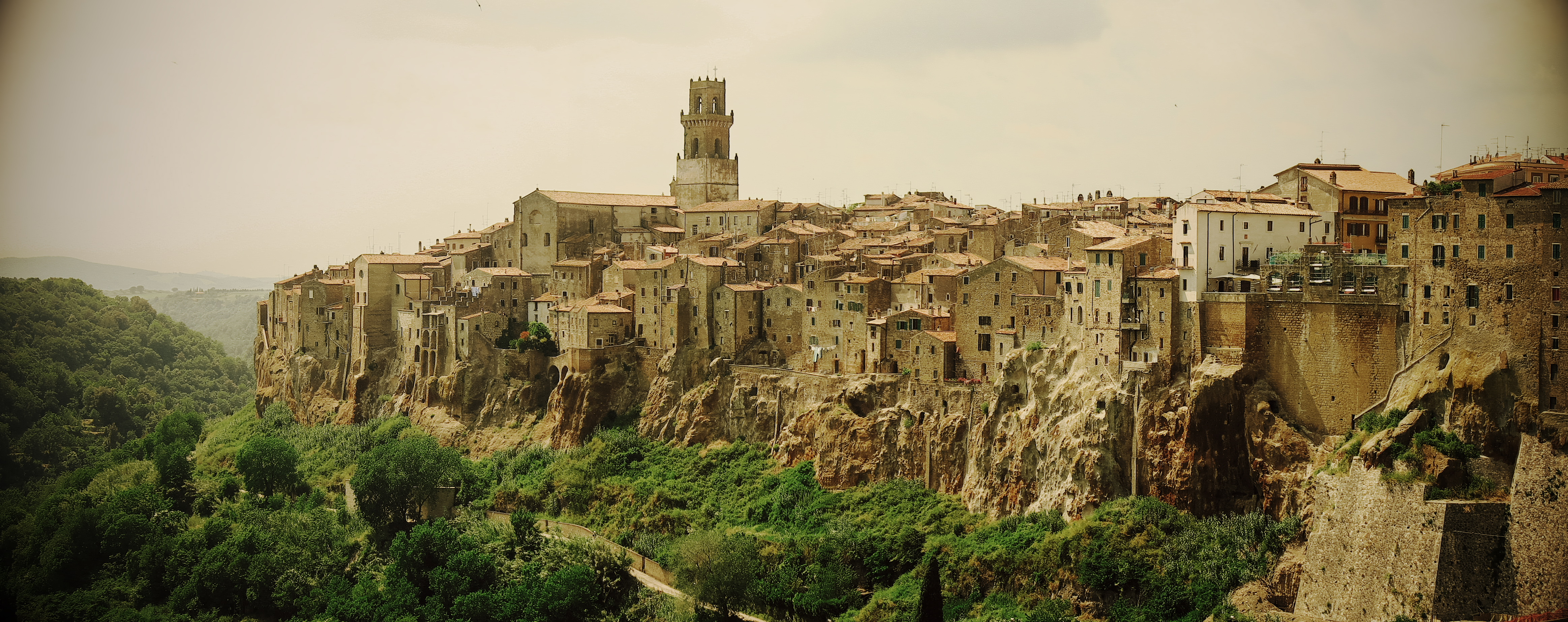
Pitigliano

- The Cathedral of Santi Pietro e Paolo, Pitigliano.
- The church of Santa Maria.
- The Orsini Fortress, which achieved its present state in 1545 but represents a reworking of the earlier medieval fortress
- the town's walls and gates, the best preserved of which is the Porta Sovana.
- remains of a tall and very visible aqueduct at the very top of the butte.

=== Tempietto ===
The Tempietto ("small temple") is a small cave, probably of natural origin but considerably reworked by human hands, lying a few hundred meters outside the central district, yet far above the Lente valley. Its purpose and builders remain unknown. Locally it is referred to as a "paleochristian tempietto", but this has never been confirmed; it must date to Late Antiquity or the early Middle Ages, although it may replace an Etruscan or Roman arcosolium.

== People ==
- Umberto Baldini, art historian
- Giuseppe Bennati, director and screenwriter
- Alberto Manzi, teacher, writer and television presenter
- Niccolò di Pitigliano, noble leader
- Ugo Sorani, jurist and politician
- Francesco Zuccarelli, painter of the 18th century

== See also ==
- Orsini family
- Sorano
- Sovana
- Roman Catholic Diocese of Pitigliano-Sovana-Orbetello
