= Ugo Sorani =

Italian jurist and politician (1850–1906)

Member of the Chamber of Deputies
- In office 16 June 1900 – 3 April 1906
- Constituency: Scansano

Personal details
- Born: 4 May 1850 Pitigliano, Grand Duchy of Tuscany
- Died: 3 April 1906 (aged 55) Florence, Kingdom of Italy
- Occupation: Jurist

Ugo Sorani (4 May 1850 – 3 April 1906) was an Italian jurist and politician. Born in Pitigliano to an influential Jewish family, he graduated in law from Pisa in 1872. He worked as a lawyer in Florence and served as secretary of the Jewish community of Florence.

Sorani published numerous works on legal, political, and economic topics. In 1900, he was elected to the Chamber of Deputies for the Scansano constituency, and re-elected in 1904.

== Works ==
- I partiti politici, Florence, 1891.
- Maggioranze e minoranze, Florence, 1891.
- Sull'esercizio provvisorio del commercio concesso al fallito, Florence, 1891.
- Della ricerca della paternità. Considerazioni proposte all'esame del 3º Congresso giuridico nazionale, Florence, 1892.
- La Banca d'Italia. Provvedimenti legislativi, stato finanziario e proposte di assestamento, Florence, 1894.
- Stolfi - Rossi e Ghirlandai - Ficulle. Sviluppo di motivi di appello, Florence, E. Ariani, 1894.
- Della cambiale e dell'assegno bancario. Commento teorico-practico al Tit. X del Cod. di Comm. Italiano, Rome, Società ed. Dante Alighieri, 1896.
- Il fallimento, note e ricordi dell'esercizio di professione e legislazione comparata, Rome, Società ed. Dante Alighieri, 1896.
- La donna, Poggibonsi, 1896.
- Sul disegno di legge per il riordinamento dell'imposta di ricchezza mobile, Pitigliano, 1897.
