= Montorgiali =

- Frazione
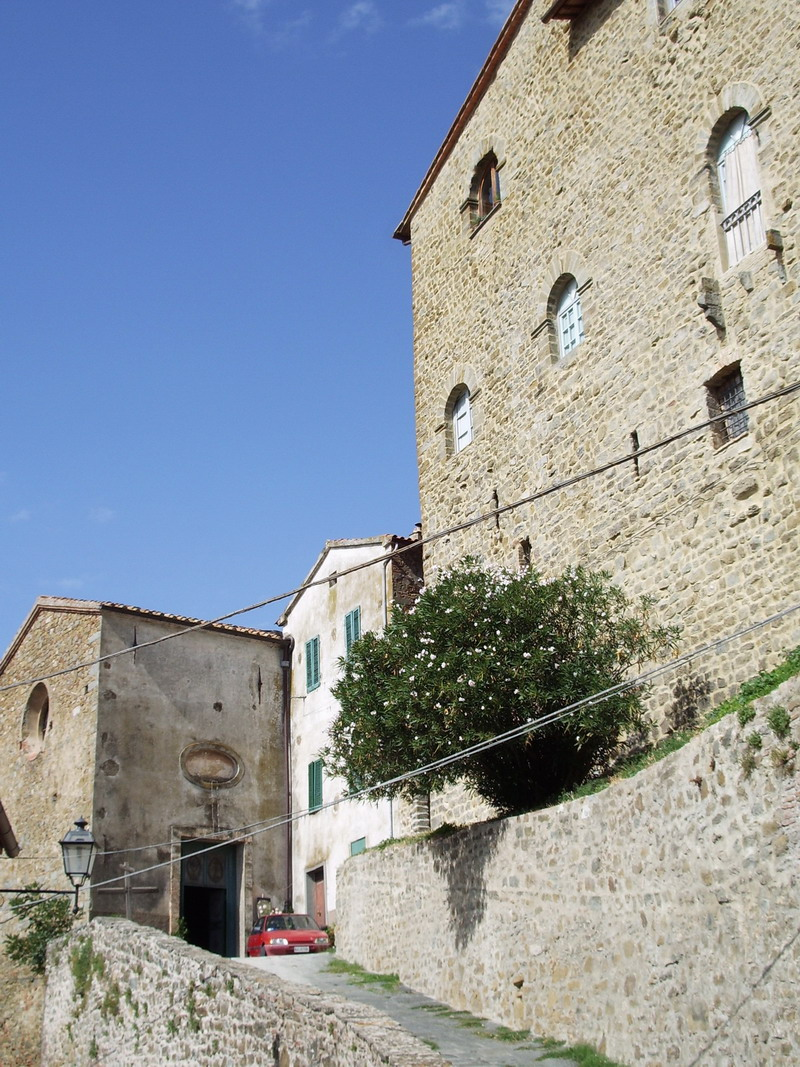
- View of the castle and the church

- Location of Montorgiali in Italy
- Coordinates: 42°44′18″N 11°17′57″E
- Country: Italy
- Region: Tuscany
- Province: Grosseto (GR)
- Comune: Scansano
- Elevation: 330 m (1,080 ft)

Population (2011)
  - Total: 162
- Demonym: Montorgialesi
- Time zone: UTC+1 (CET)
  - Summer (DST): UTC+2 (CEST)
- Postal code: 58054
- Dialing code: (+39) 0564

Montorgiali is a village in Tuscany, central Italy, administratively a frazione of the comune of Scansano, province of Grosseto. At the time of the 2001 census its population amounted to 141.

Montorgiali is about 21 km from Grosseto and 10 km from Scansano, and it is situated on a hill along the Scansanese Provincial Road.

== Main sights ==
- San Biagio (12th century), main parish church of the village
- Sanctuary of San Giorgio, old pieve during the Middle Ages, it is now a sanctuary dedicated to Saint George who, according to legend, defeated a dragon
- Castle of Montorgiali (12th century), main palace in the village

== Bibliography ==
- Aldo Mazzolai, Guida della Maremma. Percorsi tra arte e natura, Le Lettere, Florence, 1997.
- Giuseppe Guerrini, Torri e castelli della Provincia di Grosseto, Nuova Immagine Editrice, Siena, 1999.

== See also ==
- Baccinello
- Murci
- Pancole, Scansano
- Poggioferro
- Polveraia
- Pomonte, Scansano
- Preselle
