= Preselle =

- Frazione
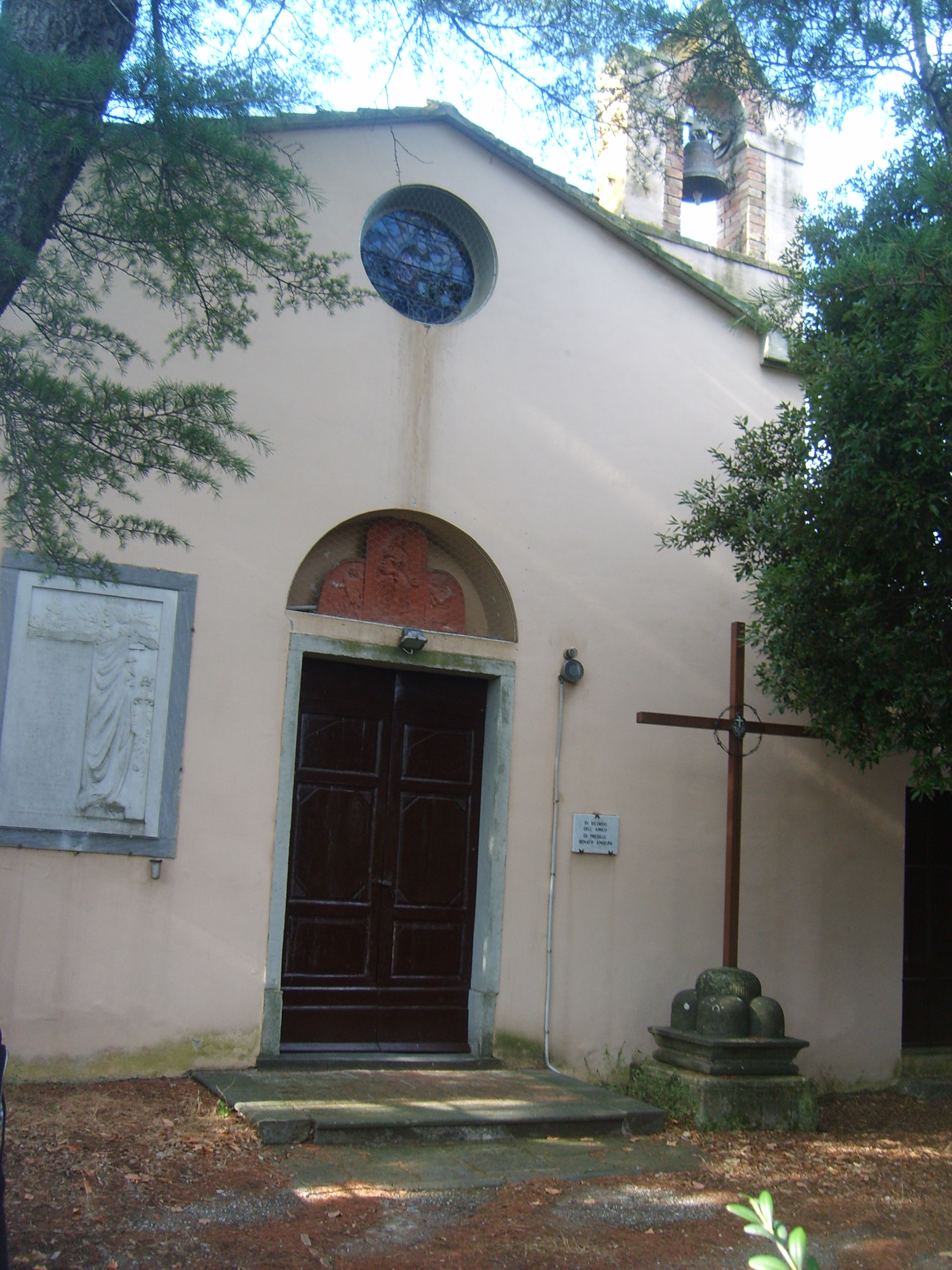
- The church of Sant'Isidoro

- Location of Preselle in Italy
- Coordinates: 42°45′38″N 11°15′27″E
- Country: Italy
- Region: Tuscany
- Province: Grosseto (GR)
- Comune: Scansano
- Elevation: 114 m (374 ft)

Population (2011)
  - Total: 130
- Demonym: Presellani
- Time zone: UTC+1 (CET)
  - Summer (DST): UTC+2 (CEST)
- Postal code: 58054
- Dialing code: (+39) 0564

Preselle is a village in Tuscany, central Italy, administratively a frazione of the comune of Scansano, province of Grosseto. At the time of the 2001 census its population amounted to 56.

Preselle is about 15 km from Grosseto and 14 km from Scansano, and it is situated in a plain between the hills renowned for the production of Morellino di Scansano.

== Main sights ==
- Sant'Isidoro, main parish church of the village, it was built in 1947.
- Chapel of Madonna della Pace, little church situated in Cerralti, it is part of the same parish of Preselle.
- Chapel of San Giuseppe Lavoratore, little church situated in Madrechiesa, it was built in 1956.
- Villa delle Preselle, big villa situated in the centre of the village.

== Bibliography ==
- Aldo Mazzolai, Guida della Maremma. Percorsi tra arte e natura, Le Lettere, Florence, 1997.
- Giuseppe Guerrini, Torri e castelli della Provincia di Grosseto, Nuova Immagine Editrice, Siena, 1999.

== See also ==
- Baccinello
- Montorgiali
- Murci
- Pancole, Scansano
- Poggioferro
- Polveraia
- Pomonte, Scansano
