= Poggio Buco =

- Location within Tuscany
- 42.5881°N 11.5837°E
- Type: Settlement
- Cultures: Etruscan
- Location: Pitigliano, Province of Grosseto, Italy
- Region: Tuscany

Site notes
- Excavation dates: 1980
- Public access: Partial

Poggio Buco is an Etruscan archaeological site in the municipality of Pitigliano, in the province of Grosseto, Tuscany, Italy. The name refers to both the settlement on the Pianoro delle Sparne plateau in the Fiora valley and the nearby necropolis. The site was once associated with the lost city of Statonia, but this identification has been rejected.

Excavations began in 1959 at the necropolis and in 1980 at the settlement. The site developed in several phases, from the late Bronze Age to the late Hellenistic period. Early burials show Proto-Villanovan cultural elements, while later phases include fortifications, buildings, and architectural decorations with zoomorphic and mythological reliefs. Poggio Buco may have functioned as a secondary aristocratic residence of Vulci, with possible ritual elements, although its exact role remains uncertain.
