= Pancole, Scansano =

Pancole
- Frazione
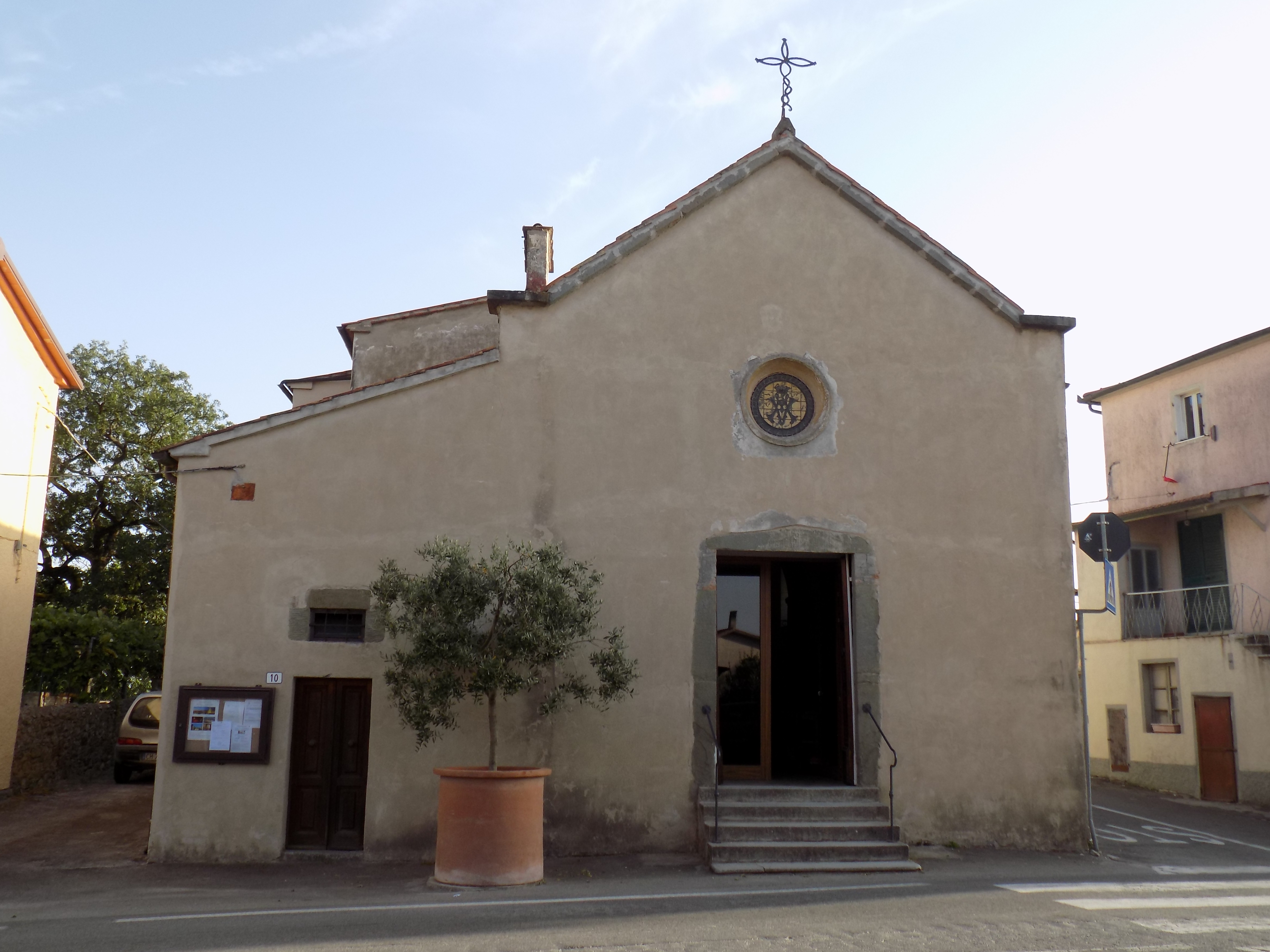
- The church of Santissimo Nome di Maria

- Location of Pancole in Italy
- Coordinates: 42°42′55″N 11°18′1″E
- Country: Italy
- Region: Tuscany
- Province: Grosseto (GR)
- Comune: Scansano
- Elevation: 462 m (1,516 ft)

Population (2011)
  - Total: 343
- Demonym: Pancolesi
- Time zone: UTC+1 (CET)
  - Summer (DST): UTC+2 (CEST)
- Postal code: 58054
- Dialing code: (+39) 0564

Pancole is a village in Tuscany, central Italy, administratively a frazione of the comune of Scansano, province of Grosseto. At the time of the 2001 census its population amounted to 308.

Pancole is about 22 km from Grosseto and 6 km from Scansano, and it is situated in a plain on a hill along the Scansanese Provincial Road.

== Main sights ==
- Santissimo Nome di Maria, main parish church of the village, it was built in 1688. The little chapel of Sacro Cuore di Gesù is annexed to the church.
- Chapel of Sant'Anna, it was built in 1827.

== Bibliography ==
- Aldo Mazzolai, Guida della Maremma. Percorsi tra arte e natura, Le Lettere, Florence, 1997.
- Giuseppe Guerrini, Torri e castelli della Provincia di Grosseto, Nuova Immagine Editrice, Siena, 1999.

== See also ==
- Baccinello
- Montorgiali
- Murci
- Poggioferro
- Polveraia
- Pomonte, Scansano
- Preselle
