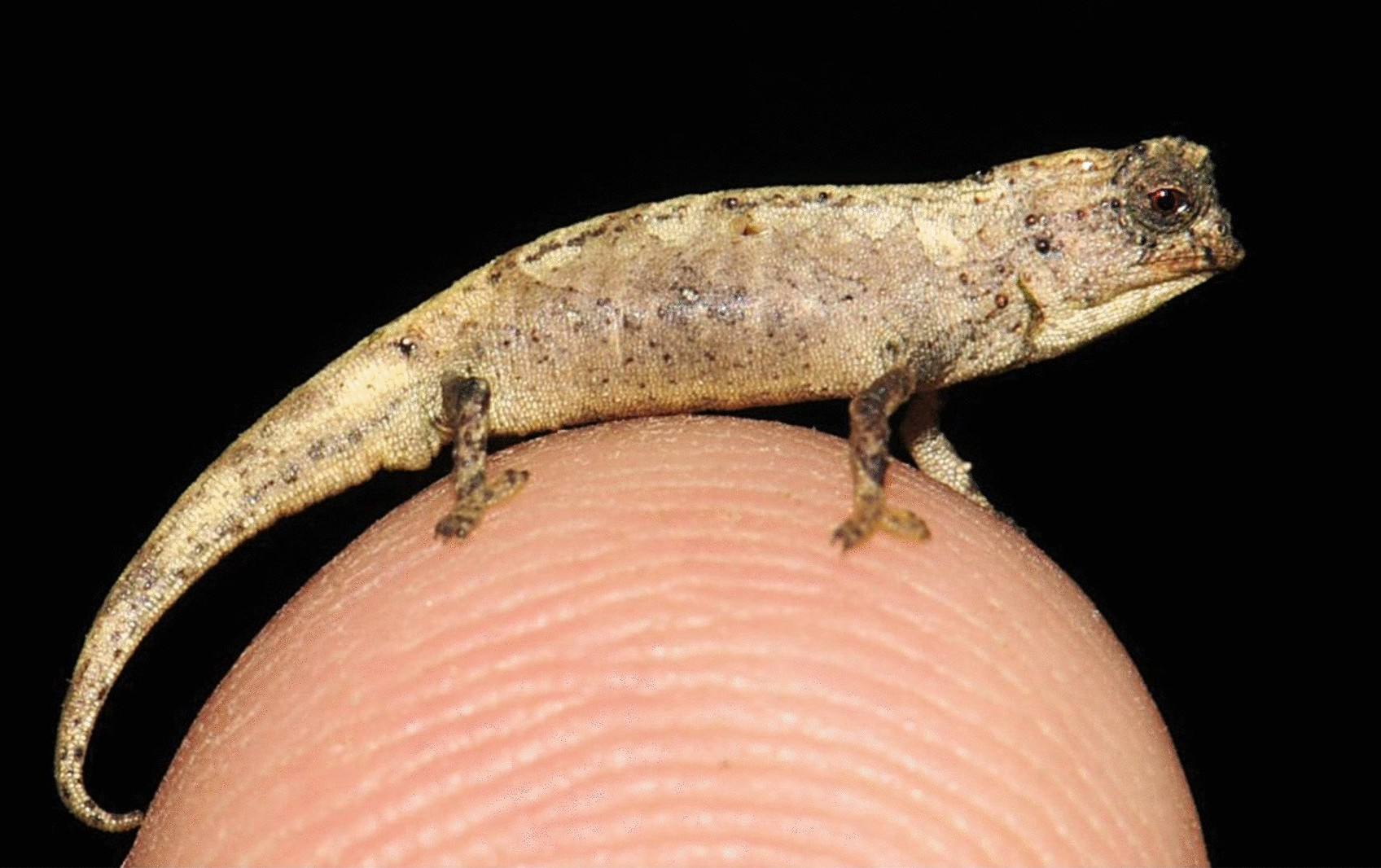

Scientific classification
- Kingdom: Animalia
- Phylum: Chordata
- Order: Squamata
- Suborder: Iguania
- Family: Chamaeleonidae
- Genus: Brookesia
- Species: B. nana

Binomial name
- Brookesia nana Glaw et al., 2021

= Brookesia nana =

Species of chameleon

Brookesia nana, also known as the nano-chameleon, is a species of chameleon endemic to montane rainforests in northern Madagascar (North of 16°S). Unlike some chameleons, Brookesia nana does not change colors, which is an example of paedomorphism. The majority of northern Brookesia species are restricted to rainforest.

The species was discovered by herpetologist Frank Glaw and other German researchers in 2021 in the rainforest on the Sorata massif in northern Madagascar. Described in 2021, it could represent the world's smallest reptile. Brookesia nana is not arboreal, as it tends to inhabit the forest floor. It is likely that the species is endangered due to deforestation in Madagascar. Miniaturism is believed to evolve from habitat loss.

== Description ==
The nano-chameleon is blotchy brown in color with a yellow-orange tail. Like other Brookesia species, females are generally larger than the males to accommodate their eggs. Adult males measure 22 mm (0.87 inch) in total length (including tail), while females are slightly larger at 29 mm (1.1 inches). This species of chameleon has rows of dorsolateral tubercles along its vertebral column and also has a pelvic spine. There is an absent dorsal pelvic shield in the sacral area. Male chameleons have shorter tails than females which differs from species of the Brookesia minima group. New species is most similar to Brookesia micra. Brookesia nana contain relatively large genital organs which are necessary for successful copulation.

== Evolution ==
The chameleon genus Brookesia is made up of species which were divided into two lineages. One of the lineages is made up of miniaturized species. Evolution of miniaturized body results in consequences to the survival of Brookesia.

== Conservation status ==
Brookesia nana is known from a single location. Much about this species remains unknown which makes it difficult to evaluate conservation status. This species is at higher risk due to low elevation and deforestation, slash-and-burn agriculture, and cattle. Madagascar officials have established a reserve in Sorata mountain, in Madagascar, to protect remaining forest habitats and B. nana.
