= Pomonte, Scansano =

Pomonte
- Frazione
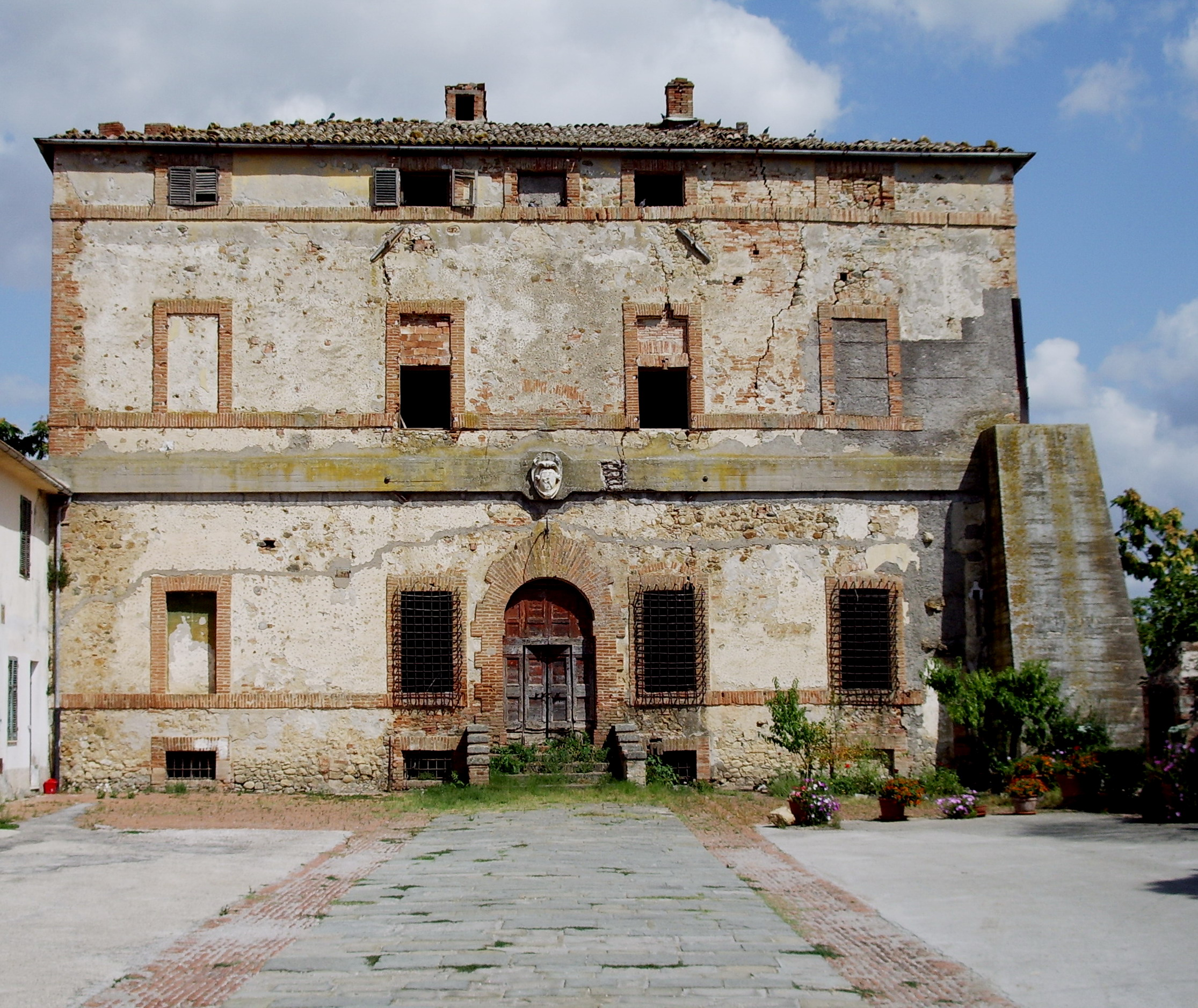
- The Villa Sforzesca

- Location of Pomonte in Italy
- Coordinates: 42°38′3″N 11°24′35″E
- Country: Italy
- Region: Tuscany
- Province: Grosseto (GR)
- Comune: Scansano
- Elevation: 140 m (460 ft)

Population (2011)
  - Total: 59
- Time zone: UTC+1 (CET)
  - Summer (DST): UTC+2 (CEST)
- Postal code: 58054
- Dialing code: (+39) 0564

Pomonte is a village in Tuscany, central Italy, administratively a frazione of the comune of Scansano, province of Grosseto. At the time of the 2001 census its population amounted to 26.

Pomonte is about 40 km from Grosseto and 14 km from Scansano, and it is situated on the hills along the Amiatina Provincial Road.

== Geography ==
Pomonte is a hamlet in the hilly inland of the Maremma, at the southern end of the municipality of Scansano. It lies on a plain along the right bank of the Albegna River, at an elevation of about 140 m, below the hill of Pomontaccio, which rises to 181 m.

The hamlet is bordered to the east by the Fosso Mazzapiedi and to the west by the Fosso Sanguinaio, both about 8 km long. These streams originate in the hills of Poggioferro and flow into the Albegna slightly south of the village.

== History ==
A first settlement in the area of Pomonte dates to 1577, when Mario Sforza completed the construction of the Villa Sforzesca within his hunting estate. In the 17th century, following the annexation of the County of Santa Fiora to the Grand Duchy of Tuscany, the villa passed to the grand dukes and was converted into an agricultural estate.

In 1787, the Leopoldine reforms led to Pomonte's incorporation into the municipality of Scansano.

During the second half of the 20th century, the hamlet developed with the construction of a service center for the surrounding countryside as part of the Maremma land reform initiated in 1951. The modern village, designed by architect Carlo Boccianti, was built between the late 1950s and the 1960s.

== Main sights ==
=== Church of Saint Benedict ===
The church of Saint Benedict (San Benedetto) is the parish church of the village. It was built in 1967 at the initiative of the Ente Maremma and was elevated to parish status in 1969. The church was designed by architect Carlo Boccianti, with a mosaic on the façade by Pietro Cascella. The interior contains a 17th-century painting of the "Madonna and Child in Glory with Saint Anthony Abbot and Saint Benedict", originally from the chapel at the Villa Sforzesca.

=== Villa Sforzesca ===
The Villa Sforzesca, also known as the Pomonte Farm, is a historic villa built by the Sforza family between 1575 and 1577, at the same time as their villa at Castell'Azzara. Following the annexation of the area to the Grand Duchy of Tuscany, it was converted into an agricultural estate by the House of Habsburg-Lorraine. The building is currently in a state of abandonment and decay. The villa includes the chapel of Saint Anthony Abbot. Its 17th-century altarpiece, attributed to the Sienese school, is now preserved in the parish church.

== Education ==
Public educational services in Pomonte are provided by the "Federigo Tozzi" Institute of Paganico. The village hosts a primary school.

== See also ==
- Baccinello
- Montorgiali
- Murci
- Pancole, Scansano
- Poggioferro
- Polveraia
- Preselle
