= Orlando Paladino Orlandini =

Italian sculptor

- Born: 2 January 1905; Scansano, Province of Grosseto, Kingdom of Italy
- Died: 6 March 1986 (aged 81); Montespertoli, Province of Florence, Tuscany, Italy
- Occupation: Sculptor

Orlando Paladino Orlandini (2 January 1905 – 6 March 1986) was an Italian sculptor, born in Scansano (Grosseto). He trained in Carrara to gain experience of working with marble before going on to study in Rome at the Accademia di Belle Arti, the School of Medals (Scuola della Medaglia) and the Calcografia Nazionale. He later taught at the Scuole del Museo Artistico Industriale.

In his sculptures he specialised in sporting subjects. His work Pattinatrice was part of the sculpture event in the art competition at the 1936 Summer Olympics. He is chiefly notable however for his work as a medal engraver.
