= Murci =

Village in Tuscany, Italy

- Frazione
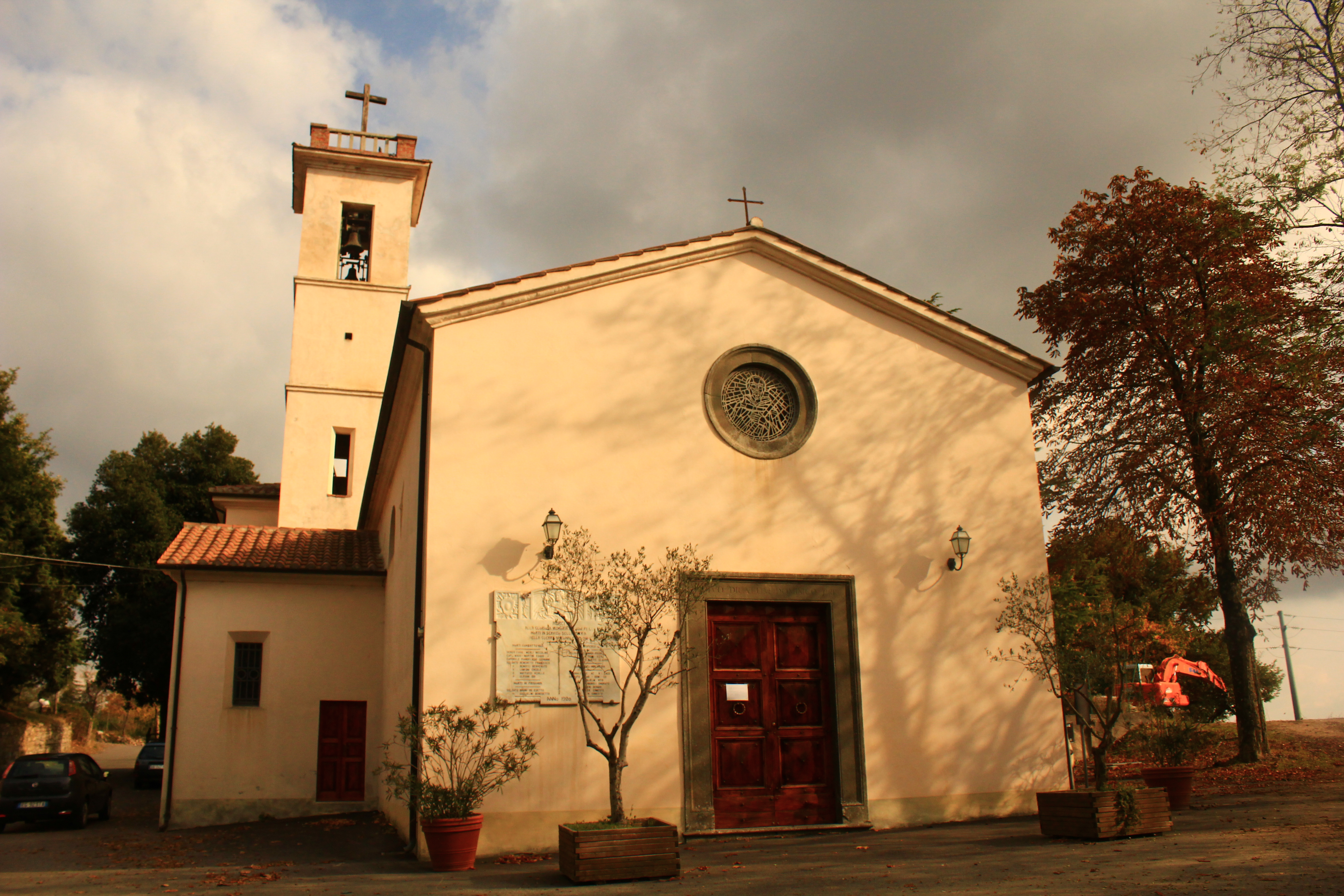
- The church of San Domenico

- Location of Murci in Italy
- Coordinates: 42°44′3″N 11°24′43″E
- Country: Italy
- Region: Tuscany
- Province: Grosseto (GR)
- Comune: Scansano
- Elevation: 595 m (1,952 ft)

Population (2011)
  - Total: 149
- Demonym: Murciaioli
- Time zone: UTC+1 (CET)
  - Summer (DST): UTC+2 (CEST)
- Postal code: 58054
- Dialing code: (+39) 0564

Murci is a village in Tuscany, central Italy, administratively a frazione of the comune of Scansano, province of Grosseto. At the time of the 2001 census its population amounted to 173.

Murci is about 40 km from Grosseto and 14 km from Scansano, and it is situated on the hills along the Amiatina Provincial Road.

== Main sights ==
- San Domenico (19th century), main parish church of the village.
- Poggi Alti wind farm, it was built in 2006.

== See also ==
- Baccinello
- Montorgiali
- Pancole, Scansano
- Poggioferro
- Polveraia
- Pomonte, Scansano
- Preselle

== Bibliography ==
- Aldo Mazzolai, Guida della Maremma. Percorsi tra arte e natura, Le Lettere, Florence, 1997.
- Giuseppe Guerrini, Torri e castelli della Provincia di Grosseto, Nuova Immagine Editrice, Siena, 1999.
