= Scansano =

- Comune
- Comune di Scansano
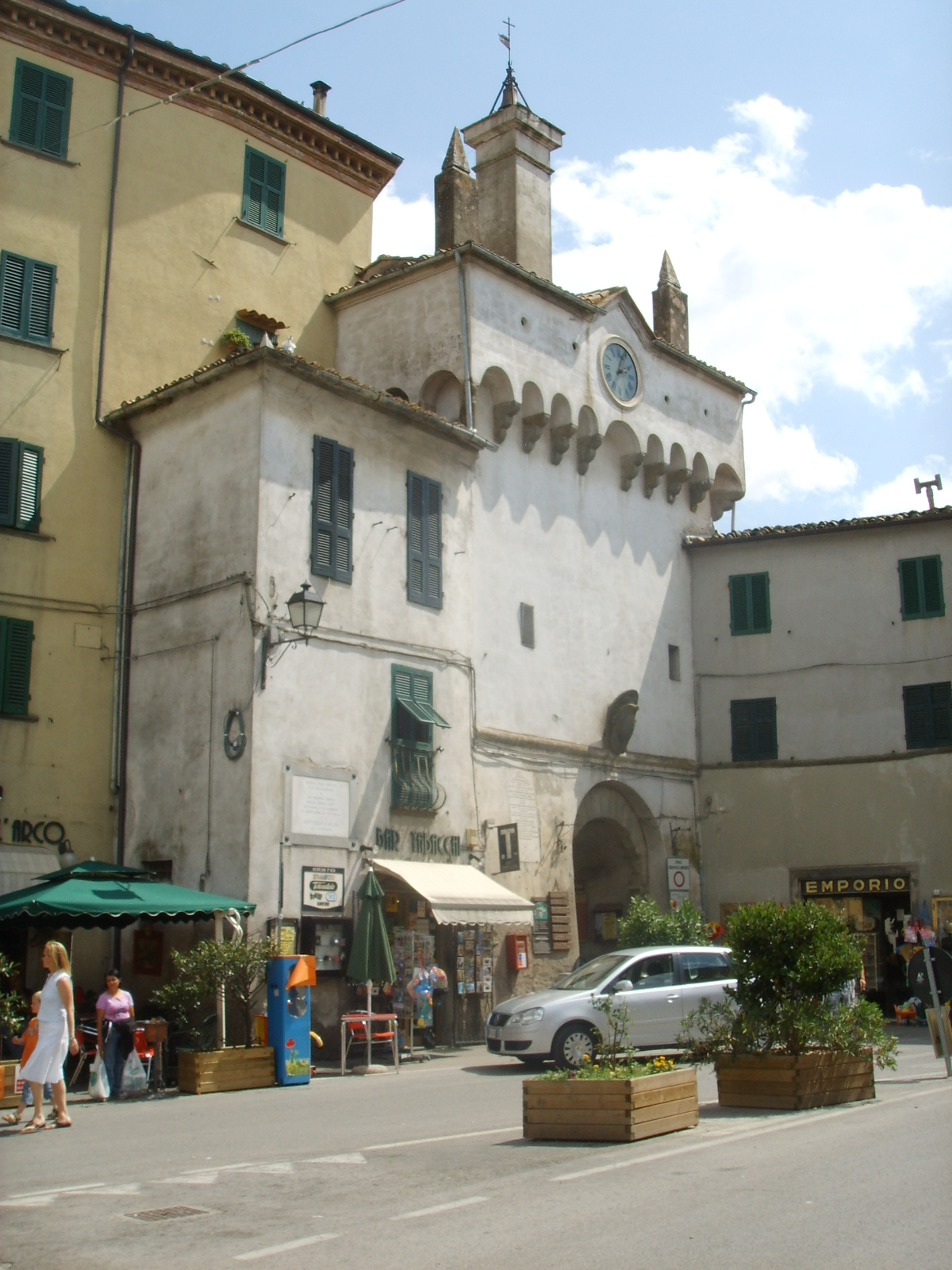
- The main gate of Scansano

- Coat of arms

- Location within Italy Location within Tuscany
- Coordinates: 42°41′23″N 11°20′5″E
- Country: Italy
- Region: Tuscany
- Province: Grosseto (GR)
- Frazioni: Baccinello, Montorgiali, Murci, Pancole, Poggioferro, Polveraia, Pomonte, Preselle

Government
  - Mayor: Maria Bice Ginesi (centre-left)

Area
  - Total: 273.53 km^{2} (105.61 sq mi)
- Elevation: 500 m (1,600 ft)

Population (1 January 2022)
  - Total: 4,241
  - Density: 15.50/km^{2} (40.16/sq mi)
- Demonym: Scansanesi
- Time zone: UTC+1 (CET)
  - Summer (DST): UTC+2 (CEST)
- Postal code: 58054
- Dialing code: 0564
- Patron saint: St. John the Baptist
- Saint day: 29 August
- Website: Official website

Scansano is a town and comune, of medieval origin, in the province of Grosseto, Tuscany, central Italy. The area which Scansano lies within is called Maremma.

Scansano area is home to the production of Morellino di Scansano, a type of wine.

== Frazioni ==
The municipality is formed by the municipal seat of Scansano and the villages (frazioni) of Baccinello, Montorgiali, Murci, Pancole, Poggioferro, Polveraia, Pomonte and Preselle.

== People ==
- Orlando Paladino Orlandini, sculptor
- Domenico Tonarelli, politician and prefect
- Angelo Valle, politician
- Corrado Valle, hurdler
