= Nosy Hara National Park =

National park in Madagascar

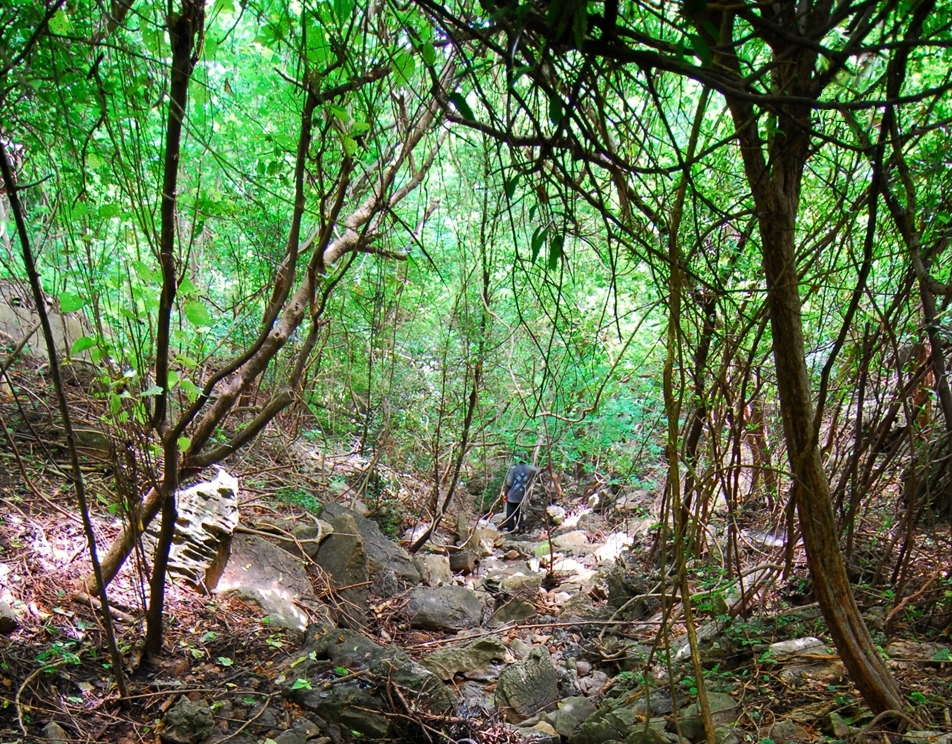

- Location within Madagascar

Geography
- Location: Madagascar
- Coordinates: 12.241°S 49.013°E
- Area: 2.7 km^{2} (1.0 sq mi)
- Highest elevation: 104 m (341 ft)

Administration
- Madagascar

Demographics
- Population: 0

Nosy Hara or Nosy Hara National Park is an uninhabited limestone islet in the Diana Region off the northwest coast of Madagascar. It is the habitat of Brookesia micra, the smallest known chameleon. Since 2007, Nosy Hara has been part of a Marine Protected Area.
