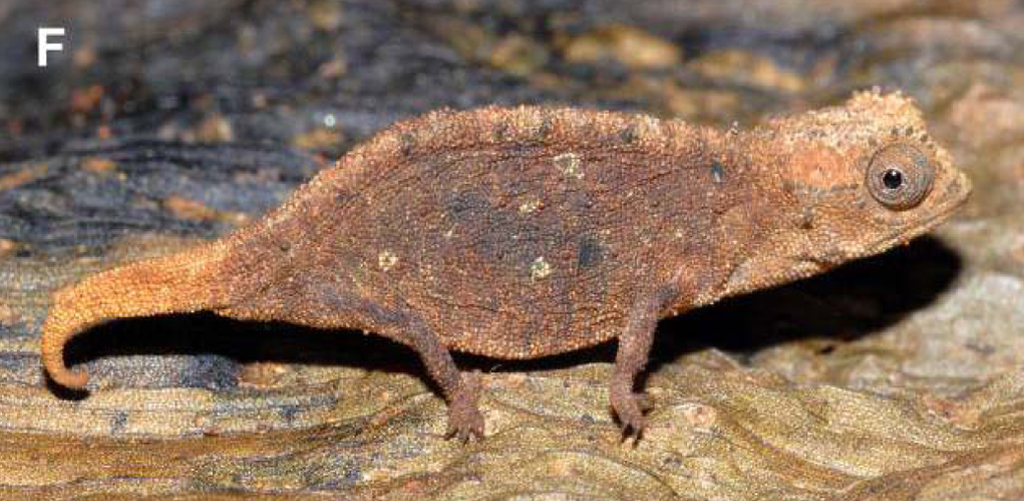

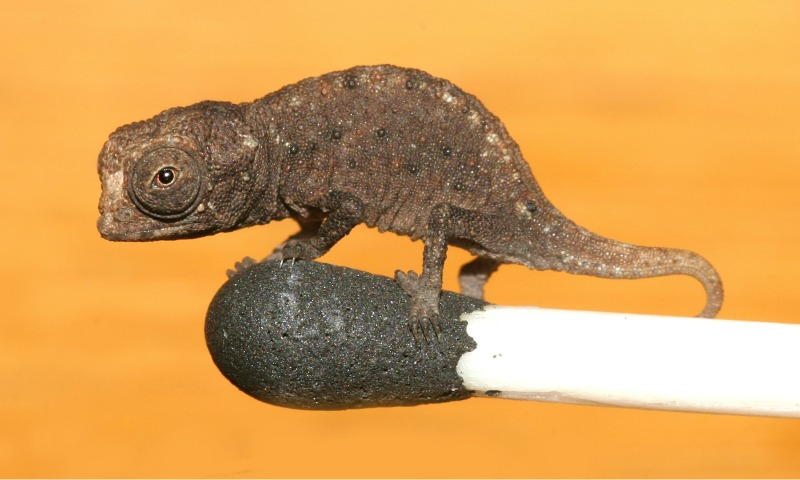
- Adult female in natural habitat (top), juvenile on match head (bottom)

Conservation status
- Near Threatened (IUCN 3.1)

Scientific classification
- Kingdom: Animalia
- Phylum: Chordata
- Class: Reptilia
- Order: Squamata
- Suborder: Iguania
- Family: Chamaeleonidae
- Genus: Brookesia
- Species: B. micra

Binomial name
- Brookesia micra Glaw, Köhler, Townsend, & Vences, 2012
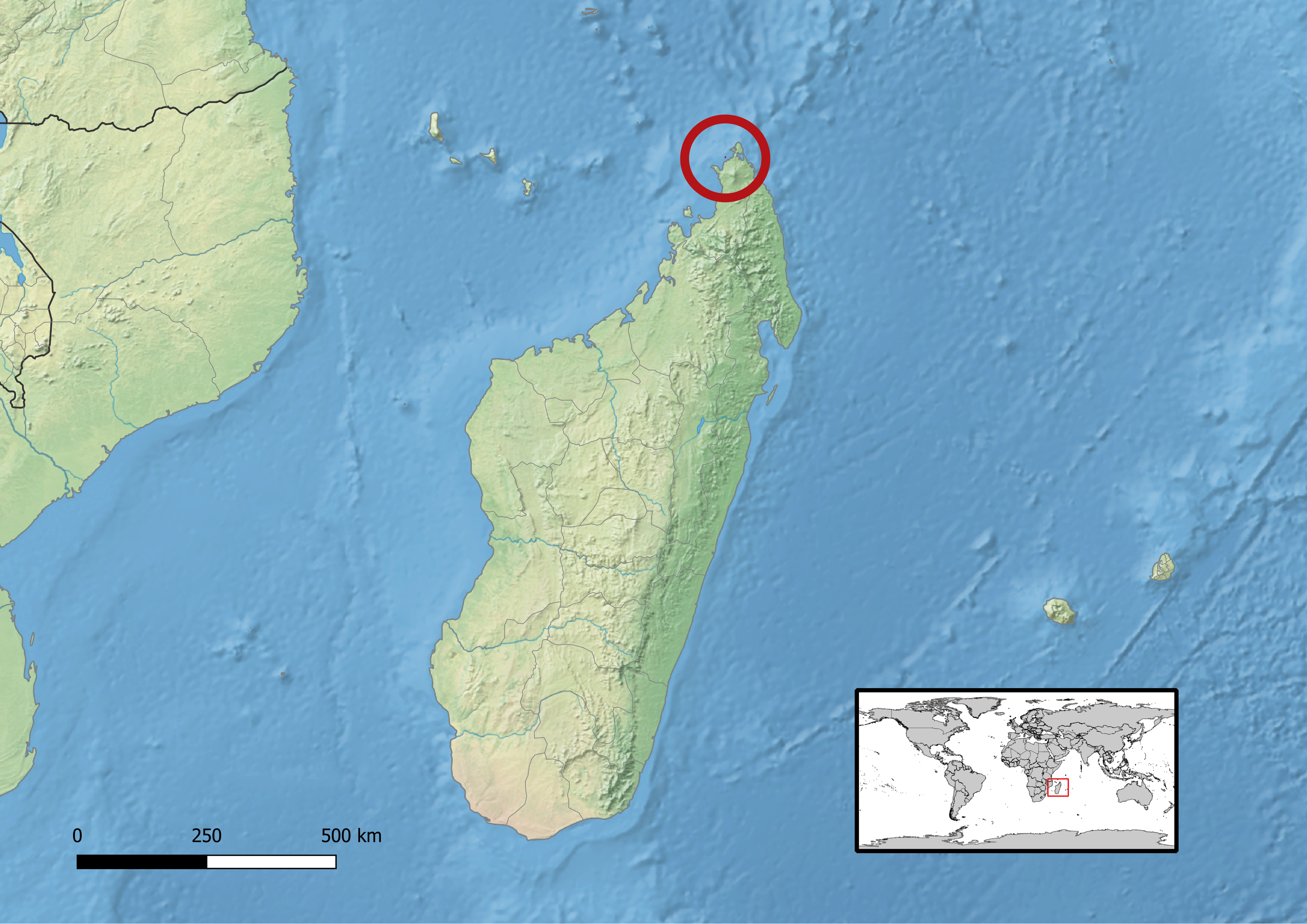

= Brookesia micra =

Species of lizard

Brookesia micra, also known as the Nosy Hara leaf chameleon, is a species of small chameleon from the islet of Nosy Hara in Antsiranana, Madagascar. At the time of its discovery, it was the smallest known chameleon and among the smallest reptiles, until the 2021 discovery of the even smaller B. nana. Adult B. micra can grow up to 29 mm (1.1 in) in length.

== Taxonomy ==
Brookesia micra was discovered and named by a team of researchers led by Frank Glaw of the Bavarian State Collection of Zoology. Glaw and his colleagues have been conducting expeditions into the Malagasy forests for eight years. Members of the species had previously been labelled as Brookesia sp. "Nosy Hara" in 2007 by Glaw and Vences.

=== Etymology ===
The specific epithet of B. micra is a derivation of the Latin form of the Greek word "μικρός" (mikros), which means either "tiny" or "small" and refers to the small body size.

== Description ==
The males of Brookesia micra reach a maximum snout-vent length of 16 mm (0.63 in), and the total body length of both of the sexes is less than 30 mm (1.2 in), ranking it among the smallest amniote vertebrates found anywhere in the world. Compared to Brookesia minima, B. micra has a shorter tail and a larger head. Adults of B. micra also have orange tails, as opposed to an inconspicuous brown one. The size of the lizard may be linked to its habitat, due to insular dwarfism.

== Distribution and habitat ==
Brookesia micra, together with three other species, were found in north Madagascar in 2005. This species was discovered on a small, uninhabited island in the Nosy Hara archipelago off the coast of Madagascar. They typically reside in leaf litter during the day, and climb up into tree branches as high as 10 cm (3.9 in) at night to sleep. B. micra habitats are most prevalent in areas with tsingy (i.e., limestone karst), potentially because of the moisture it provides, the protection from predators, and/or that it is the most abundant ecological feature of the area. High altitudes (500-700 meters) and sloped ground (due to higher levels of water shedding) were additional features that were common in B. micra habitats, while leaf litter was not found to be a very important characteristic of their habitats. B. micra lives in an area subject to illegal logging, which may make the species "sensitive to habitat destruction", according to researcher Jorn Köhler. Due to the highly specific nature of B. micra's habitat, the species would be at high risk for extinction if habitat destruction were to occur.
