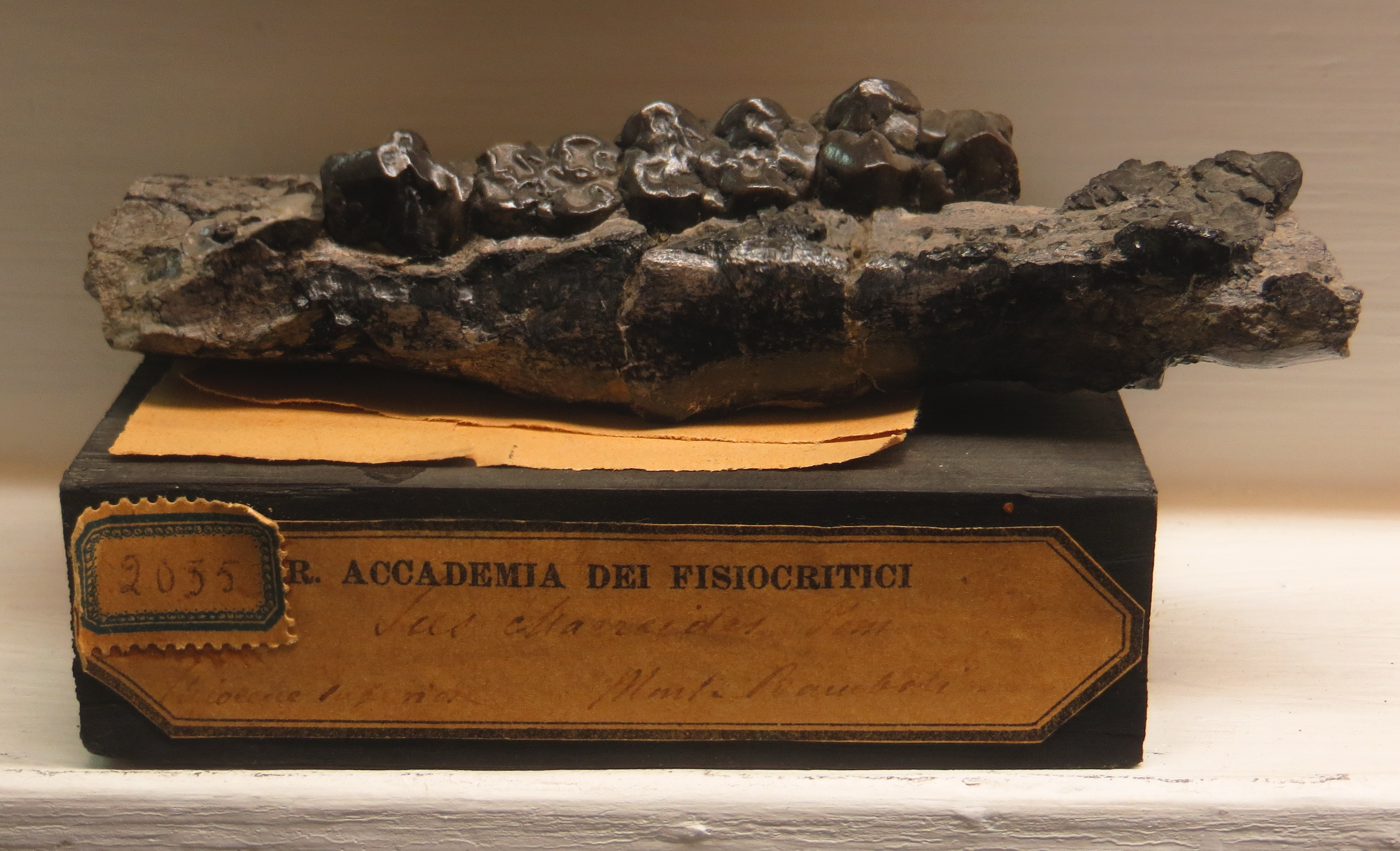
- Mandible of Eumaiochoerus etruscus

Scientific classification
- Domain: Eukaryota
- Kingdom: Animalia
- Phylum: Chordata
- Class: Mammalia
- Order: Artiodactyla
- Family: Suidae
- Genus: †Eumaiochoerus; Hurzeler, 1982
- Species: †E. etruscus

Binomial name
- †Eumaiochoerus etruscus Hurzeler, 1982

= Eumaiochoerus =

Eumaiochoerus Temporal range: 11.608–7.246 Ma

Extinct genus of mammals

Eumaiochoerus is an extinct genus of even-toed ungulates that existed during the Miocene in Italy.

== Description ==
Eumaiochoerus had a short snout, spatulate upper incisors and small, chisel-shaped lower tusks.

Fossils of Eumaiochoerus were found in Baccinello and Montebamboli in Italy, which at the time of its existence would have been an island chain. Eumaiochoerus does show characteristics of an insular mammal, being much smaller than its mainland relative Microstonyx.

== See also ==
Oreopithecus
