= Baccinello =

- Frazione
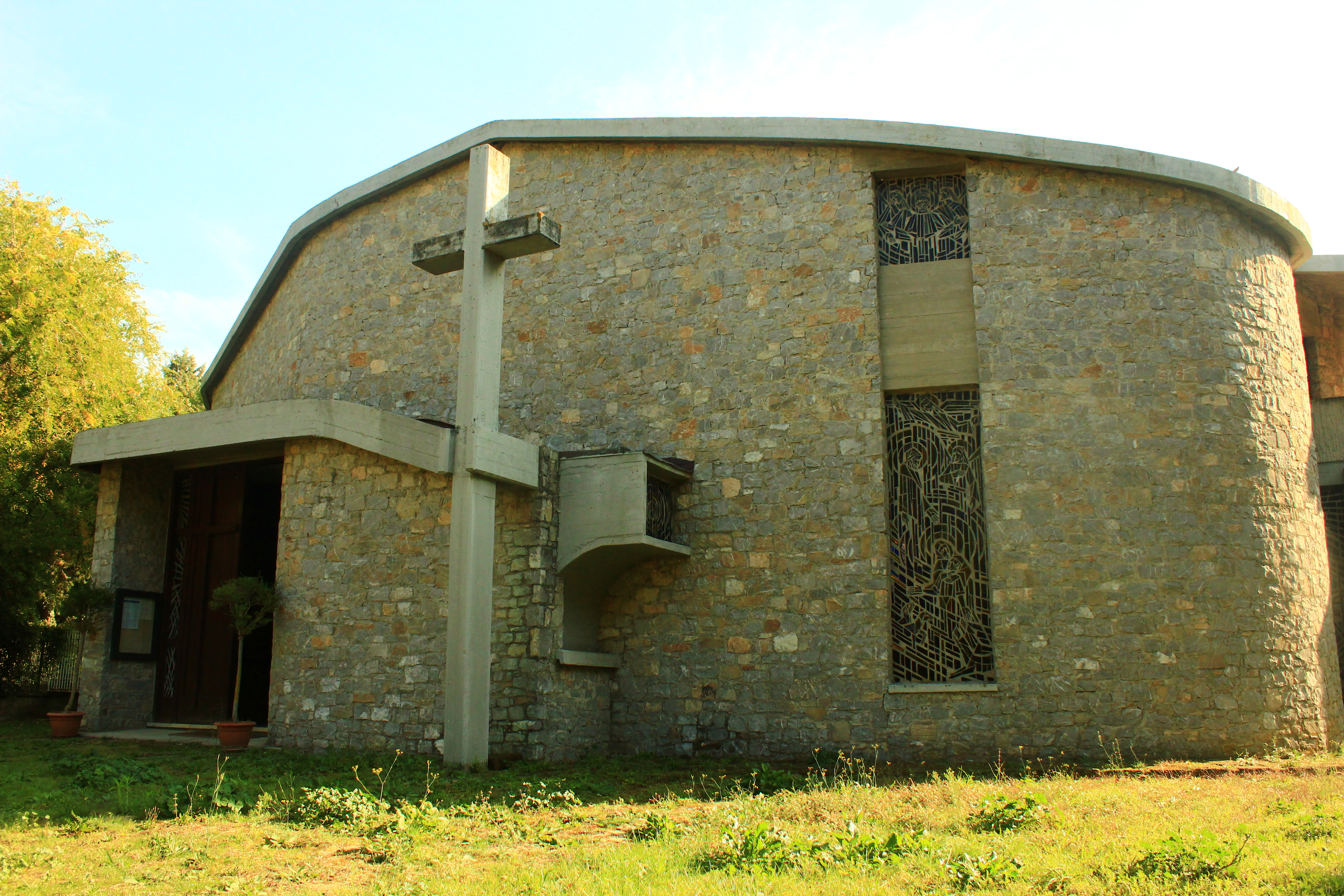
- The church of San Giovanni Bosco

- Location of Baccinello in Italy
- Coordinates: 42°47′26″N 11°21′55″E
- Country: Italy
- Region: Tuscany
- Province: Grosseto (GR)
- Comune: Scansano
- Elevation: 156 m (512 ft)

Population (2011)
  - Total: 271
- Demonym: Baccinellini
- Time zone: UTC+1 (CET)
  - Summer (DST): UTC+2 (CEST)
- Postal code: 58054
- Dialing code: (+39) 0564

Baccinello is a village in Tuscany, central Italy, administratively a frazione of the comune of Scansano, province of Grosseto. At the time of the 2001 census its population amounted to 284.

Baccinello is about 24 km from Grosseto and 21 km from Scansano, and it is situated in a plain in the Trasubbie valley. The village became famous because, in 1958, a complete fossilized skeleton of Oreopithecus bambolii was found in one of the lignite mines.

== Main sights ==
- San Giovanni Bosco, main parish church of the village, it was built in 1977
- Old lignite mine, one of the most important sites of lignite in Europe, it's now closed

== Bibliography ==
- Aldo Mazzolai, Guida della Maremma. Percorsi tra arte e natura, Le Lettere, Florence, 1997.
- Giuseppe Guerrini, Torri e castelli della Provincia di Grosseto, Nuova Immagine Editrice, Siena, 1999.

== See also ==
- Montorgiali
- Murci
- Pancole, Scansano
- Poggioferro
- Polveraia
- Pomonte, Scansano
- Preselle
