= Evolutionary anachronism =

Attributes of living species that arose due to coevolution with other now-extinct species

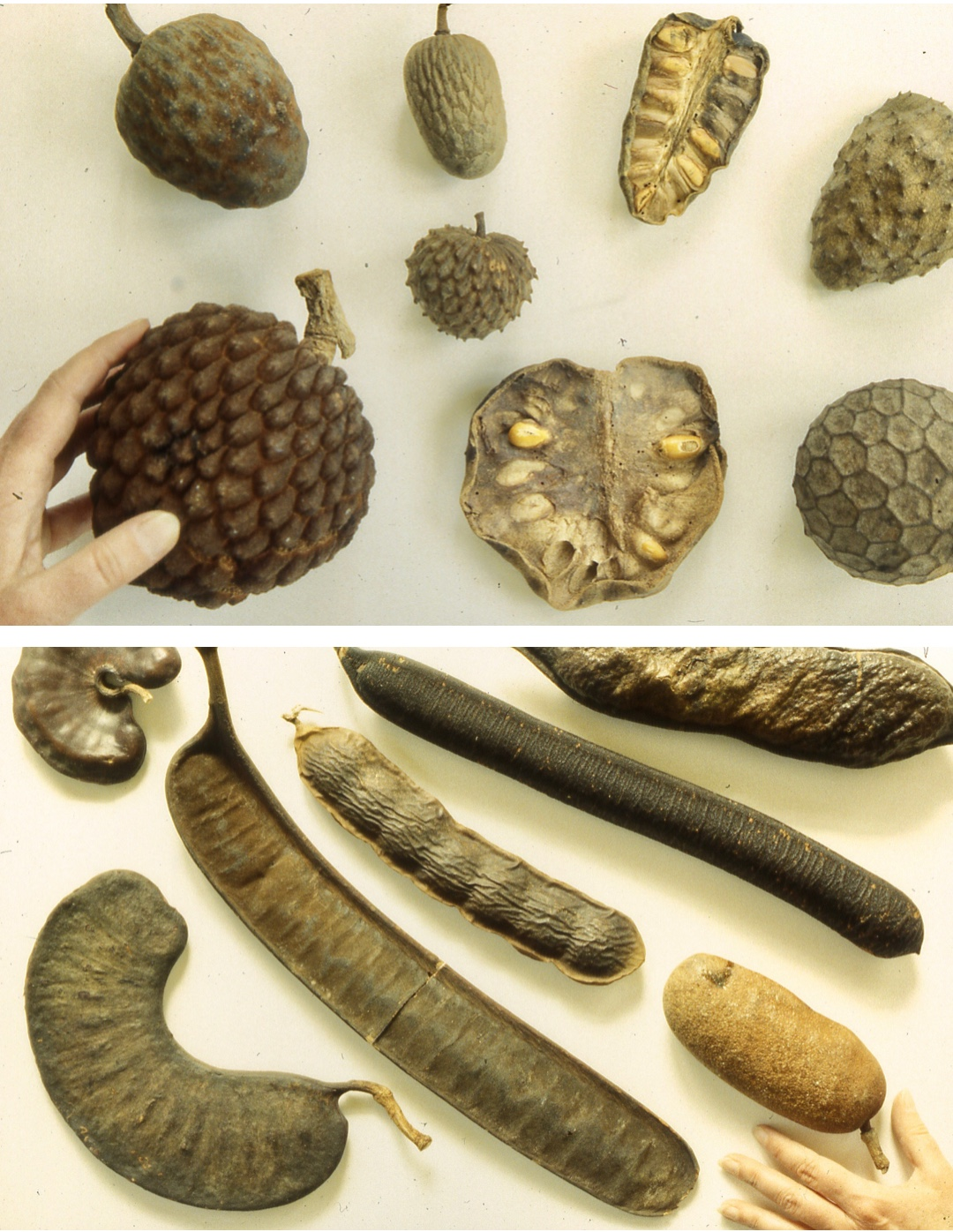
Dried examples of "neotropical anachronisms" from Brazil, Peru, and Nicaragua in the herbarium of the New York Botanical Garden.

Evolutionary anachronism, also known as "ecological anachronism", is a term initially referring to attributes of certain plant species that possess traits seemed best explained as having been favorably selected in the past due to their coevolution with plant-eating megafauna that are now extinct. By far the most famous of these is the avocado, which is native to the Tropical Americas, but contains pits too large for even the largest currently living native frugivore, certain tapirs, but is readily consumed by Pleistocene megafaunal analogs (elephants, rhinos) if introduced to Africa and India.

The concept was formulated by Costa Rican-based American ecologist Daniel H. Janzen and carried broadly into scientific awareness when he and his coauthor, paleoecologist Paul S. Martin, published "Neotropical Anachronisms: The Fruits the Gomphotheres Ate" in the journal Science. Among the largest of extinct fruit-eating mammals in the American tropics were the gomphotheres, related to modern elephants, which inspired the title chosen by Janzen and Martin for their 1982 paper. As they explained,

There are prominent members of the lowland forest flora of Costa Rica whose fruit and seed traits can best be explained by viewing them as anachronisms. These traits were molded by evolutionary interactions with the Pleistocene megafauna (and earlier animals) but have not yet effectively responded to its absence.

Claims of gomphothere fruit consumption were validated in 2025 when teeth of the South American gomphothere Notiomastodon were found with the residue of Chilean cocopalm (Jubaea chilensis) fruit.

The Janzen and Martin paper was preceded by a 1977 publication by American ecologist Stanley Temple. Temple attributed the decline of the Mauritius endemic tree tambalacoque to human overharvesting to extinction of a large, flightless bird that had coevolved on the same tropical island: the dodo. It was Janzen who applied the concept to some 18 fruiting plant species or genera in Costa Rica, while Martin took the lead on proposing a distinct seed dispersal syndrome: the "megafaunal dispersal syndrome" by comparing the maladapted neotropical fruits with similar forms in the tropics of Africa and Asia that were documented as dispersed by elephants still inhabiting those continents.

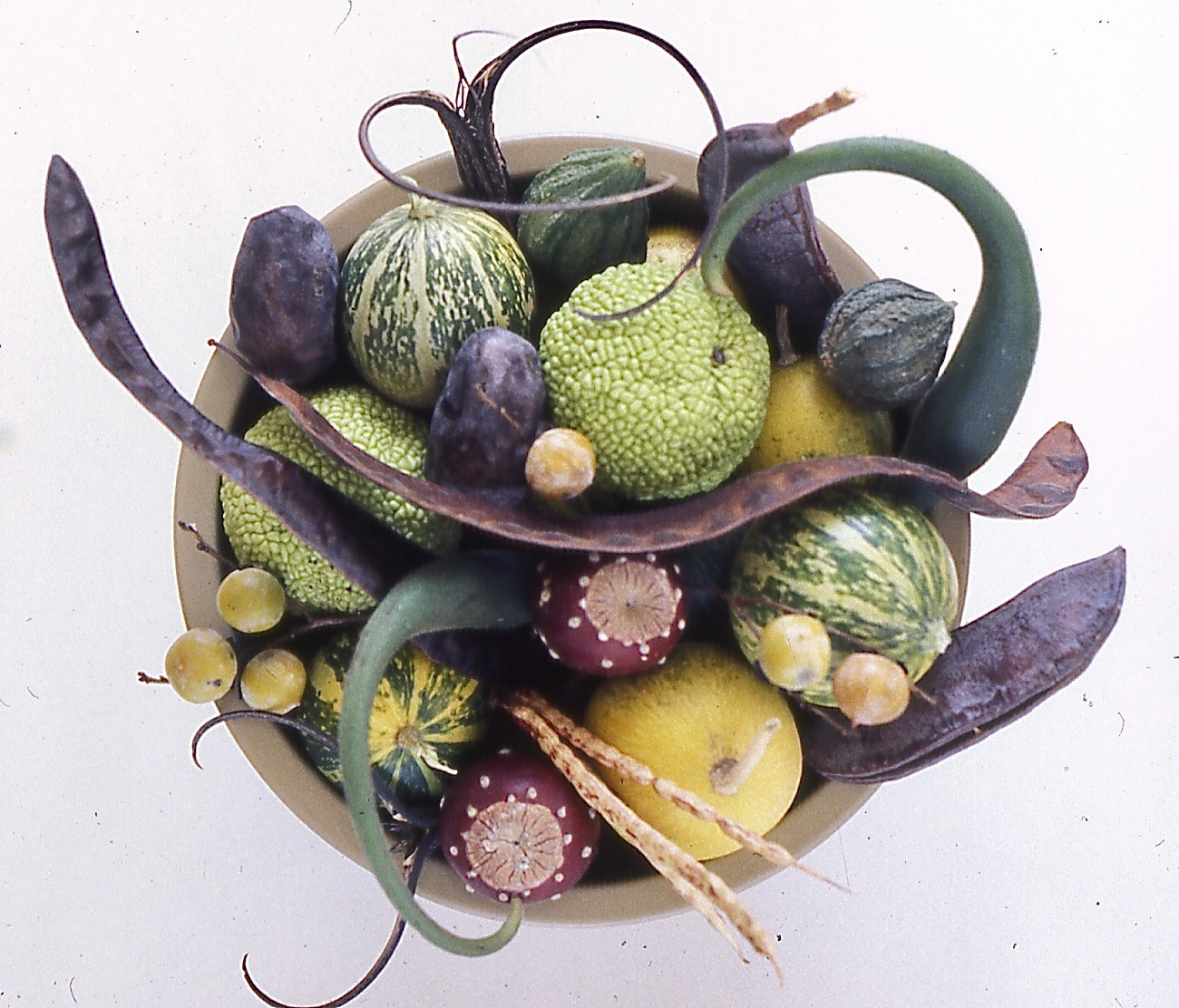
Anachronistic fruits of temperate North America, collected by Connie Barlow. Includes pods of devil's claw (top), honey locust (long and curvy at middle) and mesquite (beige at bottom), along with other fruits of the forests and deserts of the USA.

Two decades after the "neotropical anachronisms" concept was published and named, science writer Connie Barlow aggregated its history and subsequent applications into a popular science book: The Ghosts of Evolution: Nonsensical Fruit, Missing Partners, and Other Ecological Anachronisms. In shaping the book's title, Barlow drew upon a 1992 essay by Paul S. Martin titled "The Last Entire Earth". Martin had written:

In the shadows along the trail I keep an eye out for the ghosts, the beasts of the ice age. What is the purpose of the thorns on the mesquites in my backyard in Tucson? Why do they and honey locusts have sugary pods so attractive to livestock? Whose foot is devil's claw intended to intercept? Such musings add magic to a walk and may help to liberate us from tunnel vision, the hubris of the present, the misleading notion that nature is self-evident.

The honey locust mentioned in Martin's excerpt is a native tree of eastern North America. Because it is favored for planting along urban streets and parking lots, Barlow was very familiar with it while she was working on her book in New York City. Its long, curving pods became a prominent part of her book. Later, other writers also popularized its lost partnership with ice age "ghosts" (extinct fauna).

One animal-with-animal form of evolutionary anachronism also gained popular attention. As reported in the New York Times, "Pronghorn's Speed May Be Legacy of Past Predators", John A. Byers hypothesized that the antelope-like pronghorn of America's grasslands was still running from a Pleistocene ghost that had been much faster than America's native wolves. This ghost was the American cheetah.

== Megafaunal dispersal syndrome ==
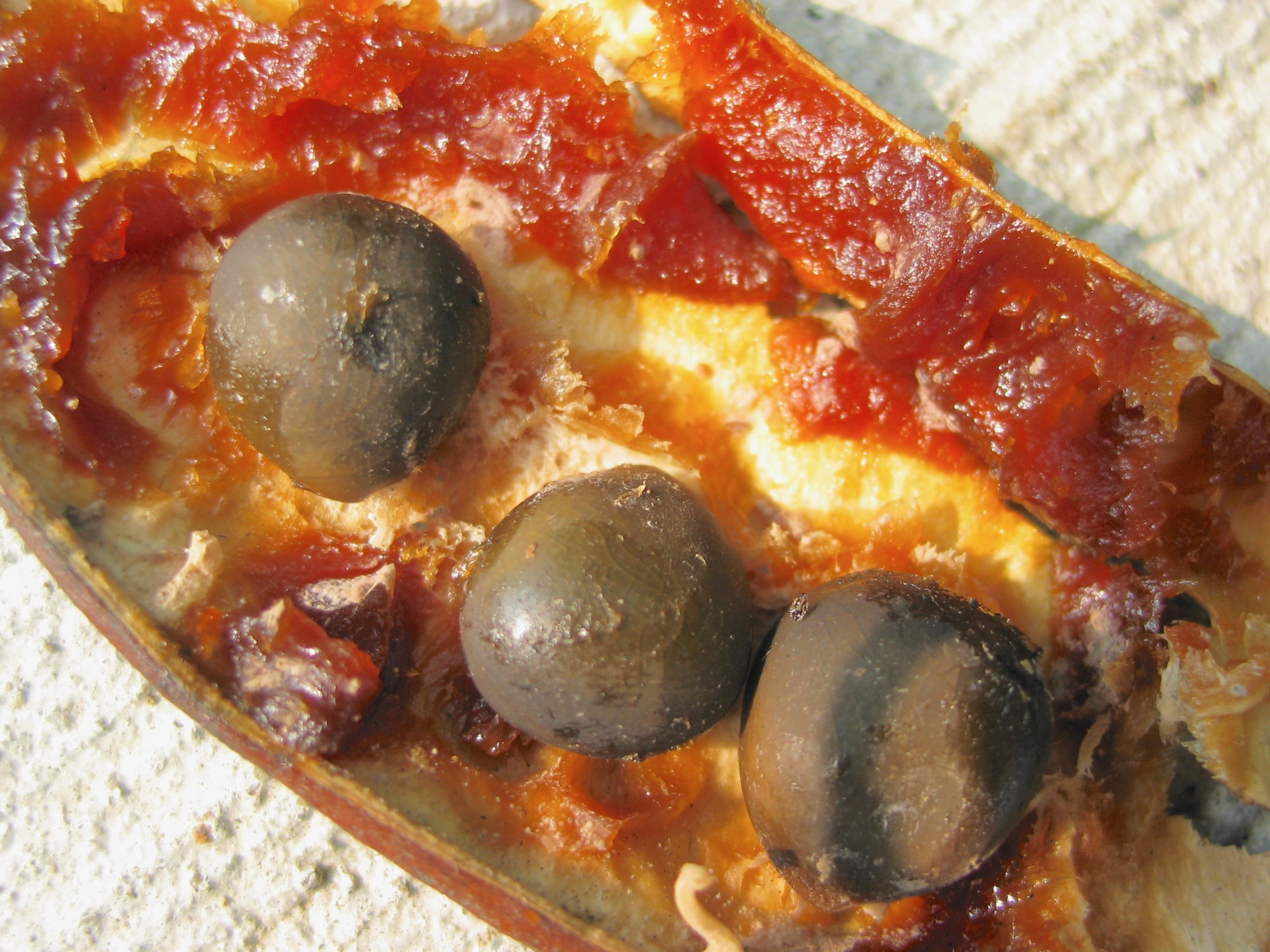
Pulp surrounds the large seeds of Gymnocladus dioica (Kentucky coffeetree) within its large, stiff pod

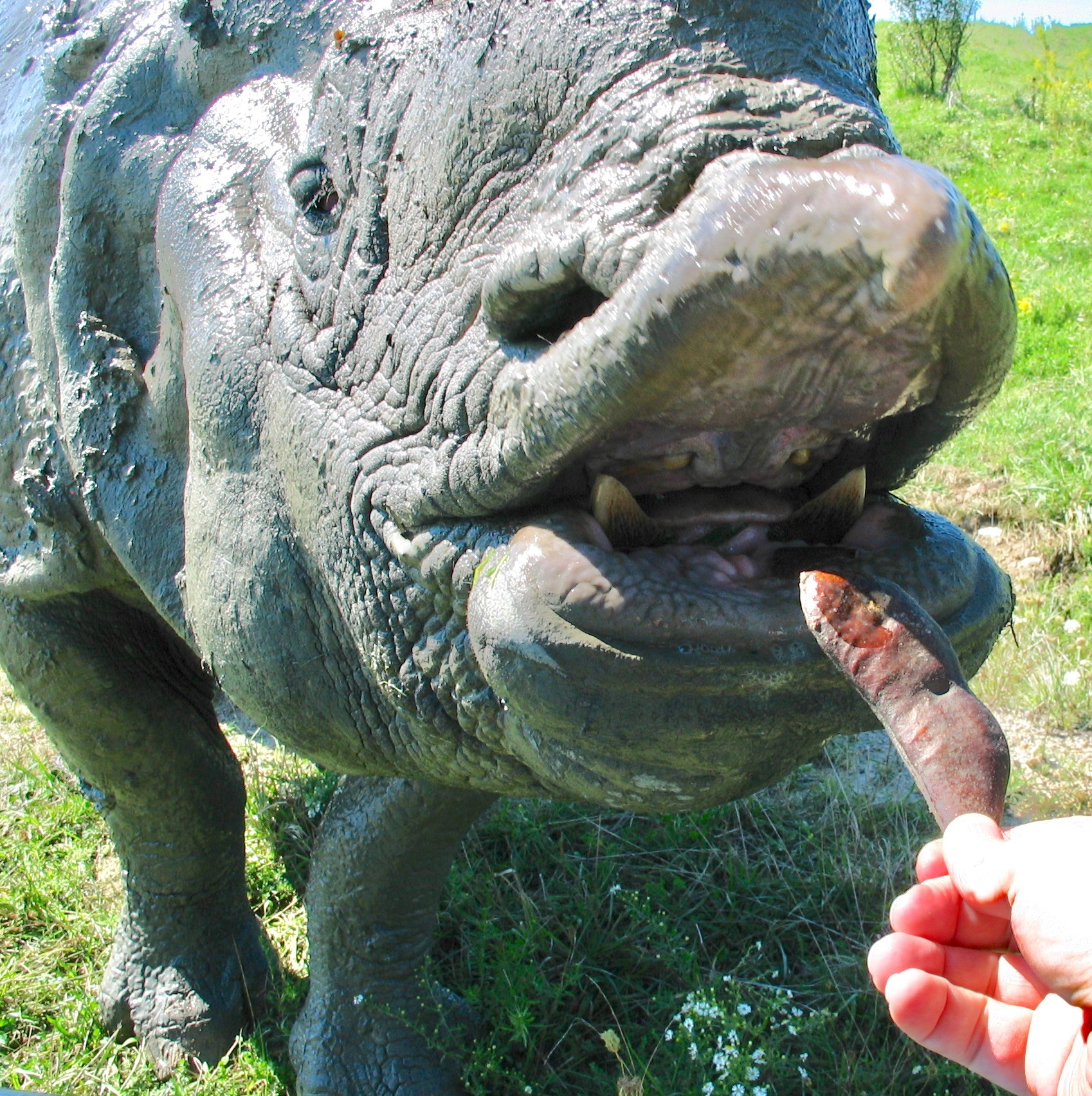
This Indian rhinoceros was happy to eat more than a dozen pulp-filled pods of Kentucky coffeetree, suggesting that its rhino ancestors in North America may have prompted the plant's megafaunal dispersal syndrome.

Seed dispersal syndromes are complexes of fruit traits that enable plants to disperse seeds by wind, water, or mobile animals. The kind of fruits that birds are attracted to eat are usually small, with only a thin protective skin, and the colors are red or dark shades of blue or purple. Fruits categorized as mammal syndrome are bigger than bird fruits. They may possess a tough rind or husk and emit a strong odor when ripe. Because mammals (other than primates) tend to have poor color vision, these fruits usually retain a dull coloration of brown, burnished yellow, orange, or will remain green when ripe. The megafaunal dispersal syndrome refers to those attributes of fruits that evolved in order to attract megafauna (animals that weigh or weighed more than 44 kilograms) as primary dispersal agents. Following the Late Pleistocene megafaunal extinctions, most species of large herbivores have become extinct outside of Africa (and to a lesser extent Asia), thereby reducing the effectiveness of seed dispersal—except for the fruits that attracted cultivation by humans.

=== Common megafaunal dispersal traits ===
- Large fruit, best suited to be consumed whole by large animals without seed loss.
- Fruit grows on or close to the trunk, or on stout branches.
- Indehiscent fruit that retains its seeds upon ripening.
- Seeds deter or elude being ground up by teeth through having a thick, tough or hard endocarp; or bitter, peppering or nauseating toxins. They are also difficult to separate from the pulp, which is tasty and soft, to deter seed spitting.
- The seeds benefit from—or even require—physical or chemical abrasion to germinate.
- If tropical, the fruit drops on or just before ripening, stopping monkeys from eating them. In colder climates, the fruit stays on the branch for a prolonged time, keeping it away from predation by ineffectual seed dispersers like rodents.
- "Looks, feels, smells, and tastes" like other fruits known to be dispersed by megafauna where megafauna still exists.

=== Ecological indicators of missing dispersal partners ===
- The fruit either rots where it falls or is ineffectually disseminated by current dispersal agents.
- The plant is more common where livestock (proxy for megafauna) are present.
- The seeds germinate and grow well in upland habitats where planted, but the species almost exclusively inhabits floodplains (where water flow disperses the seeds) in the wild.
- The geographic range is inexplicably patchy or restricted.

== Proposed examples in plants ==
=== Afrotropical realm ===
Extent of the Afrotropical biogeographical realm

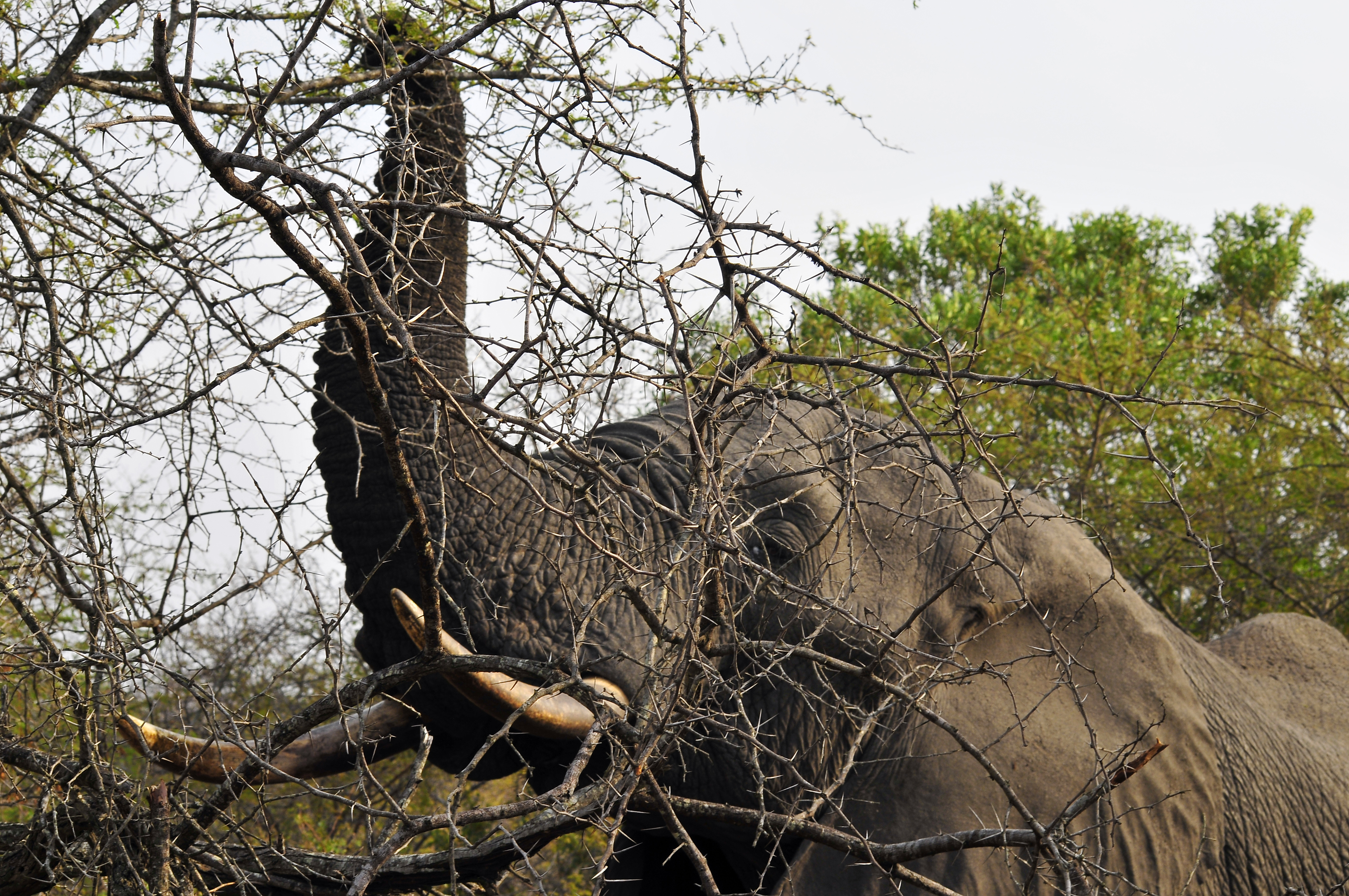
African bush elephant feeding on a tree with defensive spines

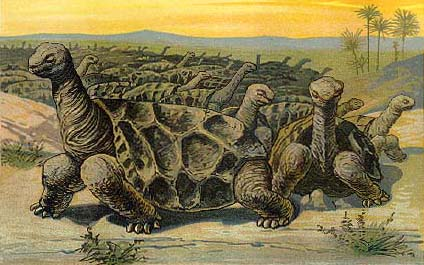
Restoration of a saddle-backed Mauritius giant tortoise herd

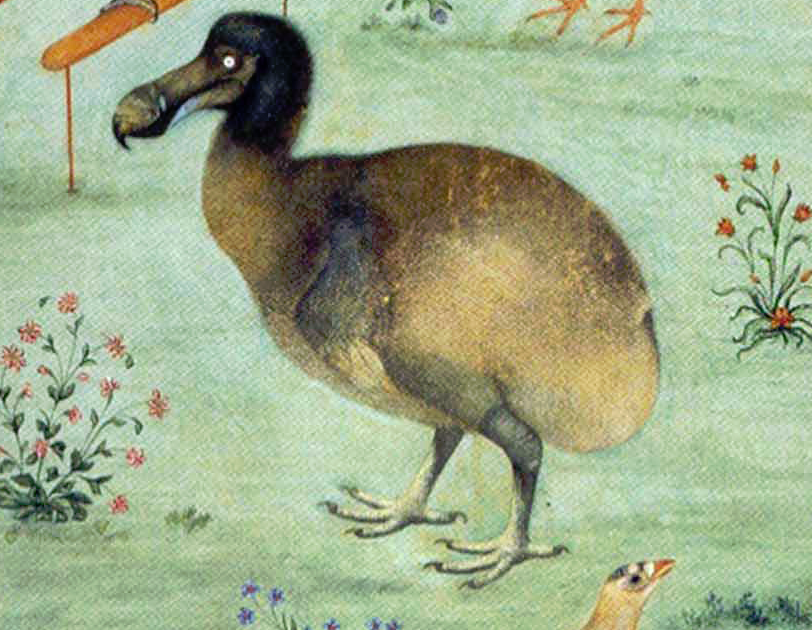
Living dodo depicted c. 1625

Example	Binomial name	Native range	Anachronism description	Suggested extinct coevolutionary partners
Balanites	Balanites wilsoniana	West and Central Africa	Extremely limited or unrecorded seed dispersal in areas where elephants were extirpated; at least one Kenyan forest lacks seedlings and younger trees altogether.	Forest elephant and bush elephant.
Bottle palms	Hyophorbe spp.	Mascarene Islands	Toxic, at least to humans, and resistant to trampling.	Five species of giant tortoises of the genus Cylindraspis lived in the islands before they were hunted to extinction in the 18th and 19th centuries.
	Canarium paniculatum	Mauritius	Hard seeds and fleshy pulp. Though common in the high forest vegetation, it has a poor regeneration rate.	
Double coconut	Lodoicea maldivica	Praslin and Curieuse islands (Seychelles)	The fruit weighs over 20 kg and contains the largest seeds in the world. No known animal eats the fruit, and the surviving trees appear to be the result of vegetative reproduction. Mature fruits do not float and are killed by sea water, unlike real coconuts. The species is not thought to have dispersed over water, but to have evolved locally in the Seychelles after they broke off from the Indian Plate 66 million years ago. No megafauna is known from the archipelago before the Seychelles giant tortoise arrived 23 million years ago; they eat much smaller fruit, and the distribution of tortoises and plants in the islands is inconsistent with co-dispersal.	
Île aux Aigrettes ebony	Diospyros egrettarum	Île aux Aigrettes off Mauritius	Fruit eaten by introduced Aldabra giant tortoises, which disperse the seeds successfully.	Cylindraspis.
Latan palms	Latania loddigesii L. lontaroides L. verschaffeltii	Mascarene Islands	One species per island, all with pyrena smaller than their relatives in continental Africa and Madagascar, which are dispersed by large mammals and birds; smaller fruits are consumed by tortoises. L. loddigesii is resistant to trampling.	The colonization of each island by the palms coincides with the arrival of giant tortoises.
Makak	Mimusops petiolaris	Mauritius	In decline due to the absence of animals removing its pulp. The fruit is colonized by fungi hyphae and the seeds rot without germinating. The fruit is only sporadically consumed by the Mauritian flying fox, which does not ingest the seeds.	
Mascarene amaranth	Aerva congesta	Mauritius and Rodrigues	Reduced to open barren areas on Round Island, its small prostrate form would protect it from grazing by tortoises.	Cylindraspis.
Mascarene grass	Zoysia tenuifolia	Mascarene Islands	Ignored by introduced Aldabra giant tortoises in favor of other grasses.	Cylindraspis.
Mascarene tussock-grass	Chrysopogon argutus	Mascarene Islands	Coarse, unpalatable leaves that are avoided by grazers like introduced rabbits when other grasses are available. Tussock-grass dominated Round Island before rabbits were removed, after which it immediately declined and was replaced by other native grasses.	Cylindraspis.
Mauritius dragon tree	Dracaena concinna	Mauritius	Resistant to trampling and capable of re-sprouting from damaged and flattened stems.	Cylindraspis.
Tambalacoque	Sideroxylon grandiflorum	Mauritius	Peach-sized fruit that ripens from green to brown, much larger than its relatives present in the island and which are eaten by flying birds. The seed is in fact too large to be ingested by flying birds, and introduced pigs and monkeys destroy the seeds rather than disperse them. The tambalacoque evolved locally from smaller-seeded species of the genus Sideroxylon (formerly Calvaria), which is found in Africa and Madagascar. Temple reported in 1977 that only 13 trees were left, all of them over three hundred years old, and that seeds could not germinate at all without being ingested and abraded first. However, these claims have since been debunked.	Temple proposed that the tambalacoque had a strict mutualist relation with the dodo, extinct since c.1662. Critics argued that the seeds were dispersed by a giant tortoise instead, and that the tambalacoque might even have descended from seeds contained in a tortoise drifting from Madagascar, as tortoises are buoyant and colonize islands easily. In the Galapagos, ingestion by giant tortoises reduces seed dormancy in the Galapagos wild tomato, Solanum galapagense. Two species of giant tortoise were present in Mauritius before being hunted to extinction in the 18th century, the saddle-backed and domed Mauritius giant tortoise. However, the seeds have a harder cover than those eaten by tortoises, which have no gizzard; this might imply to a mutualistic relation with a bird after all, and the dodo was the only bird large enough to ingest the seeds. In any case, it was later found that germination was not favored by ingestion and abrasion of the seeds, but by pulp removal. The fruit that remains whole is colonized by fungi and its seeds rot. The broad-billed parrot was also a large bird, although a flying one, and had an even more powerful beak than the dodo. The Mauritian giant skink is presumed to have been omnivorous. The coconut crab existed formerly in Mauritius, but has since disappeared from the island.

==== Madagascar ====
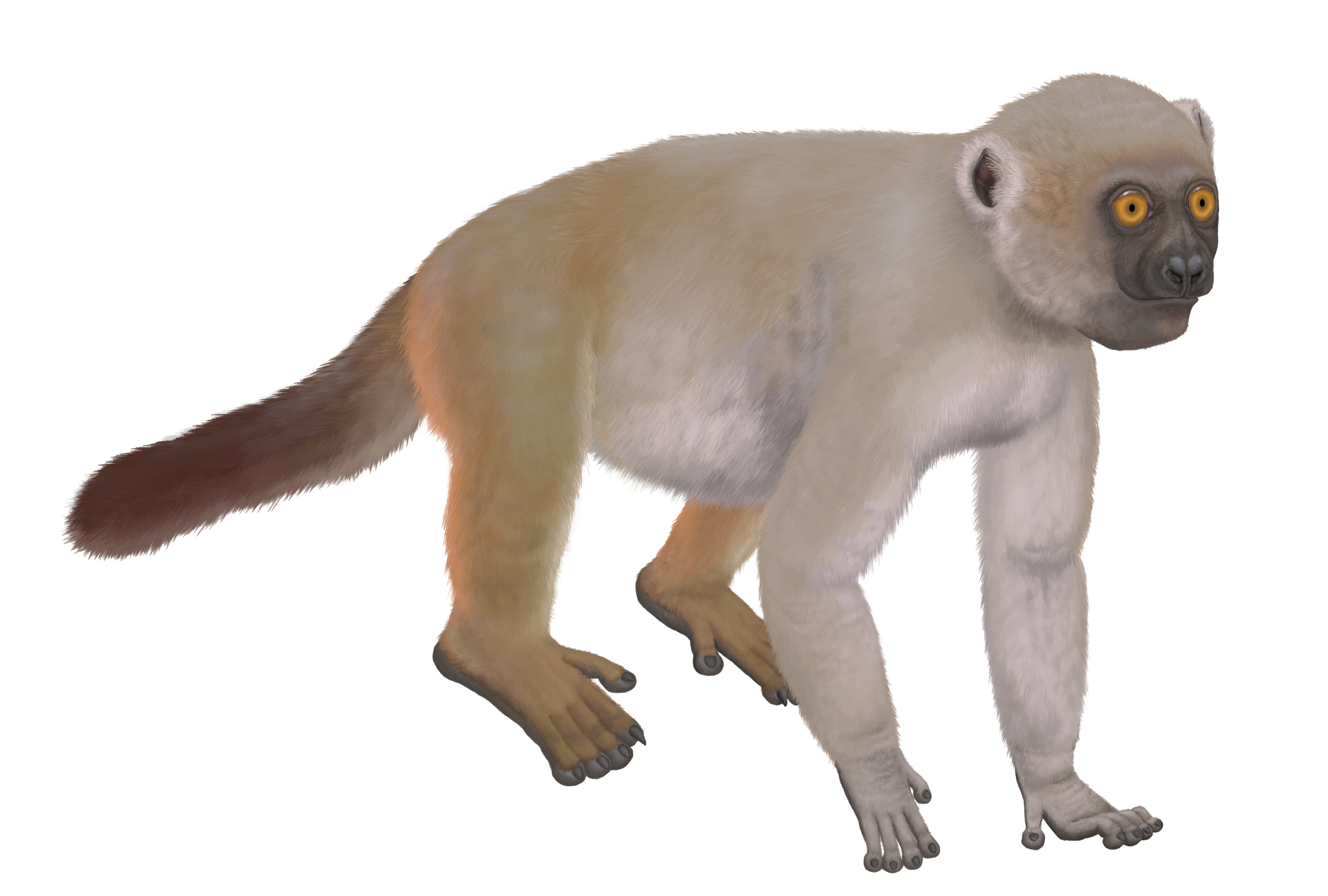
Hadropithecus restoration

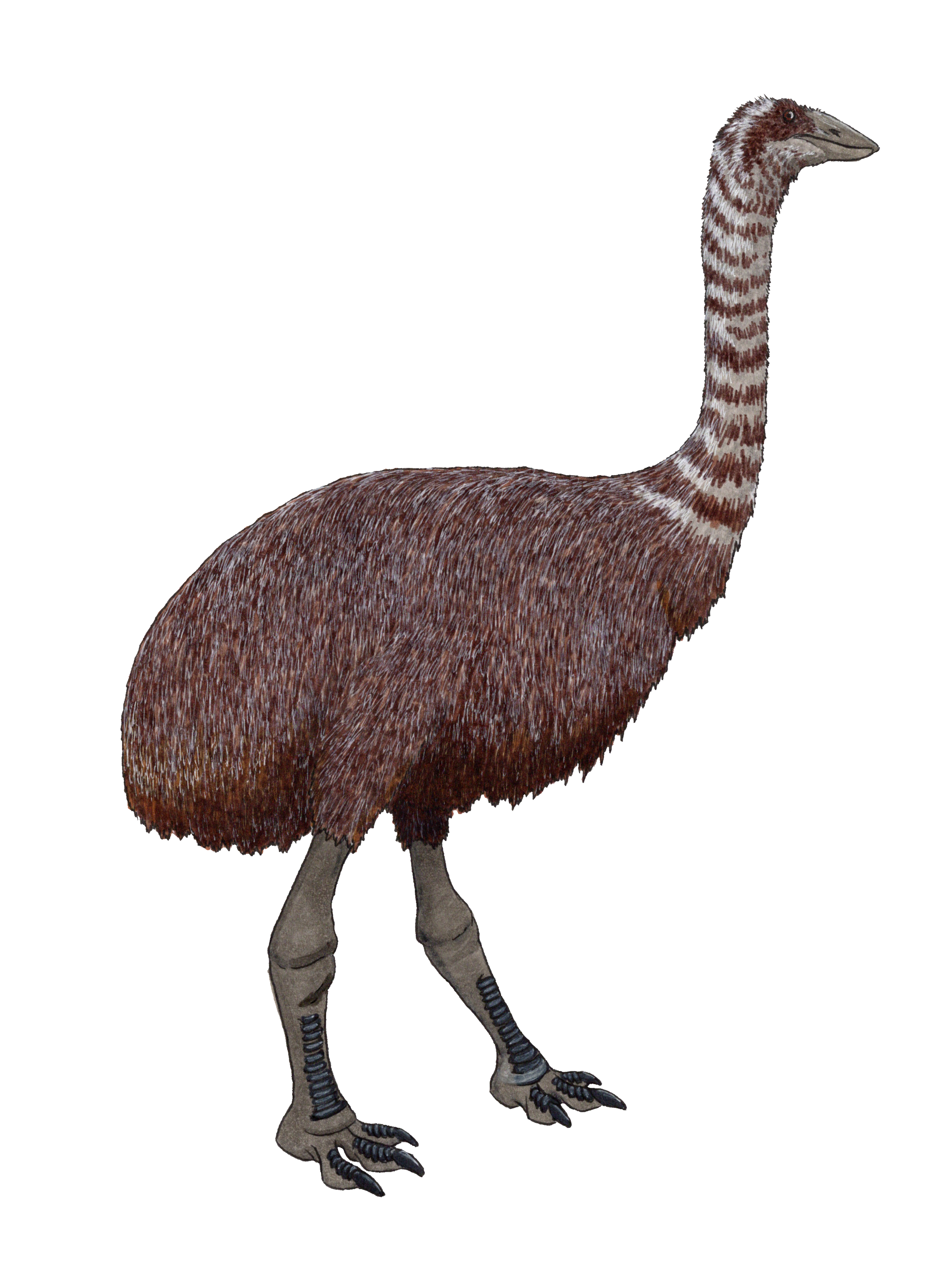
Elephant bird restoration

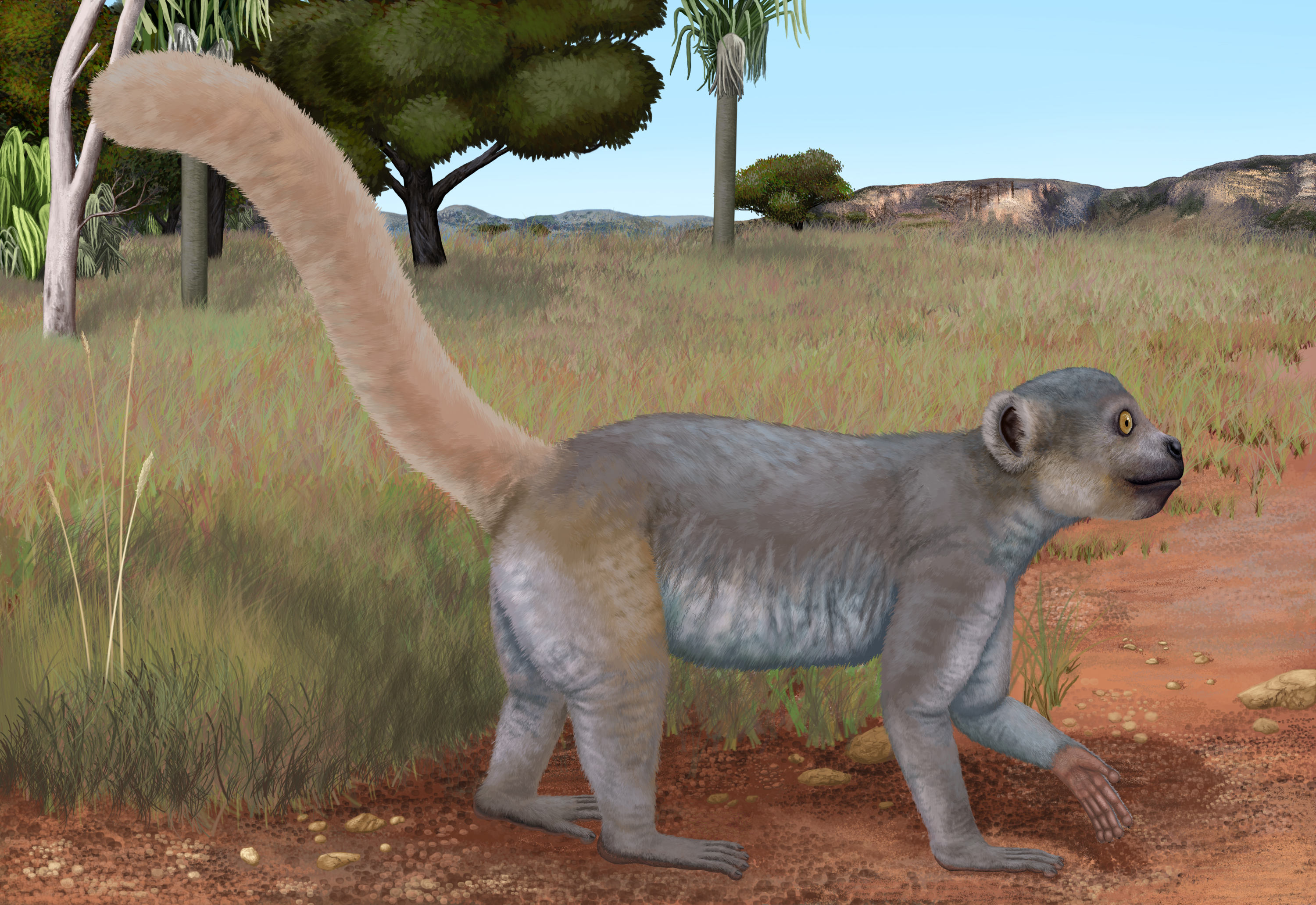
Archaeolemur restoration

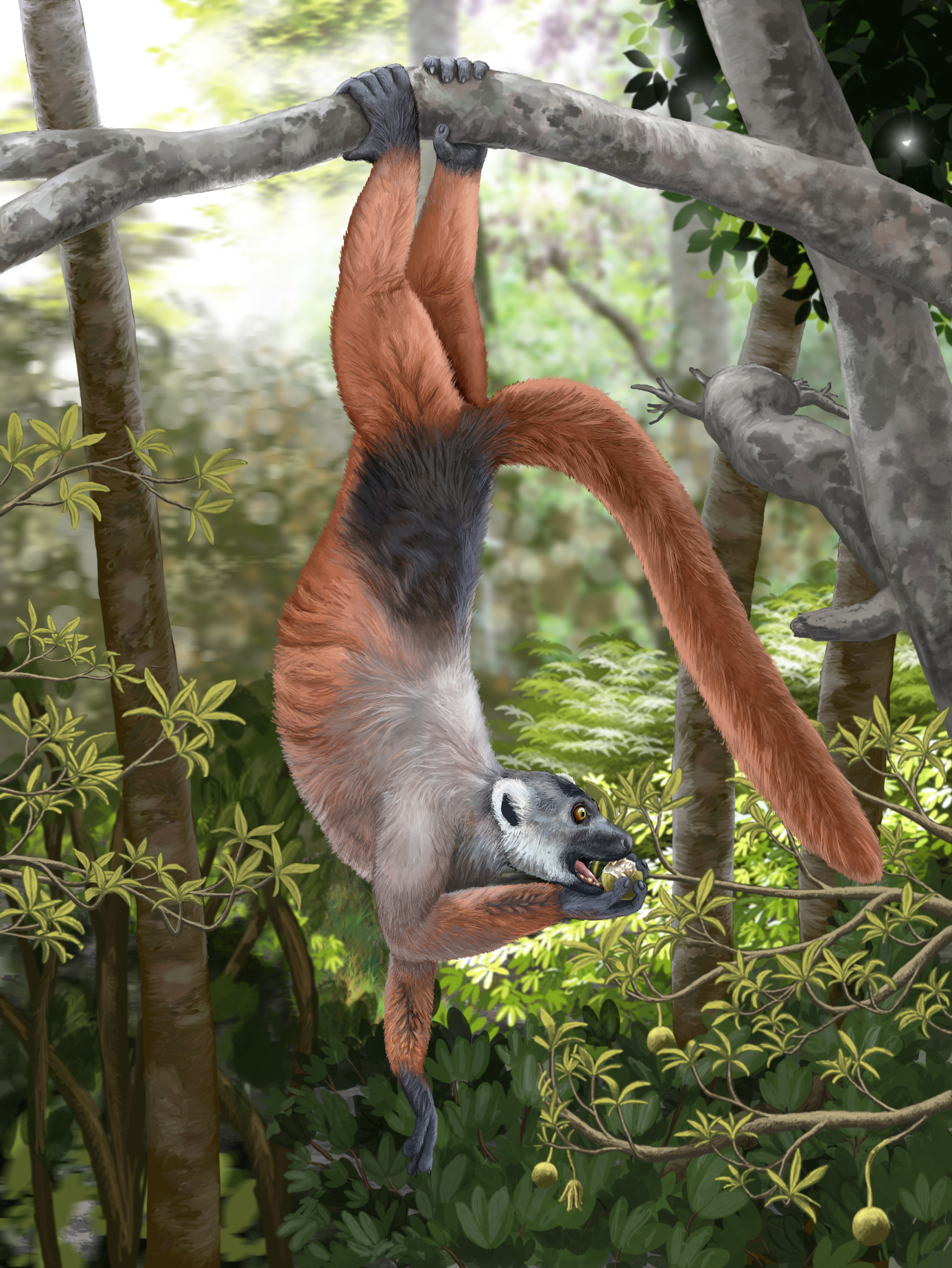
Pachylemur restoration

Example	Binomial name	Native range	Anachronism description	Suggested extinct coevolutionary partners
	Alluaudia spp.	Southwestern Madagascar	Heavily spined stems, apparently as defense against climbing browsers, but browsing lemurs are rare in their area of distribution. The only known living predator is the ring-tailed lemur.	Isotope testing shows that the extinct monkey lemur genera Mesopropithecus and Hadropithecus likely fed on these plants.
Borassoid and arecoid palms	Borassus spp. Hyphaene spp. Bismarckia spp. Satranala decussilvae Voanioala gerardii Orania spp. Lemurophoenix halleuxii	Madagascar	Large seeded palms. Their relatives outside Madagascar are dispersed by elephants, bats, orangutans, baboons, capuchin monkeys, peccaries and tapirs.	Elephant bird.
	Commiphora guillaminii	Western Madagascar	Endozoochorous dry forest tree with high genetic variation among subpopulations at the local scale but similar genetic differentiation among populations at the regional scale as relatives in South Africa, suggesting that the dispersal distance shrunk in the recent past.	Giant lemurs.
Dilobeia	Dilobeia tenuinervis D. thouarsii	Eastern Madagascar	Fruit with a single seed measuring 3–4 cm by 2-2.5 cm, too large to be dispersed by any extant animal in Madagascar.	
Grandidier's baobab Suarez baobab	Adansonia grandidieri A. suarezensis	Madagascar	Fruit with fragile pericarp, tasty and nutritious pulp, and seeds with a tough, thick testa, clearly adapted for animal dispersal but lacking any known disperser. Relatives in continental Africa dispersed by elephants and baboons. Very restricted geographic distribution.	Archaeolemur, a semiterrestrial, generalist lemur similar to a baboon that disappeared in the Middle Ages, and Pachylemur, a close relative of the black-and-white ruffed lemur, but larger and more robust.
Malagasy pandan	Pandanus utilis	Madagascar, Mauritius and Seychelles	Large seeds of variable size with hard cover. Sharp serrated leaf edges and young plants resistant to trampling.	The largest seeds may have been eaten by lemurs slightly larger than extant species, while the leaves and young plants would resist predation by giant tortoises.
Malagasy wire plants	Several unrelated species	Madagascar	Plants convergent with New Zealand's divaricating plants, adapted to resist browsing by large birds, rather than like their continental African relatives, which have defenses against ungulate browsers.	Elephant bird.
Ramy nut	Canarium madagascariense	Madagascar	Fruits 6–7 cm long and 4–5 cm wide, with substantial flesh and a single seed 4 cm long and 2 cm wide. The flesh is eaten by aye-ayes but rarely whole, and they may be satiated without removing all the flesh from the seed, indicating that they are not the intended disperser. Its Asian relatives are dispersed by large parrots and hornbills.	Elephant bird and Pachylemur.
Traveller's tree	Ravenala madagascariensis	Madagascar	Plants often thrive and even form monocultures in degraded areas, due to their efficient vegetative reproduction. Hard, one centimeter long seeds, not adapted for wind or water dispersal, surrounded by odoriferous, light blue arils. The only viable seeds were found in the manure of the black-and-white ruffed lemur, the largest living lemur.	Pachylemur.

=== Australasian realm ===
Extent of the Australasian biogeographical realm

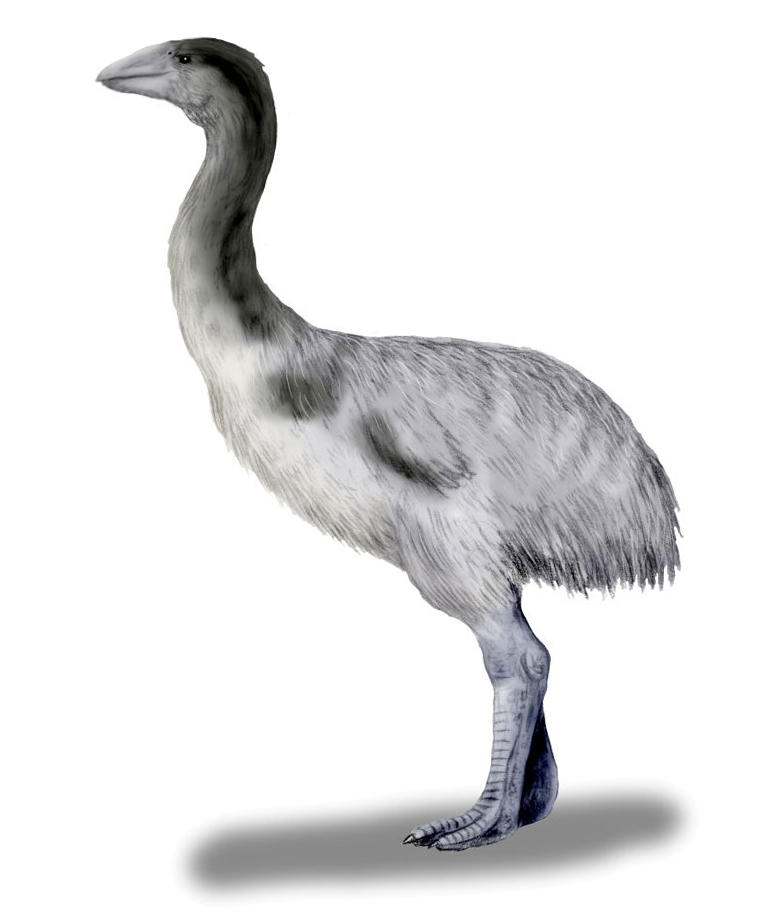
Genyornis restoration

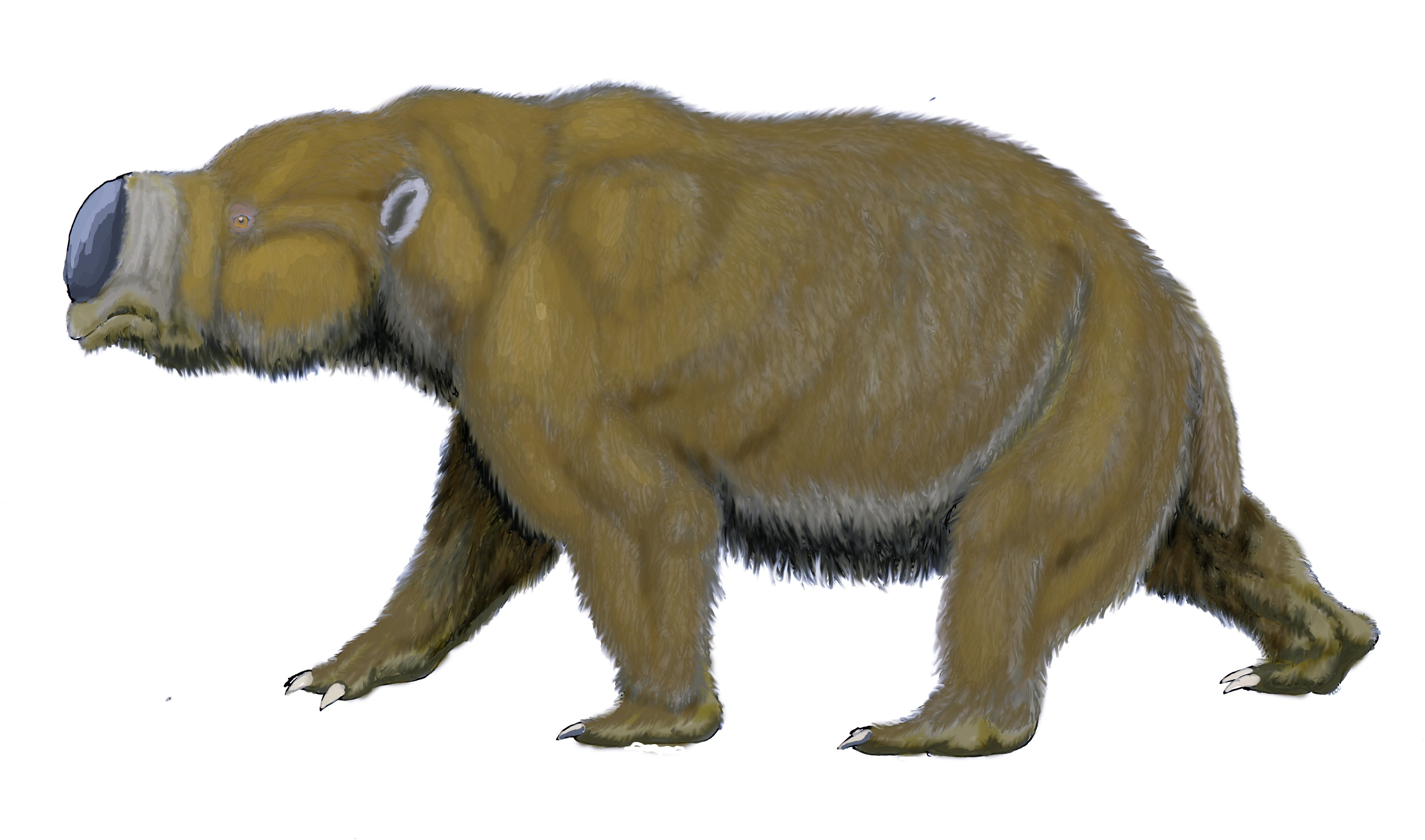
Diprotodon restoration

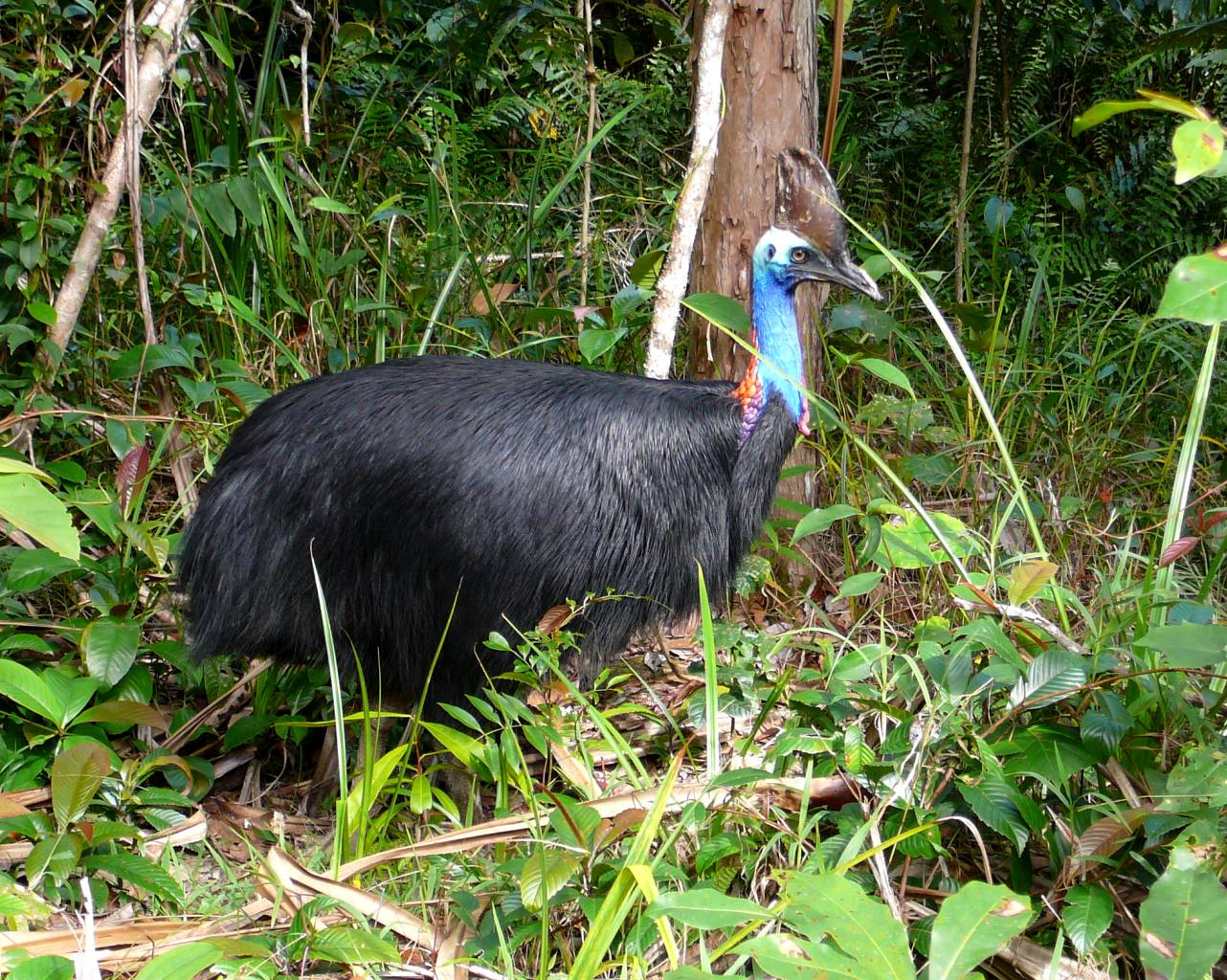
Southern cassowary

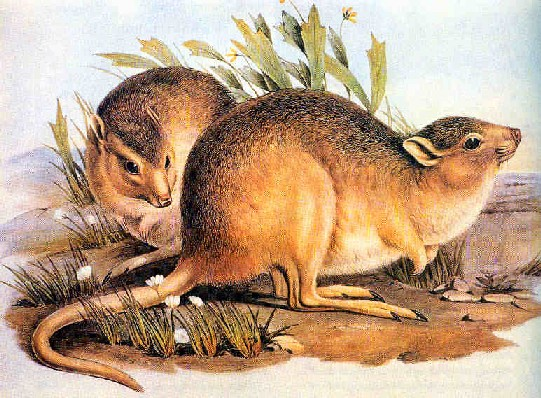
Desert rat-kangaroo illustration

Example	Binomial name	Native range	Anachronism description	Suggested extinct coevolutionary partners
Birds-nest wattle Needle wattle	Acacia pickardii A. carneorum	Central Australia	Endangered spiny plants with extremely patchy populations. Both have low seed regeneration and reproduce mainly clonally.	
Bowgada	Acacia ramulosa	Central Australia	Unlike related species, the seeds are too large to be dispersed by ants and their low energy-to-water ratio make them unattractive to birds. The large legumes can be found directly beneath the shrub, in abundance and unopened, months after the end of the fruiting season. Defensive spines are also common, despite consumption of Acacia leaves by living marsupials being generally rare.	
Burrawang	Macrozamia spp.	Australia	Poor seed dispersal in spite of bright red, fleshy coatings. Brushtail possums eat the flesh but rarely carry the seeds. Many fruits fall in place and rot on the ground.	Genyornis.
Bush tomato	Solanum spp.	Australia	Several species with a variable amount of defensive spines in the branches. The most spiny live in the Australian desert, where browsing marsupials are most rare.	
Crystal Creek walnut	Endiandra floydii	Queensland-New South Wales border	Rare rainforest species with a massive seed per fruit	Cassowaries.
Cypress-pine	Callitris spp.	Australia	Fossil pollen records show great abundance 50,000 years ago (after the extinction of the megafauna) compared to 100,000 years ago, despite the climate being similar and in contrast to other tree species which declined.	There is direct evidence of predation by Diprotodon.
	Dacrydium guillauminii	New Caledonia	Critically endangered and limited to New Caledonia in the present, but pollen records show that it was also present in Australia before the Last Glacial Maximum. It is mostly found in the margins of streams and the seeds are dispersed by large birds.	Extinct flightless birds.
Desert lime	Citrus glauca	Eastern and southern Australia	Defensive spines up to seven centimeters long.	Giant marsupials.
Durobby	Syzygium moorei	Mount Warning, New South Wales	Large fruit and very small distribution.	Cassowaries.
Hairy walnut	Endiandra pubens	New South Wales and Queensland	Massive red fruit compared to other rainforest fruits	Cassowaries.
Idiot fruit	Idiospermum australiense	Daintree lowlands, Mount Bellenden Ker and Mount Bartle Frere in Tropical North Queensland	A primitive angiosperm with close relatives from the Middle Cretaceous. Produces the largest seeds of any plant in Australia (225 grams), which are only sporadically dispersed by gravity and water. Present naturally in only two locations 130 km apart and restricted mostly to low elevations and the margins of streams, yet translocation experiments found that the species germinates easily in upland rainforests. The seeds are nutritious but contain neurotoxins lethal to small mammals and cattle. Cassowaries are known to avoid them. The fruit has no pulp, but the seeds are easily divided into cotyledons, each of which can produce a different seedling. A large-jawed mammal might be able to feed on the seeds and disperse some of the seedlings uphill, if cotyledons fell from the mouth while chewing.	Dinosaurs, Dromornis, Diprotodon.
Lady apple	Syzygium suborbiculare	Northern Australia and Papua New Guinea	Tasty, red, apple-sized fruits encasing big round seeds, with no animals in their native range suited to eat them.	Genyornis.
Leopardwood	Flindersia dissosperma F. maculosa	Inland Australia	Several defensive measures against large browsers, including wide, divaricate angle of branching, stiff and spiky twig tips, and small leaves widely separated along branchlets. The defensive measures are lost when the plant reaches four meters, way above the reach of the largest local browsers - swamp and rock wallabies.	Browsing flightless birds.
Myall Creek wattle	Acacia atrox	Tamworth, New South Wales	Spiny species found only in two stands. Low seed regeneration and mostly clonal reproduction.	
Narrow-leafed bumble tree	Capparis loranthifolia	Australia		
Nutwood	Terminalia arostrata	Western Australia, Northern Territory and Queensland	Defenses against browsers lost around four meters tall, like the divaricate growth pattern.	Browsing flightless birds.
	Oldenlandia gibsonii	Gladstone, Queensland	Spiny and divaricate shrub, also the only woody member of its genus in Australia.	Browsing megafauna.
Omphalea	Omphalea queenslandiae	Queensland	12.5 cm wide fruit similar to African and Asian fruits dispersed by elephants.	Giant marsupials.
Pincushion tree	Hakea spp.	Australia	Spiny leaves that are not eaten by any living mammal. At least one species (H. eyreana) has camouflaged flowers, despite no living animal browsing it.	Dromornithids.
Rosewood tree	Alectryon oleifolius	Australia	Trees growing in semi-circular stands sprouted around ancient burrow systems, possibly in soil once covered by dung of digging megafauna.	Giant rat kangaroos and Phascolonus.
Scrub guava	Siphonodon australis	Northeastern Australia	Big musky fruit.	Diprotodon.
Southern ironwood	Acacia estrophiolata	Central Australia	Intricately branched and tangled with small phyllodes at shrub level; erect and with long pendulous phyllodes at tree level.	
Spiny everlasting	Acanthocladium dockeri	Laura, South Australia	Woody, spiny herbaceous species with relatives that are neither woody nor spiny. Presumed extinct until 1992, when a few clonal populations were discovered.	Browsing megafauna.
Spiny peppercress	Lepidium aschersonii	Eastern and Western Australia	Woody, spiny herbaceous species with relatives that are neither woody nor spiny. Only a few widely scattered populations remaining.	Browsing megafauna.
Touriga	Mammea touriga	Tropical Queensland	Large-fruited plant with a restricted range. A close relative, M. africana, is dispersed by elephants in Congo.	Giant marsupials.
Vicious hairy Mary	Calamus radicalis	Daintree rainforest	Defensive spines.	Giant marsupials.
Waddywood	Acacia peuce	Margins of the Simpson Desert	Three anti-browser responses depending on its height: at grass level, the plant is soft but has a strong smell similar to stale urine, and induces headaches in humans; at shrub level, the plant is densely branched and has rigid, sharply pointed and outwardly reaching phyllodes; and at tree level (starting between two and three meters), the plant grows vertically, with soft phyllodes, and sheds all the rigid ones. However, the largest mammal in the area, the red kangaroo, rarely reaches two meters and is a grazer, not a browser. There are only three disjunct populations, but genetic testing shows that each is highly diverse, and similar in its genetic makeup to the others, indicating that they are recent remnants of a larger range area. Seed regeneration is low and the species reproduces mainly clonally. The dense phyllodes of the shrub stage make it very vulnerable to fire, which might be another reason for its decline, as forest fires increased after the extinction of the megafauna.	Browsing megafauna.
White bark	Endiandra compressa	Eastern Australia	Northern populations widespread and dispersed by cassowaries; southern populations restricted to stream banks.	Pygmy cassowary.
Wild orange	Capparis mitchellii	Australia	Large, round fruits, with drab color and alluring aroma, typical of fruits ingested by mammals. Hooked spines also present.	Diprotodon.
Wild pomegranate	Capparis canescens	Northeastern Australia		

==== New Zealand ====
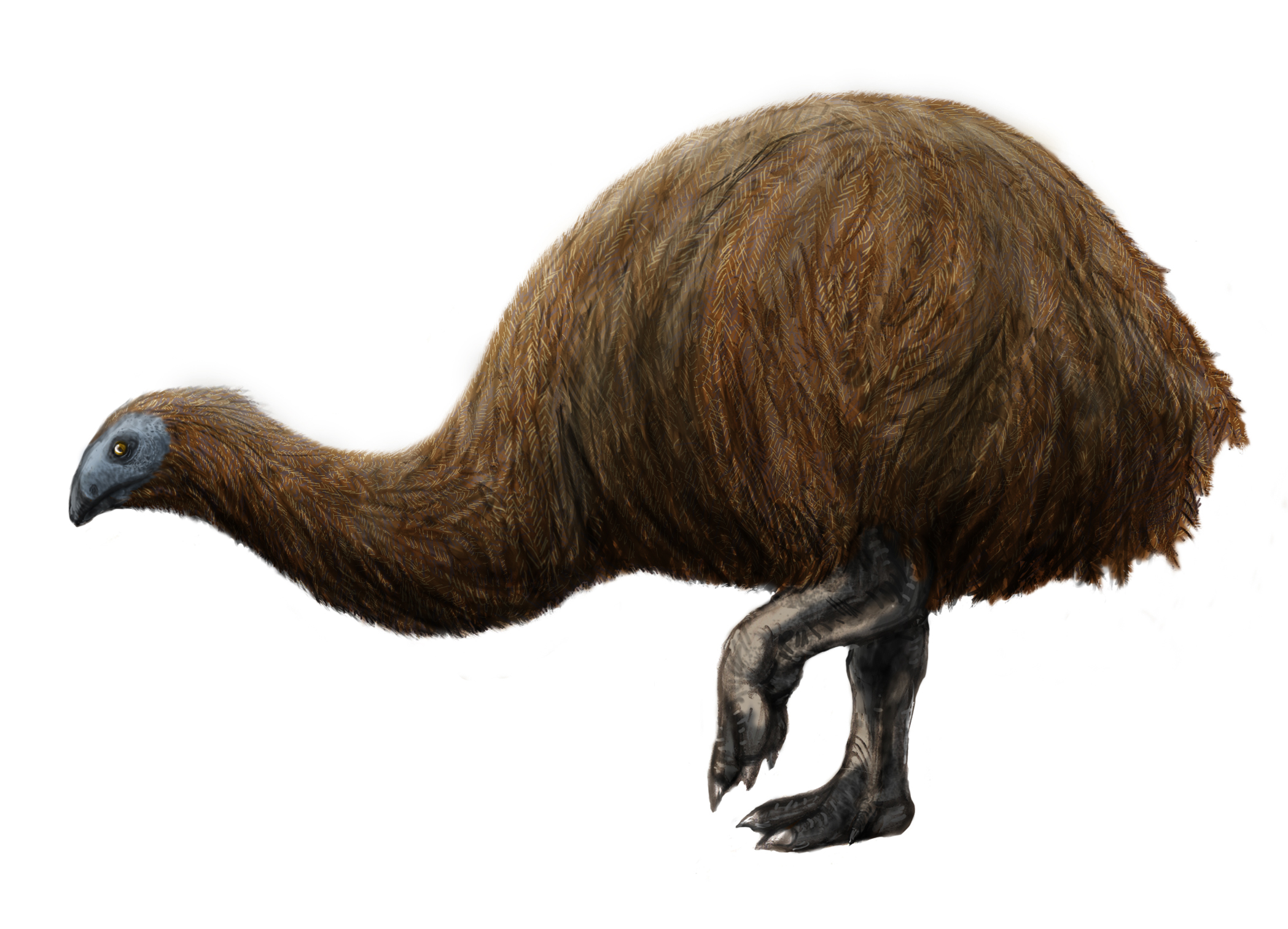
Restoration of a broad-billed moa, possibly the last moa species to become extinct

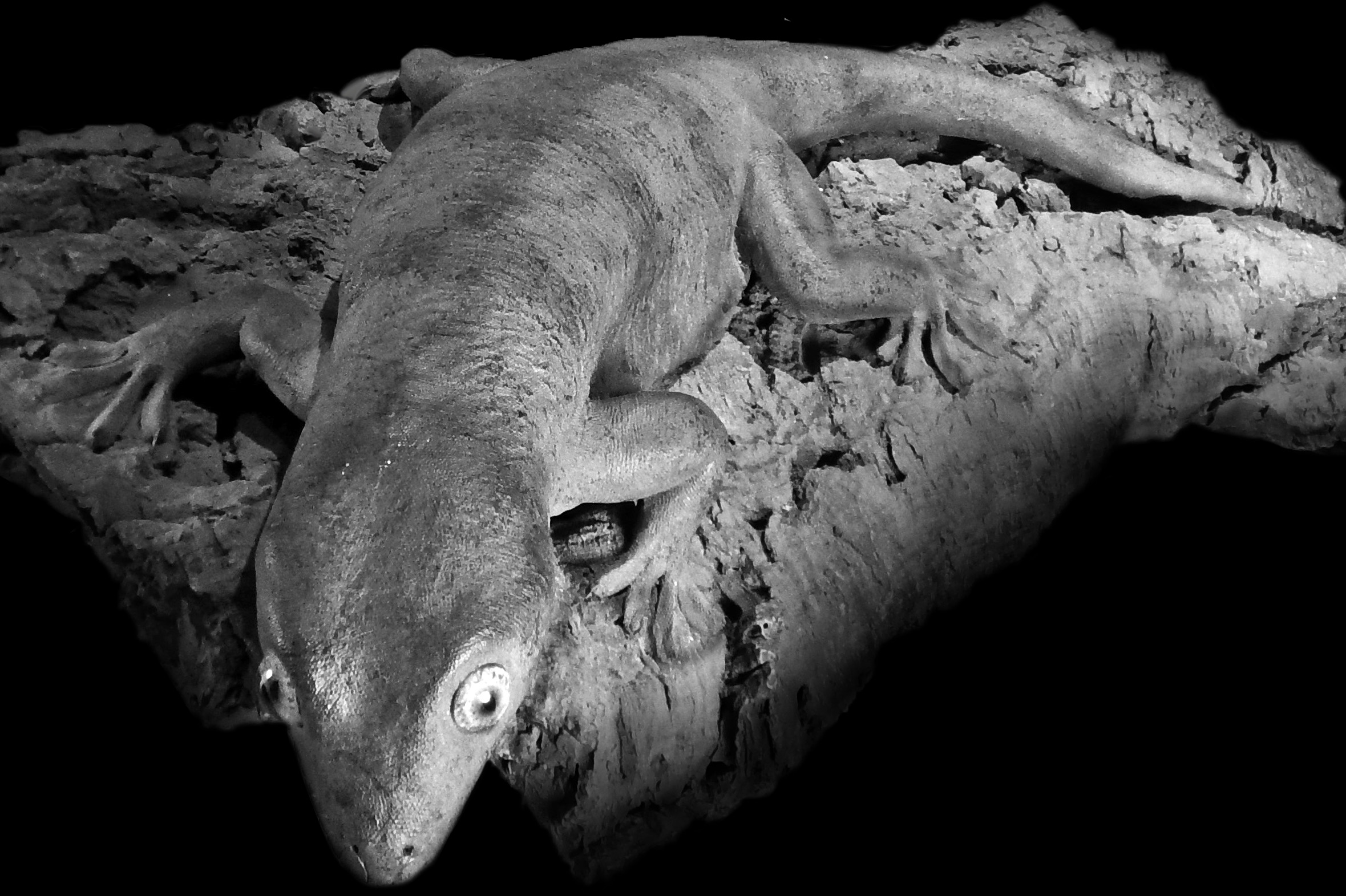
Restoration of Hoplodactylus delcourti, a giant gecko of uncertain origin that is identified by some as the kawekaweau

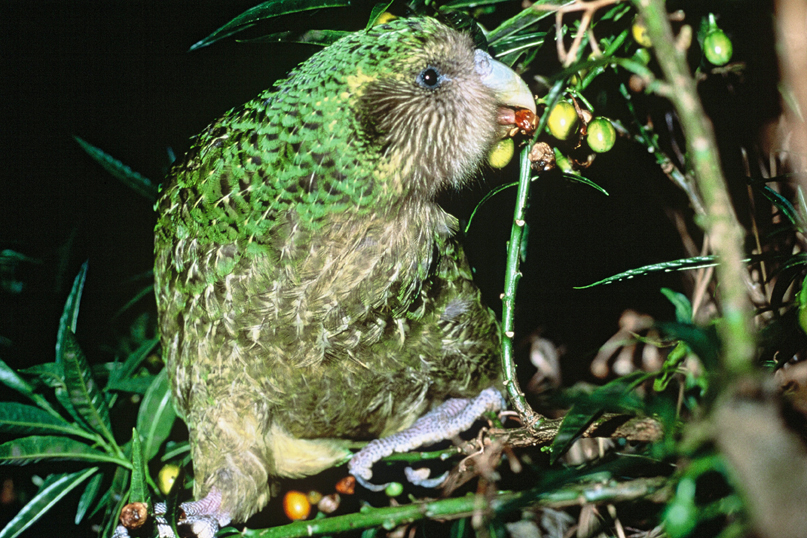
Kākāpō feeding on poroporo fruit

Example	Binomial name	Native range	Anachronism description	Suggested extinct coevolutionary partners
Divaricating plants of New Zealand	54 unrelated species	New Zealand	10% of New Zealand plants have a divaricating pattern of growth (i.e. they grow in thickets), a much larger proportion than elsewhere in the world. Like spines, a divaricating growth pattern reduces the action of large browsers, but it is more effective against browsing birds, while spines are more effective against browsing mammals. However, the only large browsers in New Zealand today are introduced deer. These defenses disappear three meters above ground, at most.	Moas - the larger species in particular, which have been identified as browsers from their preserved gizzard contents. The largest species of all, the South Island giant moa, matches the height where the plant defenses disappear.
Karaka	Corynocarpus laevigatus	New Zealand, including the Chatham Islands	Fruit with typical lizard dispersal syndrome features like most plants in New Zealand, but too large to be swallowed by any wild animal in the islands.	The kawekaweau, an undescribed giant gecko last observed in 1870.
Tussock grass	Several unrelated species	New Zealand		Moas.
Wood rose	Dactylanthus taylorii	North Island	Abundant pollen found in Medieval coprolites of kākāpō from the South Island, in an area where neither species is found today. Only known pollinator in the present is the lesser short-tailed bat.	Kākāpō and other birds.

=== Indomalayan realm ===
Extent of the Indomalayan biogeographical realm

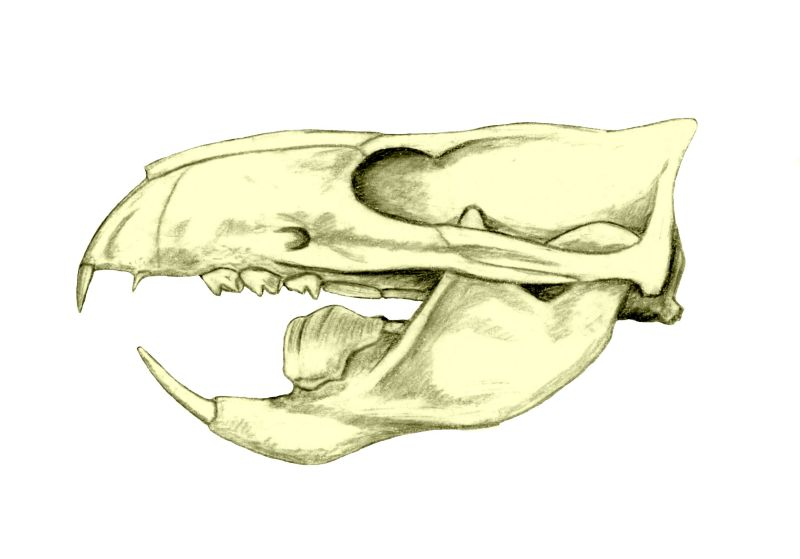
Fossil skull of Ptilodus mediaevus, a rodent-like multituberculate

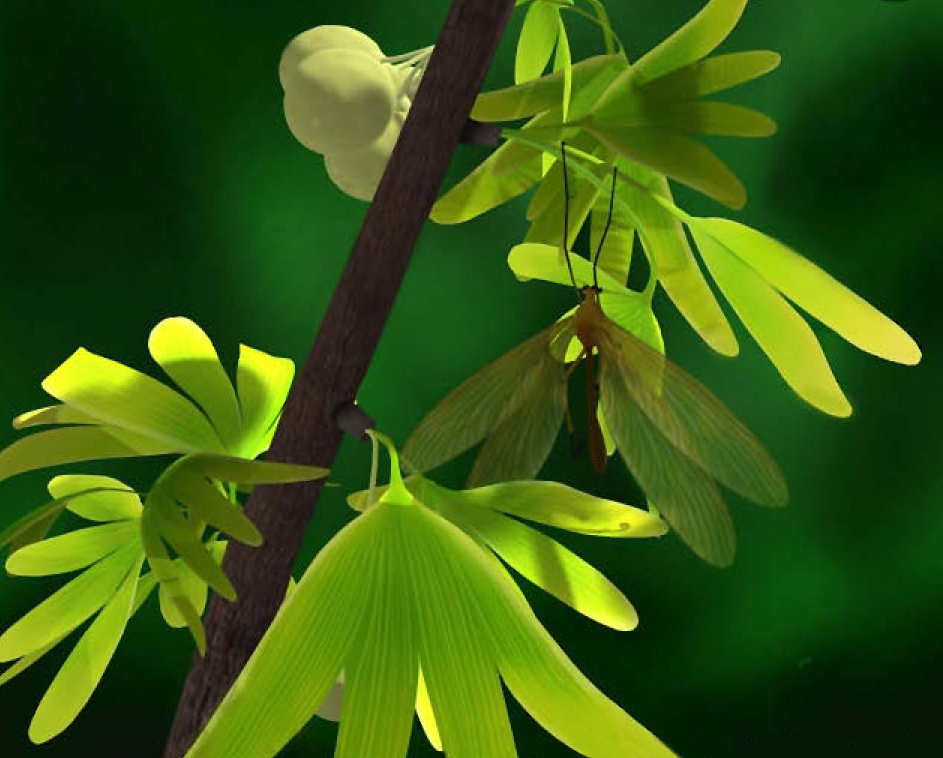
Restoration of Juracimbrophlebia, a ginkgo-mimicring mecopteran from Middle Jurassic China

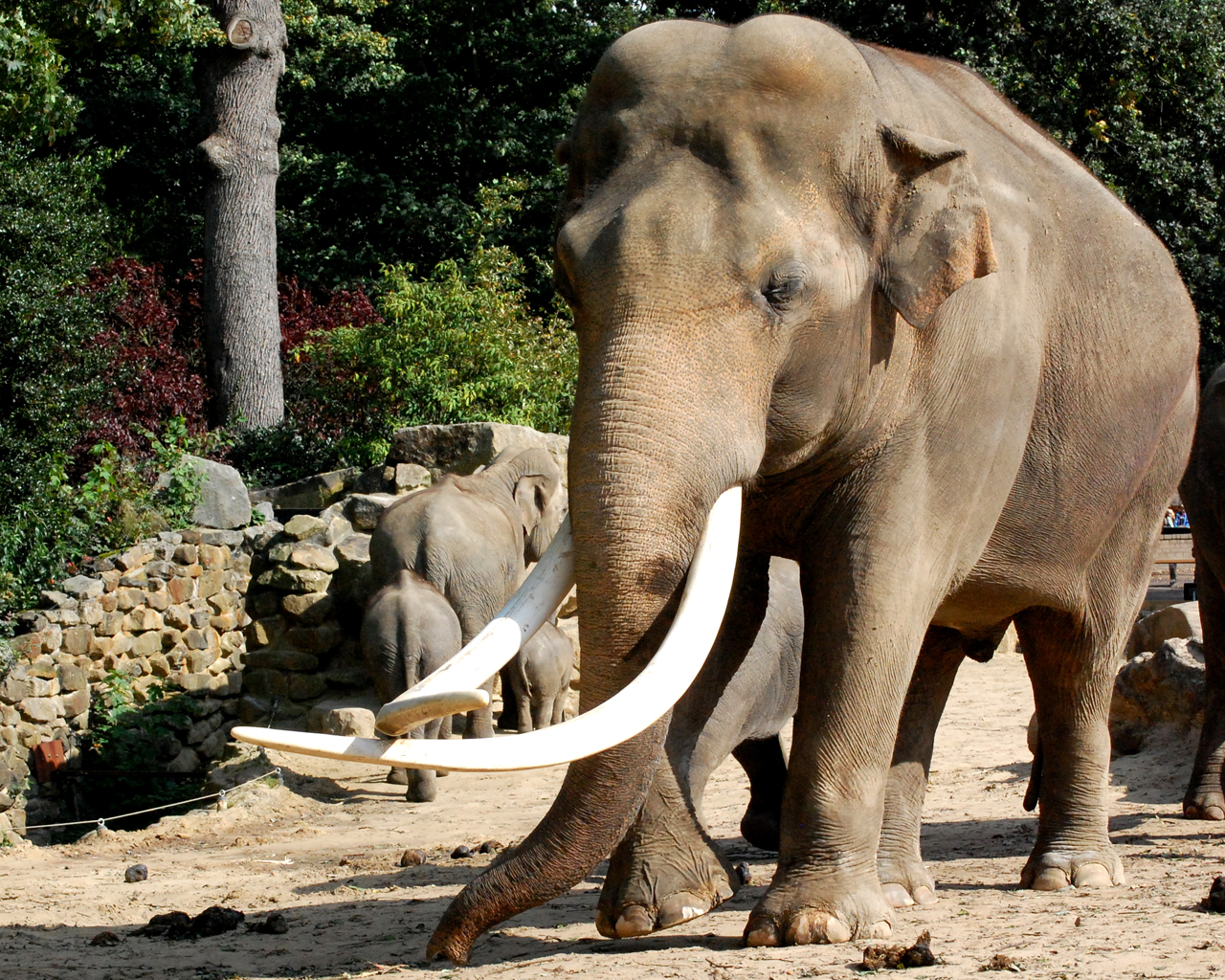
Asian elephant

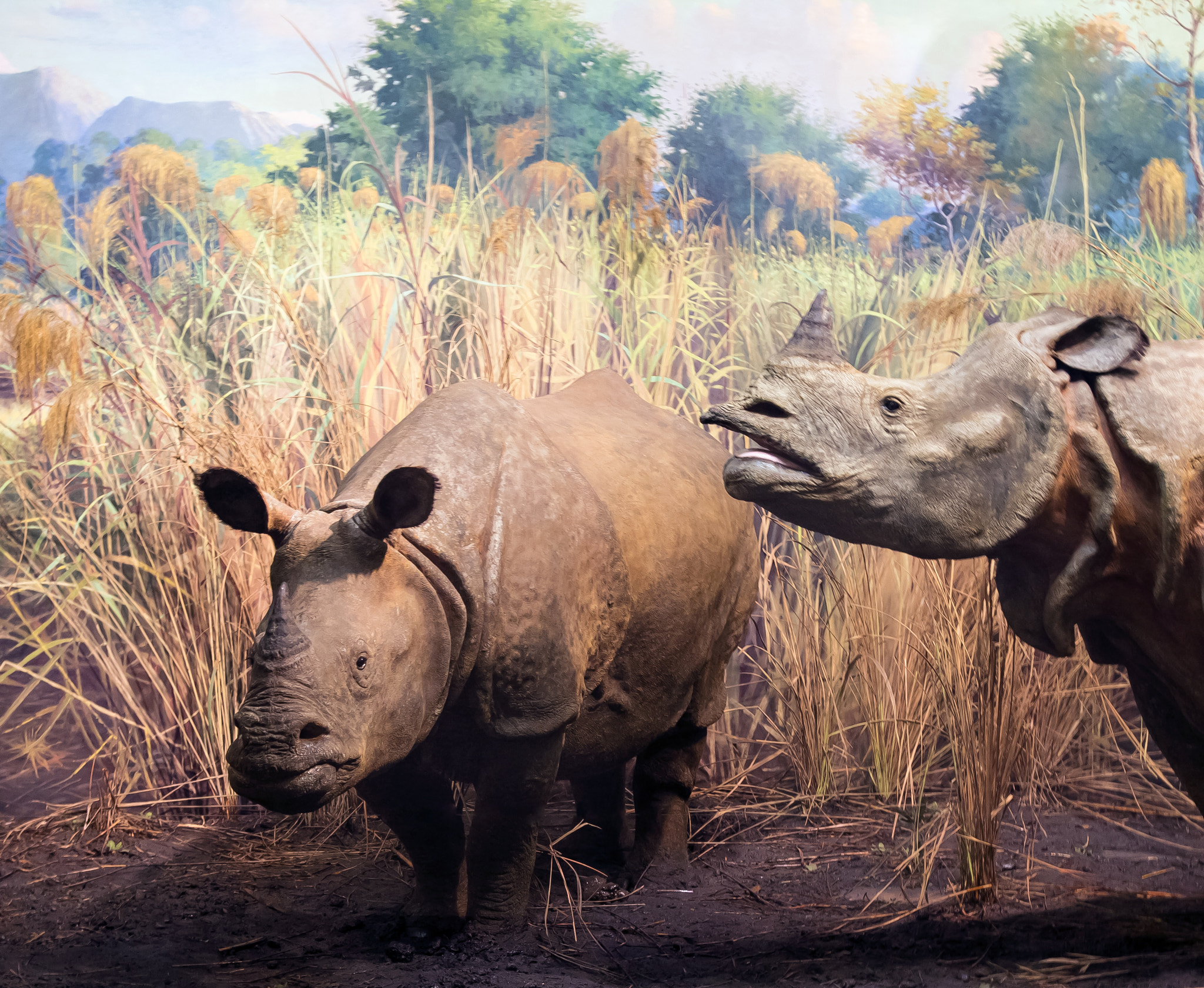
Taxidermied Javan rhinoceros, the most endangered ungulate in the world

Example	Binomial name	Native range	Anachronism description	Suggested extinct coevolutionary partners
Ginkgo	Ginkgo biloba	Southern China	An extreme living fossil, its genus existed already in the Jurassic and the species might go back to the Middle Cretaceous. Ginkgos were widespread through the Northern Hemisphere until the Paleocene, survived in North America until the end of the Miocene, and in Europe and Japan until the Pleistocene. Seeds are protected by a shell too fragile to deter mammals, since they are capable of mastication, but the pulp is poisonous to frugivores (including humans). Red-bellied tree squirrels (in China) and eastern gray squirrels (in North American parks and plantations) are known to extract seeds from the pulp and store them, but are only secondary dispersers. Fallen diaspores smell like rotten flesh after a few days on the ground, attracting carnivorans like the masked palm civet, leopard cat, and raccoon dog, which eat them whole; however, their marking of their territory through defecation also limits their ability as seed dispersers. Pollination is exclusively by the wind, but the chemical profile of pollination drops is similar to those of insect-pollinated, or mixed wind and insect-pollinated Gnetophyta.	Squirrel-like multituberculates, particularly Ptilodus. Small carrion-eating dinosaurs both lived on the ground and lacked the powerful masticatory apparatus and gizzard stones of vegetarian species. Several extinct, early pollinating insect lineages are known from the Middle Jurassic to the Early Cretaceous, before modern flowers evolved. Most are long-proboscid scorpion flies (Mecoptera), including Juracimbrophlebia, whose shape mimicked ginkgo leaves. The unusual trunk and root growth pattern may have evolved in a pre-angiosperm world where the main competitors of the ginkgo were tree ferns, cycads and cycadeoids.
Plum-Yew	Cephalotaxus spp.	East Asia	Gymnosperm widespread through the Northern Hemisphere in the Tertiary.	Multituberculates.
Rafflesia	Rafflesia spp.	Southeast Asia	Between 14 and 28 species of dioecious parasitic plants with no visible stems, branches or leaves, but that produce enormous red flowers with a fetid, carrion-like smell. The smell attracts flies but they are poor pollinators. The fruits are giant berries around 14 centimeters long, with woody, cryptic cover; and smooth, oily flesh which smells and tastes like overripe coconut. The only observed dispersers are small rodents and treeshrews that eat part of the pulp and sometimes swallow seeds. Most species are endangered and have disjunct and extremely limited ranges.	The original main pollinators might have been dung or carrion-eating beetles that became rarer as the megafauna declined. The Asian elephant, Javan rhinoceros and Sumatran rhinoceros all used to, but are no longer present in Rafflesia's range, and might have been its intended seed dispersers.

=== Nearctic realm ===
Extent of the Nearctic realm

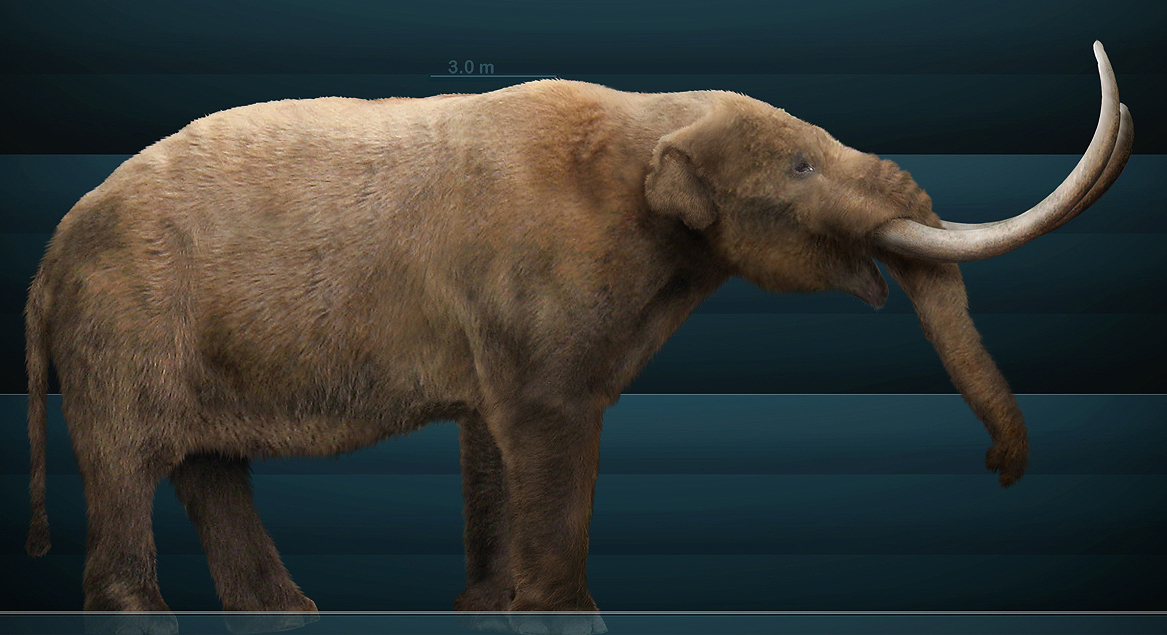
American mastodon restoration

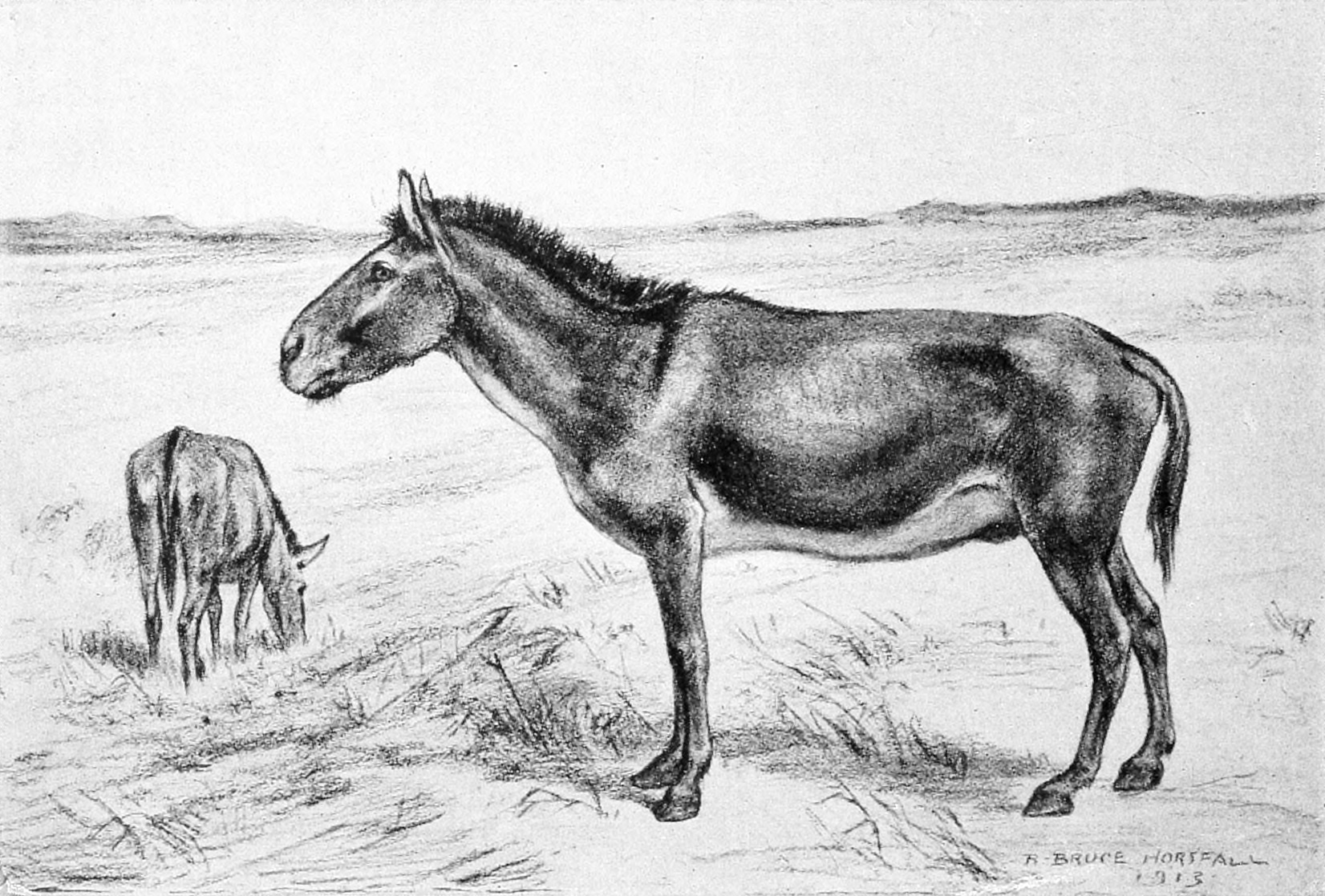
Restoration of Equus scotti, a North American Pleistocene horse

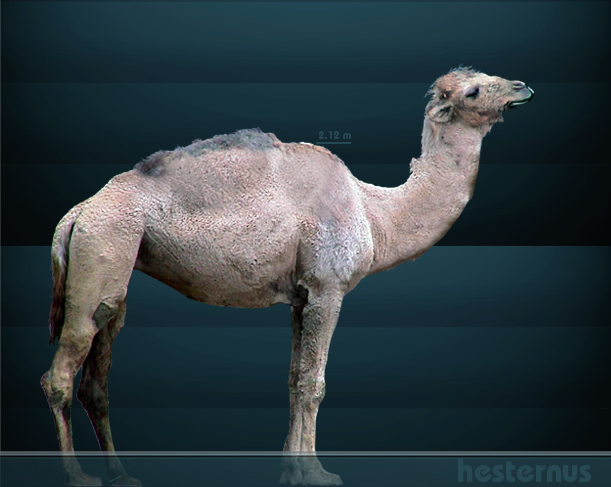
Western camel restoration

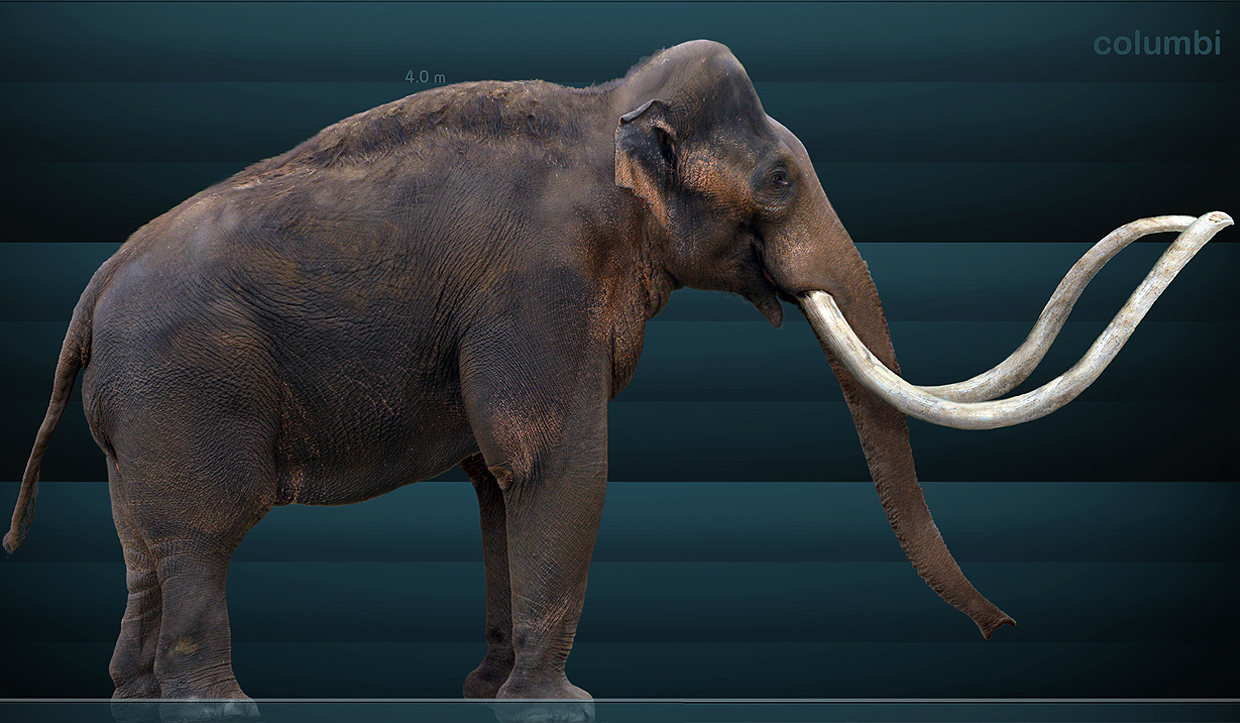
Columbian mammoth restoration

Example	Binomial name	Native range	Anachronism description	Suggested extinct coevolutionary partners
American persimmon	Diospyros virginiana	Southeastern United States	Seeds difficult to separate from the pulp, like in its Old World relatives, and highly toxic unless swallowed whole. Gray foxes, raccoons and American black bears are known seed dispersers, but they were less abundant before their natural predators and competitors like gray wolves, cougars and grizzlies were extirpated by humans, and defecate in certain places in order to mark their territory, limiting their dispersal potential. Virginia opossums consume the pulp but never swallow the seeds. The fruit is edible for a month before it falls from the tree and remains so for several months afterward.	American Mastodon.
Buffalo gourd	Cucurbita foetidissima	Southwestern United States and Mexico	Squash relative with orange-sized fruit that often rots and dries on the ground next to the plant while the next year's fruit is already ripening. The plant grows well in dry uplands, yet is more commonly encountered in floodplains where flash floods provide occasional dispersal; hydrochory was proposed once as the main dispersal syndrome, but this is now rejected. High concentrations of cucurbitacin in the pulp and, to a lesser extent, seeds, makes it bitter to most animals. Domestic cattle and donkeys eat it rarely and mostly as a last resource. If eaten by a cow, the milk will become bitter to humans, and it is deadly to sheep and cattle in enough quantity. In Africa and Asia, such bitter fruit is most commonly eaten by the largest megaherbivores, elephants and rhinoceroses. The distribution is extremely patchy.	Proboscideans, American horses, Toxodon, camelids, and Hesperotestudo.
Cocklebur	Xanthium spp.	Americas and Eastern Asia	One of the best known examples of zoochory that does not involve eating the fruit. In New Mexico, the burs, each containing two seeds, adhere to horse fur with such tenacity that they remain until retrieved by humans or the fur is shed. However, the burs fail to adhere to the fur of the largest wild ungulates in the area, deer.	
Creosote bush	Larrea tridentata	Western United States and Mexico	Was readily eaten by the dromedaries of the United States Camel Corps, a 19th-century experimental unit of the United States Cavalry in Texas and California.	Western camel.
Devil's walkingstick	Aralia spinosa	Southeastern United States	Defensive spines present only in a range that is considerably higher than the current tallest browser in the area, the white-tailed deer.	Columbian mammoth and ground sloths.
Florida nutmeg	Torreya taxifolia	Apalachicola River	Historically reduced to northern Florida's Apalachicola river, which acted as refugium for many temperate trees during the ice ages. Unlike other species, the Florida nutmeg did not expand north when the climate became warmer in the Holocene, and successive blights killed all trees starting in the 1950s. The species survives mostly through asexual reproduction, generating new trees from surviving roots, and it is estimated that it will become extinct when the roots run out of reserves in about 50 years. However, trees introduced to colder, mountain areas in North Carolina thrive and are free of disease, suggesting that the species is better adapted to the current climate there than in Florida's.	The Florida nutmeg might have depended on an unknown large mammal for long range seed dispersal, which became extinct before the ice age ended. Living squirrels are known to provide some dispersal, but this was only enough to ensure the species's survival up to recent times, not its re-expansion north. Because the genus Torreya goes back to the Eocene, it has been suggested that squirrel-like multituberculates dispersed the seeds before squirrels evolved.
Hawthorn	Crataegus spp.	Temperate Northern Hemisphere	Long, widely spaced and insufficiently densed thorns, better at dissuading larger African browsers like rhinoceroses and kudus than the local, narrow-muzzled white-tailed deer.	Ground sloths and American mastodon.
Honey locust	Gleditsia triacanthos	Mississippi River basin	Weather-resistant fruit (pods) that remains on the tree or the ground from one year to another, too large to be eaten by any wild animal in the area, but the seeds need abrasion to germinate. Horses ignore the fruit, but donkeys and mules will eat it on occasion. Large defensive thorns sometimes up to 20 cm are also present, usually high above ground.	Columbian mammoth, American mastodon, American horses, ground sloths, brontotheres, Paraceratherium, and Aepycamelus.
Joshua tree	Yucca brevifolia	Mojave Desert	The fruit is much larger than in related species dispersed by birds and fruit-eating bats, a considerable investment in a desert. Fruit-eating bats are not present in the Mojave, and birds eat parasitic insects living in the Joshua tree's fruit but not the fruit itself. Ground squirrels eat the seeds but only sporadically, and pack rats eat fruit both on the tree and on the ground, but avoid the seeds, not acting as seed dispersers. The fruit is eaten full both by the largest wild mammals in the area (mule deer and bighorn sheep) and livestock including horses, donkeys and cattle, but they can only reach fruit on the ground or the lowest branches, leaving the numerous spines on the rest of the plant unexplained. The fruit may grow at three meters above ground.	The Western camel was 20% larger than the modern dromedary, allowing it to browse up to 4 meters. Although dromedaries have trouble swallowing whole seeds and are very selective eaters and poor seed dispersers as a result, this might have been different in larger Western camels. However, Western camel fossil dung contains only finely chewed plant remains, like in modern camels. The American mastodon, Columbian mammoth and Gomphotherium all lived within the modern range of the Joshua tree and could reach even the tallest branches. Like modern elephants, they are presumed to have had an inefficient digestive system, making them both voracious eaters and perfect seed dispersers. The Shasta ground sloth was common in western North America during the Pleistocene and has been identified as a primary yucca feeder from fossil feces, which are commonly found in desert caves. However, it was only the size of an American black bear and would have been limited to eating only fruit near the ground. It probably fed more often on smaller species of yucca.
Jumping cholla	Cylindropuntia fulgida	Arizona and Sonora	Defensive spines have backward-pointing teeth that attach to passing animals and the stems detach easily. The portions of the stem are transported for a while until they fall to the ground and grow into a new plant. The fruit is also ingested by many desert animals, but it grows above their reach as often as below. Fruit that grows highest may remain in place for months after ripening and fall only after desiccation, when it is not attractive to seed dispersers.	Western camel, Shasta ground sloth, gomphotheres.
Kentucky coffeetree	Gymnocladus dioicus	Midwestern United States	Large range area but very low density. It is more common in floodplains even though it grows upland with no problem. The seeds are the largest of any species in the contiguous United States, but they are not harvested by rodents because they cannot break the pod's walls; they need abrasion to germinate. The pulp is sweet and slightly bitter, similar in taste to the honey locust, but also poisonous to livestock and humans (unless roasted) because of its high content in saponin and alkaloids. The seeds are more poisonous than the pulp, and often, large numbers of fallen pods and non-germinated seeds from preceding years can be found on the ground around a tree, trampled and rotten. The seeds die if they are not removed from the pod in time. Similar, related species in Africa are dispersed by elephants.	American mastodon.
Mesquite	Prosopis spp.	Tamaulipan Mezquital	Sweet and nutritious pods edible to humans and livestock. Horses and cattle act as dispersers and abrade the seeds walls, helping it germinate; foxes and coyotes eat the pods and disperse the seeds but do not abrade them. As a result, the mesquite's range began to expand after European colonization. The rest of the plant is armed with thorns and poisonous to livestock, limits the growth of grass and favors the establishment of nopales. At tree size, it is hard to kill because it will grow back from the root after being knocked down (which is done with tractors). It was sought by the dromedaries of the United States Camel Corps while ignoring the grasses.	Western camel. Gomphotheres were large enough to knock adult trees, like elephants do to similar species in Africa, and might have fed on mesquite pods and prickly pears during the fruiting season.
Mexican ebony	Pithecellobium mexicanum	Sonora, Sinaloa and Baja California Sur	Sweet fruit with hard seeds. Grows mostly in floodplains and stream margins, in natural corridors followed by livestock herds.	
Nopal	Opuntia ficus-indica	Central Mexico	Defensive spines at heights far above the range of current browsers. The whole plant is consumed by camels in North Africa and Australia, where animal and plant alike have been introduced and are now feral, and was sought by the camels of the United States Camel Corps. Camels and other livestock also disperse the seeds.	Western camel and gomphotheres.
Osage orange	Maclura pomifera	East Texas	The orange-sized fruit is eaten in place by mice, rats, rabbits, hares, squirrels (mostly tree squirrels), and deer, but they do not swallow nor store the seeds. It is eaten less discriminately by domestic horses and mules. The defensive branch spines are too wide spaced to dissuade deer-sized ungulates from eating the leaves, making them only effective against larger animals that do not live in the wild in Texas. Fossils from previous interglacials have been found up to southern Canada, suggesting that its range shrank dramatically after its seed dispersal was diminished. Distribution might have been even smaller before the introduction of horses to Texas in the 16th century, even though the wood was favored by many Native American peoples to fashion bows and the local tribes profited greatly from its trade. A close African relative in Gabon is dispersed by forest elephants.	Columbian mammoth, ground sloths, American mastodon, American horses, gomphotheres.
Pawpaw	Asimina triloba	Eastern North America	The species largely reproduces asexually, sprouting patches of small, clonal trees that live around 50 years, from a root system that can live tens of thousands. Its sexual reproduction is elaborate but ineffective. The flower mimics carrion or dung (brown color, fetid odor), but it is rarely visited and pollinated by flies. The downward-facing flower is better suited to be pollinated by beetles, as in related species, all of which live in warmer climates. The fruit is similar in taste and nutritious value to cherimoya and it is the largest edible and the most fleshy in the United States. However, the fruiting season is short and the fruit rots soon after falling from the tree; for this reason pawpaw consumption was abandoned when commercial tropical fruits became available. The seeds are large and encased in a sweet, but slippery aril that is difficult to remove. The distribution is very patchy and it is more abundant in floodplains and where it was cared for by indigenous peoples of the Eastern Woodlands. However, the plant grows with no problem in uplands and humans eat the pulp without swallowing the seeds. The seed dispersal capacity of foxes, raccoons, skunks and American black bears is unclear.	American mastodon. Dung beetles could have been the main pollinators before they became rarer after the extinction of the megafauna.
Red Devil's claw	Proboscidea parviflora	Southwestern United States and northern Mexico	Sticky, repugnant leaves invulnerable to herbivore predation. The fruit divides in two opposite claws when it browns and hardens, the circumference of each being larger than a human leg. Though an obvious zoochoric mechanism, this is far larger than the leg thickness of the largest wild mammals in the area (deer, peccary, coyote), and the seed is mostly dispersed by humans, horses, and cattle. Though already cultivated by Native Americans to make baskets, its range greatly expanded after Europeans introduced livestock, reaching into Louisiana and Iowa by the present day.	
Squash	Cucurbita pepo	Mexico, Texas, and the Eastern United States	Unlike domestic varieties, the wild form is bitter to humans.	Seeds found in association with American mastodon fossils in Florida, including stomach contents.
Taruma	Vitex mollis	Southern Sonora	Sweet fruit with hard seeds. Grows mostly in floodplains and stream margins, in natural corridors followed by livestock herds.	
Yellow tomato Wild tomato	Solanum elaeagnifolium S. carolinense	Western North America and South America; Southeastern United States	Mostly found in disturbed sites and floodplains. Fruit often remains on the branch for months or over a year after ripening, when it is already rotten or desiccated, holding the seeds trapped in its interior. Mammals and birds shun the fruit for its high glycoalkaloid content, which is also lethal to livestock. Reptiles are not affected, and the fruit has features that makes it attractive to turtles (yellow-orange color and right height of fructification), just like other related plants.	The box turtle and gopher tortoise inhabited many areas where wild tomatoes are found, before they went locally extinct. Hesperotestudo.

=== Neotropical realm ===
Extent of the Neotropical realm

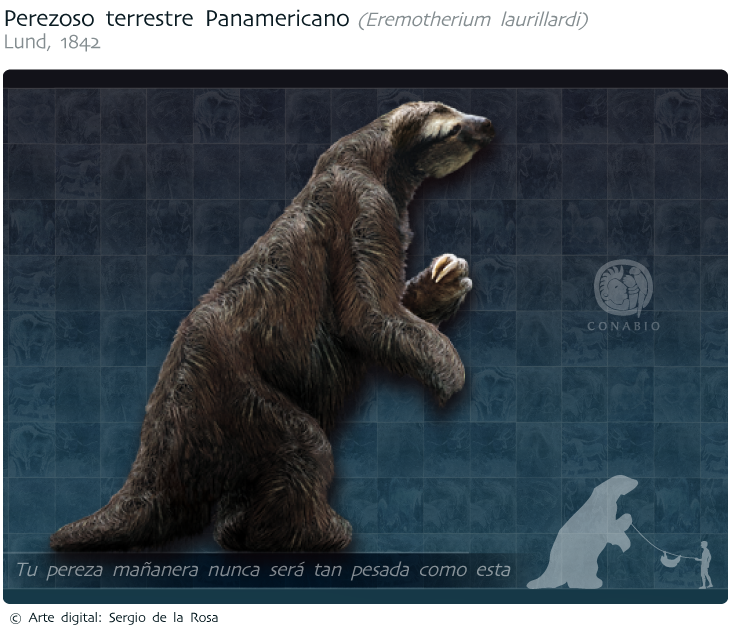
Eremotherium restoration

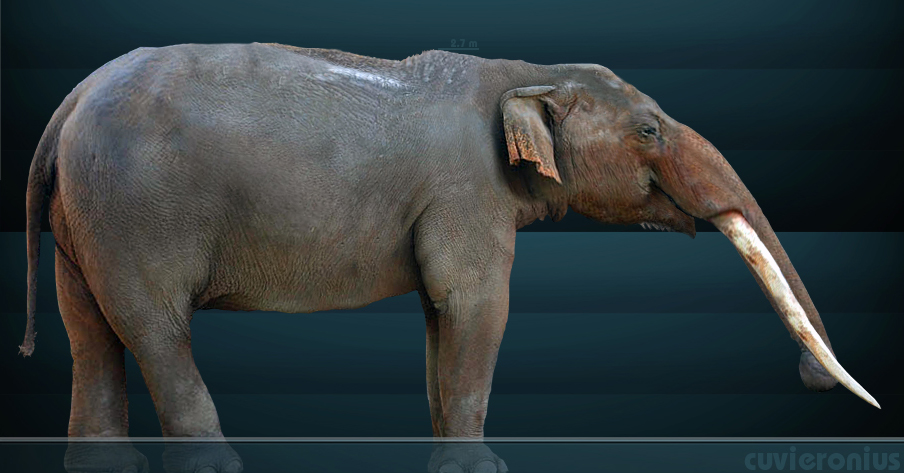
Cuvieronius restoration

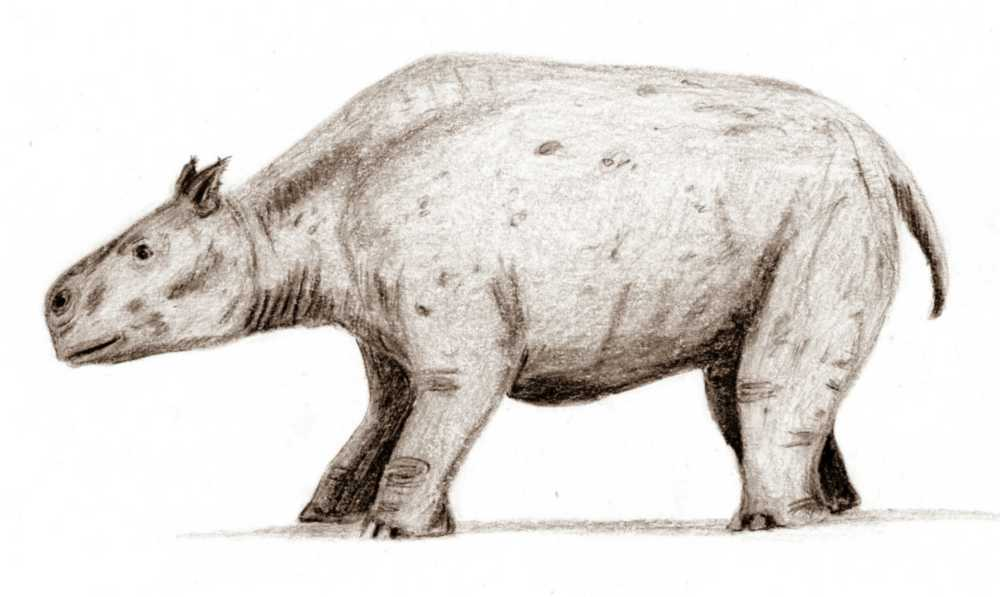
Toxodon restoration

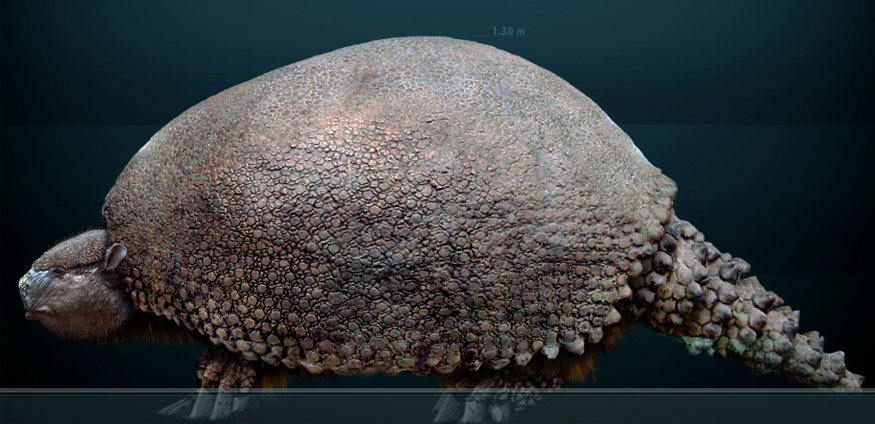
Restoration of Glyptotherium, a glyptodont

Example	Binomial name	Native range	Anachronism description	Suggested extinct coevolutionary partners
	Acacia riparia	Caribbean, Central and South America	Recurved thorns on twigs and leaves.	Ground sloths and gomphotheres.
Cuban belly palm	Acrocomia crispa	Cuba	Large-seeded fruit that takes at least two years to germinate when left on the ground, but only four weeks after being swallowed and dispersed by a captive Galapagos tortoise.	Cuban giant tortoise.
Almendro	Dipteryx oleifera	Honduras to Colombia		Gomphotheres.
American figs	Ficus spp.	Neotropics	Excessive fruit yield, more than bats and spider monkeys can take.	
Angel's trumpets	Brugmansia arborea B. aurea B. insignis B. sanguinea B. suaveolens B. versicolor B. vulcanicola	Tropical Andes and southeastern Brazil	Never observed in the wild, being found only in or near human settlements. Their existence in domestic state only was first noted by Hipólito Ruiz and José Antonio Pavón in the 18th century. Fruit yield is high but no animal species is known to consume it; its high content in tropane alkaloids is not tolerated by pigs, deer, goats, cattle, horses, or camelids, though no studies have been conducted in tapirs. All attempts to germinate seeds artificially have been unsuccessful; the seven known species survive because they were propagated clonally by indigenous peoples and used as a medicinal plant and entheogen, probably for millennia. The related genus Datura is known to cause toxicity in Asian elephants but to be consumed and successfully dispersed by the white rhinoceros.	Browsing ground sloths and gomphotheres.
Ara a gato	Senegalia tenuifolia	California to Bolivia and Brazil, including the Caribbean	Recurved thorns on twigs and leaves.	Ground sloths and gomphotheres.
Avocado	Persea americana	Mesoamerica	Although the pulp is nutritive and eaten by many animals (even carnivores), the seeds are too large to be swallowed. Zoochory is limited to seeds hoarded by agoutis or eaten by jaguars, but they only do occasionally. Relatives in different latitudes have smaller fruit and seeds, and are eaten by vegetarians. The pulp is soft as to not need chewing, but the seeds are poisonous. Forest elephants feed on plantations in Cameroon.	Reaching up to six metres (20 ft) tall, the adults of the giant ground sloth Eremotherium could have gained access to ripe avocados before any other mammal (and juveniles, small enough to climb trees, might have reached higher). The soft, fatty pulp might have made avocados attractive to ground sloths over other fruits, due to their lack of incisors and canines. Cuvieronius, Toxodon, glyptodonts, brontotheres.
Baboonwood	Virola surinamensis	Costa Rica to Brazil and Peru	Fruit typical of those dispersed by birds and monkeys (bright red, dehiscent, with seeds individually coated with fleshy aril), but slightly larger. Its known assemblage of bird and mammal dispersal agents is anomalously small and the fruit is often found rotting on the ground. The plant sprouts better from larger seeds, yet the seeds better dispersed are the smaller ones ingested by birds.	Protopithecus, a distant relative of howler and spider monkeys but twice the size of the largest living New World monkey.
Black calabash	Amphitecna macrophylla	Small patches of Mexico and Guatemala		Gomphotheres.
Black palm	Astrocaryum standleyanum	Nicaragua to Ecuador		Gomphotheres.
Black sapote	Diospyros nigra	Eastern Mexico, the Caribbean, Central America, and Colombia		
Boat-spine acacia	Acacia cochliacantha	Mexico	Extremely thorny at shrub level, almost entirely unarmed at tree level.	
	Bunchosia biocellata	Southeastern Mexico to Nicaragua		
Cabbage tree	Andira inermis	Southern Mexico to Northern South America	Fruit eaten by bats but often found felled under the tree; passed over by domestic pigs, horses, and cattle, possibly due to high antibiotic content in the pulp. The seeds of uneaten fruit are killed by weevil larvae.	Gomphotheres and Toxodon.
Calabash tree	Crescentia cujete	Central and South America	Fruit the size of a soccer ball, with a hard rind tough to crack. The largest living native mammal, Baird's tapir, cannot open its mouth wide enough to bite it. The only animals witnessed feeding on the fruit are domestic horses, which step on top of it and employ as much as two hundred kilograms pressure to open it. The seeds are rubbery and surrounded by slimy black tissue that is both fetid and sweet. The fruit falls to the ground while still green, and ripens after a month on the forest floor.	American horses. Toxodon was a rhinoceros-sized notoungulate with large, unusually oriented incisors whose function is poorly understood. They could have evolved to peel fruits of this type.
Carao	Cassia grandis	Southern Mexico to Venezuela and Ecuador	Hard, cylindrical, half-meter long fruit with an inch and a half diameter, containing large seeds 2 centimeters long, 1.5 cm wide and 0.5 cm thick, embedded in sweet molasses-like pulp. The fruit often remains on the tree long enough for bean weevils and moths to kill the seeds, making it an obvious maladaptation.	Ground sloths and Cuvieronius.
Cedron	Simaba cedron	Colombia and Central America		Gomphotheres.
Ceiba tree	Ceiba aesculifolia C. pentandra C. speciosa	Tropics, mostly in America but also Africa and southeast Asia	Prominent trunk spines (only saplings in C. pentandra's case).	Browsing megafauna.
Central American burs	Aeschynomene spp. Bidens riparia Desmodium spp. Krameria cuspidata Petiveria alliacea Pisonia macrunthocarpa Triumfetta lappula	Central America	Burs stick to the dense hair of horses and cattle, but not to native wild mammals like tapirs, pacas, collared peccaries or white-lipped peccaries. Excluding Pisonia and Krameria, all are herbaceous species that occur on open, well-trampled habitats.	Gomphotheres, Toxodon, and ground sloths.
Cherimoya Custard apple and relatives	Annona cherimola A. reticulata A. muricata A. squamosa A. purpurea A. holosericea A. reticulata Sapranthus palanga	Neotropics		Cuvieronius.
Chilean mesquite	Prosopis chilensis	Peru, eastern Argentina and central Chile	Sweet fruit with hard seeds. Grows mostly in floodplains and stream margins, in natural corridors followed by livestock herds.	
Christ's Crown of Thorns	Gleditsia amorphoides	Argentina	Defensive trunk spines up to forty centimeters long.	American horses and proboscideans.
Cocoa trees	Theobroma spp.	Central and South America		Gomphotheres.
Divi-divi	Caesalpina coriacea	Caribbean, Mexico, Central and Northern South America		
Dyer's mulberry	Maclura tinctoria	Mexico to Argentina	Saplings with trunk spines.	Browsing megafauna.
Genipapo	Genipa americana	Southern Mexico to Peru		
Grangel	Randia echinocarpa	Mexico	Sweet fruit with hard seeds. Grows mostly in floodplains and stream margins, in natural corridors followed by livestock herds.	
Grugru	Acrocomia aculeata	Southern Mexico and the Caribbean to Paraguay and northern Argentina	Large fruit and seeds, with tough epicarp, sticky pulp, and hard endocarp. The fruit grows at heights suitable for terrestrial mammals, but it is often found felled under the tree, uneaten, and accompanied by older, ungerminated seeds. Young trees are heliophilous, requiring the clearing of older trees to grow. Cattle ingest the fruit, dispersing the seeds when they regurgitate them during rumination, and help the establishment of new plants through trampling of older vegetation. Long trunk and leaf spines ill-suited to dissuade smaller predators like rodents.	Browsing megafauna.
Guanacaste tree	Enterolobium cyclocarpum	Central Mexico to northern Brazil and Venezuela	The flowers grow rapidly into large, fleshy, ear-shaped pods during the dry season of the year after fertilization. The ripe pods are brown and cacao-flavored, and fall to the ground over the space of a month. Though many wild animals eat the pods' flesh, only tapirs are large enough to swallow and disperse the seeds. The pods are eaten and dispersed with ease by domestic horses and cattle, making trees common in pastures or near them.	American horses, gomphotheres, glyptodonts, ground sloths, Columbian mammoths, and toxodonts.
Guapinol	Hymenaea courbaril	Caribbean, Central and South America	Thick woody pod with dry sugary pulp and dark color. Though with obvious signs of megafaunal dispersal syndrome, the seeds are dispersed almost exclusively by a seed-hoarding rodent, the agouti.	Gomphotheres.
Guatemalan zizfum	Ziziphus guatemalensis	Chiapas to Costa Rica		
Guayabillo	Chloroleucon mangense	Central, Northern South America and the Caribbean	Sweet fruit with hard seeds. Grows mostly in floodplains and stream margins, in natural corridors followed by livestock herds.	
Ixtle	Aechmea magdalenae	Southern Mexico to Ecuador		Gomphotheres
	Jacquinia pungens	Southern Mexico to Costa Rica	Leaves grow needle-sharp tips only during the dry season. Spines best developed within four to six meters of the ground.	Ground sloths and gomphotheres.
Locust bean	Parkia pendula	Honduras to Bolivia and Brazil		Gomphotheres.
Manchineel	Hippomane mancinella	Southern North America and Northern South America	Small seeds imbedded in a hard core.	
Maya nut	Brosimum alicastrum	Yucatan and Guatemala to the Amazon		
Mexican calabash	Crescentia alata	Mesoamerica and Central America	White, orange-sized fruit. Unless mechanically broken, the seeds die either from desiccation (in a dry environment) or when the pulp ferments (in moist). The fruit is often consumed by free-ranging horses, and the tree's size (3–4 meters tall) and shape is similar to African trees dispersed by megafauna.	Fossils of the native horse Amerhippus have been found in the plant's range area.
Mimosa	Mimosa eurycarpa M. guanacastensis	Central and South America	Recurved thorns in twigs and leaves.	Ground sloths and gomphotheres.
Monkeypod	Pithecellobium dulce	Pacific coast of Mexico, Central and northern South America	Sweet fruit with hard seeds. Grows mostly in floodplains and stream margins, in natural corridors followed by livestock herds.	
Nance	Byrsonima crassifolia	Central Mexico to Bolivia and Brazil, including the Caribbean		
Nicaragua persimmon	Diospyros nicaraguensis	Eastern Yucatan, southern Nicaragua and northern Costa Rica	Large fruit production that rots on the ground.	
Forest palm	Attalea rostrata	Central America	Large fruit and seeds, with tough epicarp, sticky pulp and hard endocarp. The fruit grows at heights suitable for terrestrial mammals, but it is often found felled under the tree, uneaten, and accompanied by older, ungerminated seeds. Young trees are heliophilous, requiring the clearing of older trees to grow. Cattle ingest the fruit, dispersing the seeds when they regurgitate them during rumination, and also help the establishment of new plants through trampling of older vegetation.	Cuvieronius.
Jobo	Spondias mombin S. purpurea S. radlkoferi	Neotropics	Excessive fruit crop with small seeds imbedded in a hard core.	
Ojo de Buey	Dioclea megacarpa	Western Nicaragua		
Papaya	Carica papaya	Central and northern South America	The wild form measures about ten centimeters. The pulp is soft and does not require chewing, but the seeds are poisonous. Seeds small but clustered at the center, with a pungent, peppery taste. Forest elephants feed on plantations in Cameroon.	Cuvieronius, ground sloths, and Toxodon.
Peine de mico	Apeiba tibourbou	Caatinga, Cerrado and Costa Rica		
Piñuela	Bromelia karatas B. pinguin	Sinaloa to Brazil		
Pochote	Pachira quinata	Costa Rica to Colombia and Venezuela	Prominent trunk spines, especially in younger trees.	Browsing megafauna.
Pouteria tree	Pouteria spp.	Neotropics		Gomphotheres.
Pupunha	Bactris guineensis B. major	Mexico to Colombia, Venezuela and Trinidad	Large fruit and seeds, with tough epicarp, sticky pulp and hard endocarp. The fruit grows at heights suitable for terrestrial mammals, but it is often found felled under the tree, uneaten, and accompanied by older, ungerminated seeds. Young trees are heliophilous, requiring the clearing of older trees to grow. Cattle ingest the fruit, dispersing the seeds when they regurgitate them during rumination, and also help the establishment of new plants through trampling of older vegetation. Long leaf spines ill-suited to dissuade smaller predators like rodents.	
Purui	Alibertia edulis	Caribbean coast of Central America		
Rain tree	Albizia saman	Mexico to Peru and Brazil	Fruit eaten by domestic horses and cattle.	
Sachamango	Gustavia superba	Central and Northwestern South America		
Sali	Tetragastris panamensis	Guatemala to Bolivia and Brazil	Fruit very similar to Baboonwood. Seed waste deemed "enormous" and known dispersal agents "inefficient".	Protopithecus.
Sandbox tree	Hura crepitans	Tropical North and South America	Prominent trunk spines, especially in young trees.	Browsing megafauna.
Sapodilla	Manilkara zapota	Mexico, Central America and the Caribbean		
Shinglewood	Nectandra hihua	Mexico and Florida to Brazil	Sweet fruit with hard seeds. Grows mostly in floodplains and stream margins, in natural corridors followed by livestock herds.	
	Sphinga platyloba	Central America	Recurved thorns on twigs and leaves.	Ground sloths and gomphotheres.
Sweet acacia	Vachellia farnesiana	Mexico and Central America	Fruit sought by domestic cattle and horses.	
Tempisque	Sideroxylon capiri	Mesoamerica and the West Indies		
Velvetseed	Guettarda macrosperma	Chiapas to Costa Rica		
West Indian elm	Guazuma ulmifolia	Neotropics	Sweet fruit with hard seeds eaten by domestic horses and cattle. Grows mostly in floodplains and stream margins, in natural corridors followed by livestock herds. The pulp has woody obstacles that prevent mastication.	
White bayahonda	Prosopis juliflora	Mexico, South America and the Caribbean	Very localized and patchy distribution along margins of mangrove swamps and beaches. Ingested by cattle and horses.	
	Zamia spp.	Mexico to Bolivia, including the West Indies		Gomphotheres.
	Zanthoxylum setulosum	Costa Rica to Colombia and Venezuela	Prominent trunk spines, especially in young trees.	Browsing megafauna.

=== Oceanian realm ===
All ecoregions within the Oceanian realm

Turtle-jawed moa-nalo restoration

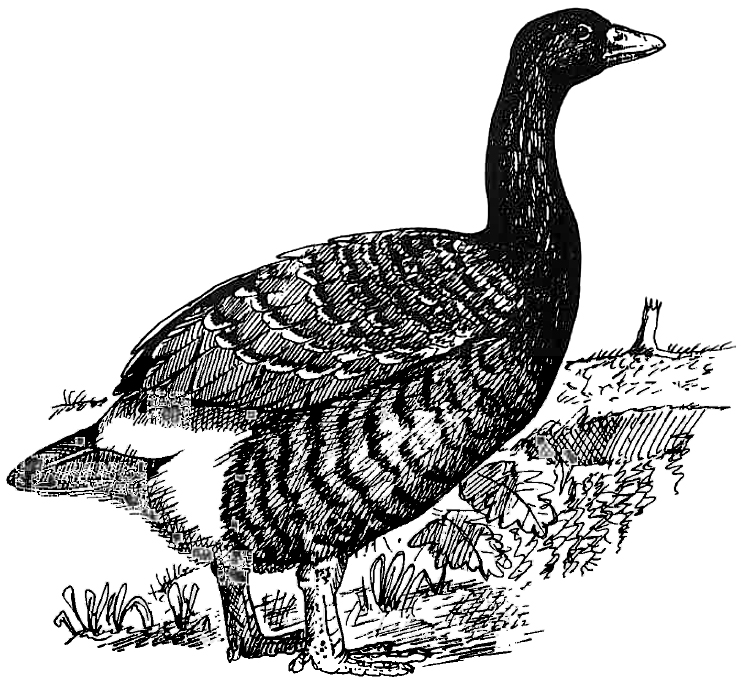
Giant Hawaii goose restoration

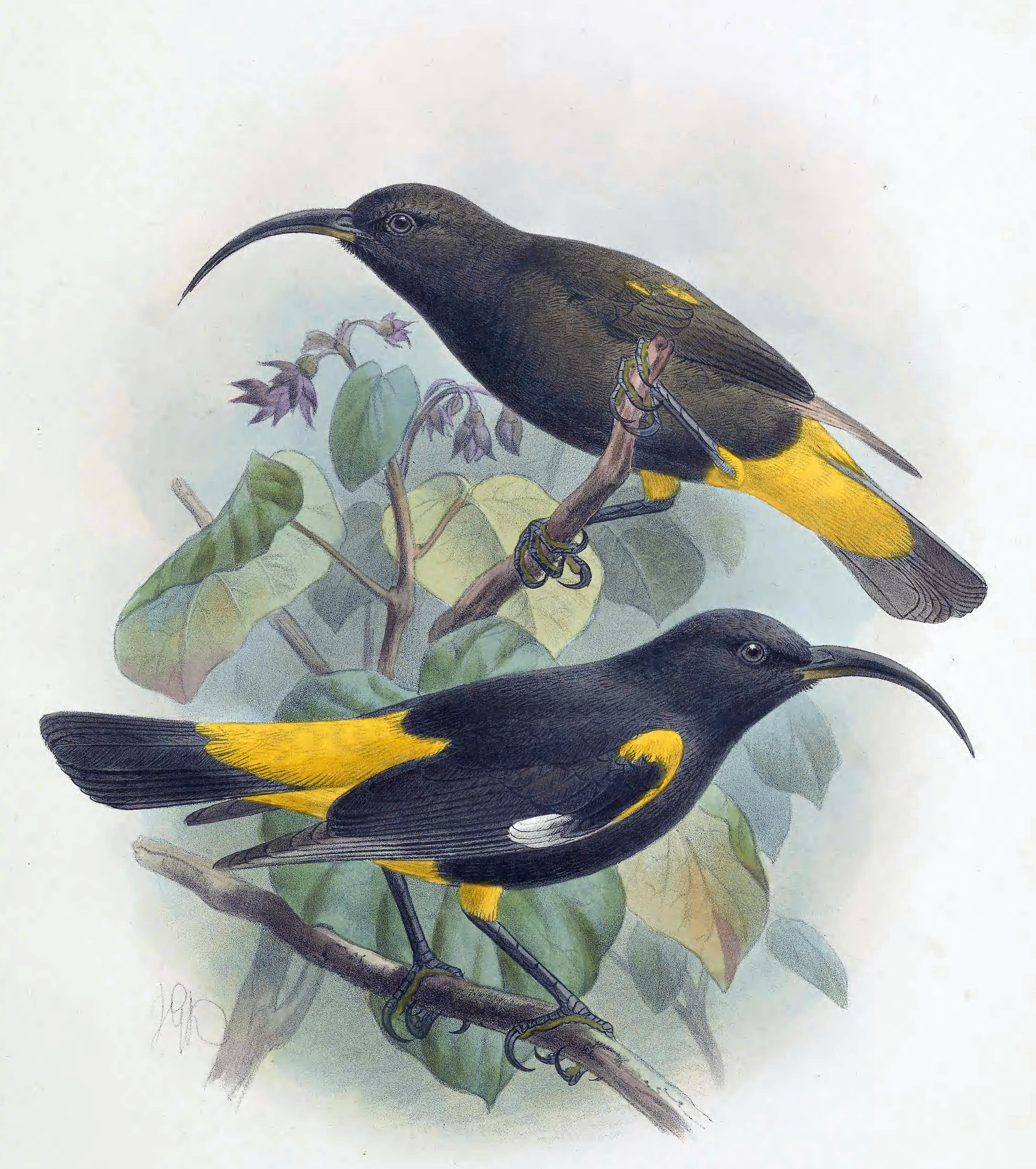
Live depiction of Hawaii mamo (1893)

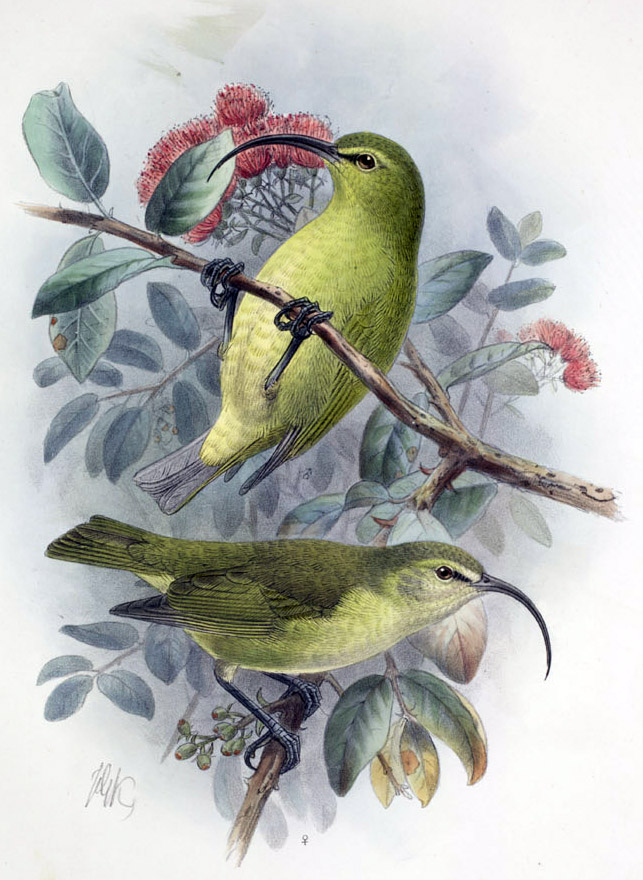
Live depiction of lesser ʻakialoa (1893-1900)

Example	Binomial name	Native range	Anachronism description	Suggested extinct coevolutionary partners
Fiji trees	Burkella, Callophyllum, Heritiera, Myristica, Sterculia, Sukunia, Terminalia, Xylocarpus spp.	Fiji	Native trees with hard seeds that cannot be cracked by extant local birds and bats.	Noble megapode, a large pangalliform with a specialized high bill convergent with Gastornithids and Dromornithids.
Hawaiian lobelioids	Cyanea spp.	Hawaii	Spines or thorns on the stem and leaves, most pronounced in younger plants, despite no living native browsing animals being present.	Moa-nalo and giant Hawaii goose.
Mountain hibiscus	Hibiscadelphus spp.	Hawaii	Eight extinct or endangered species of Hibiscus relatives with evident ornithophilous pollination syndrome, as the flowers produce copious amounts of nectar but remain folded in a tube that make it only accessible to a few bird species.	"Remarkable similarity" between the flower's corolla and the bill curvature of recently extinct Hawaii mamo and lesser ʻakialoa.

=== Palearctic realm ===
Extent of the Palearctic biogeographical realm

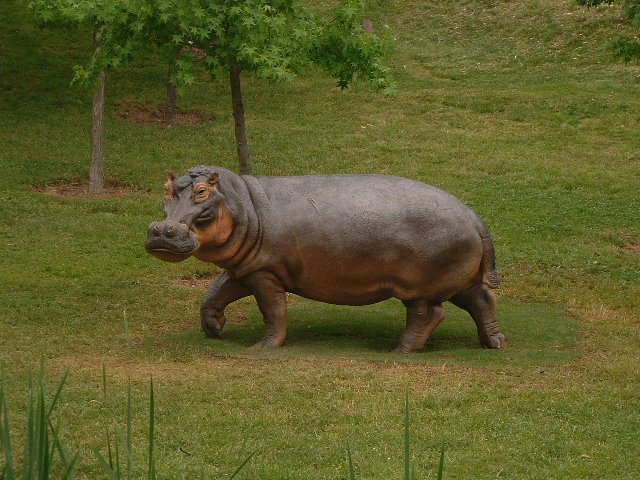
Restoration of Hippopotamus gorgops

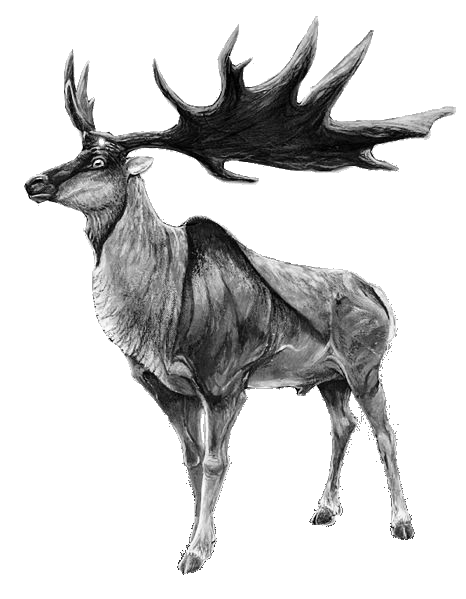
Megaloceros restoration

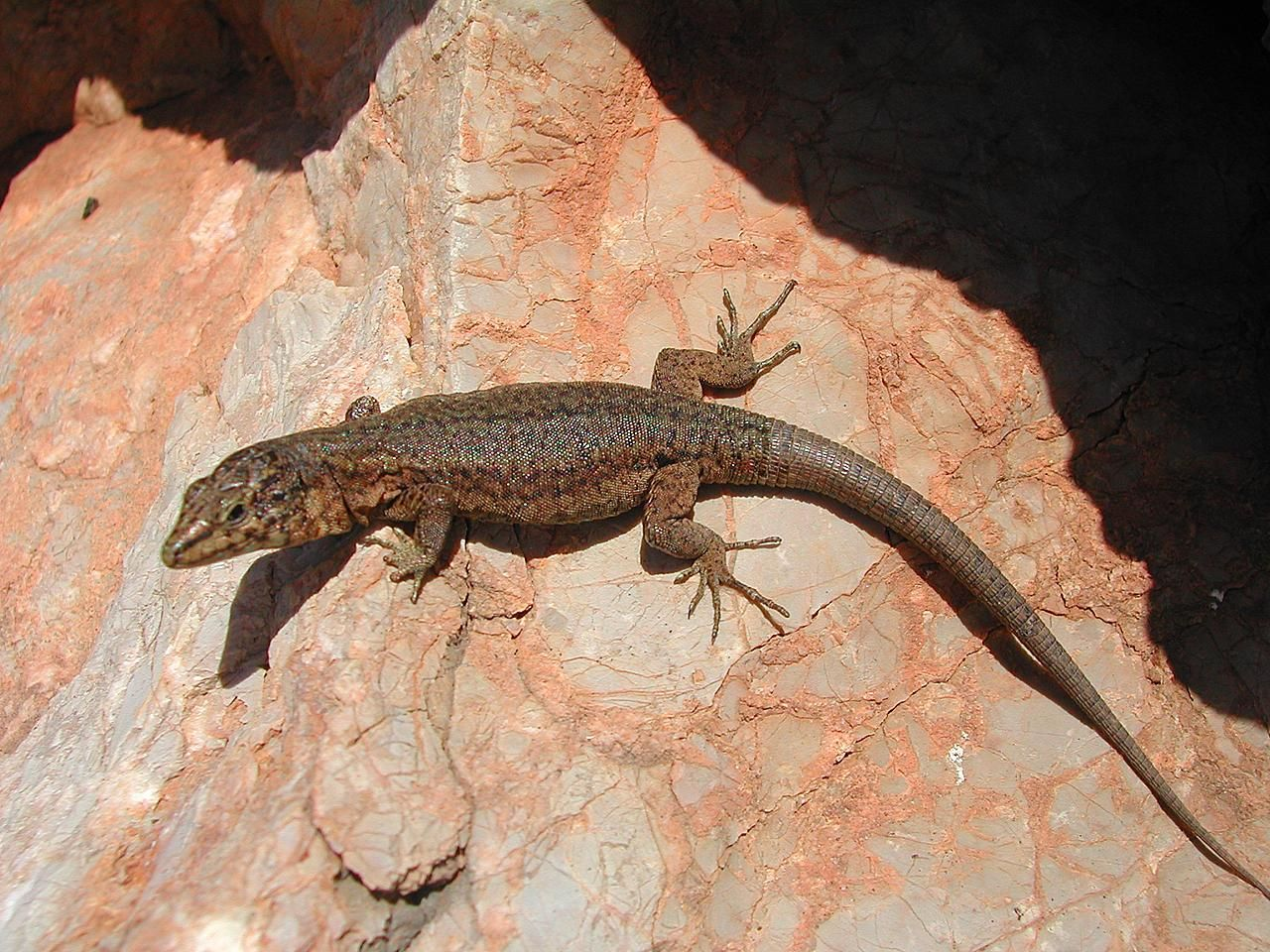
Lilford's wall lizard

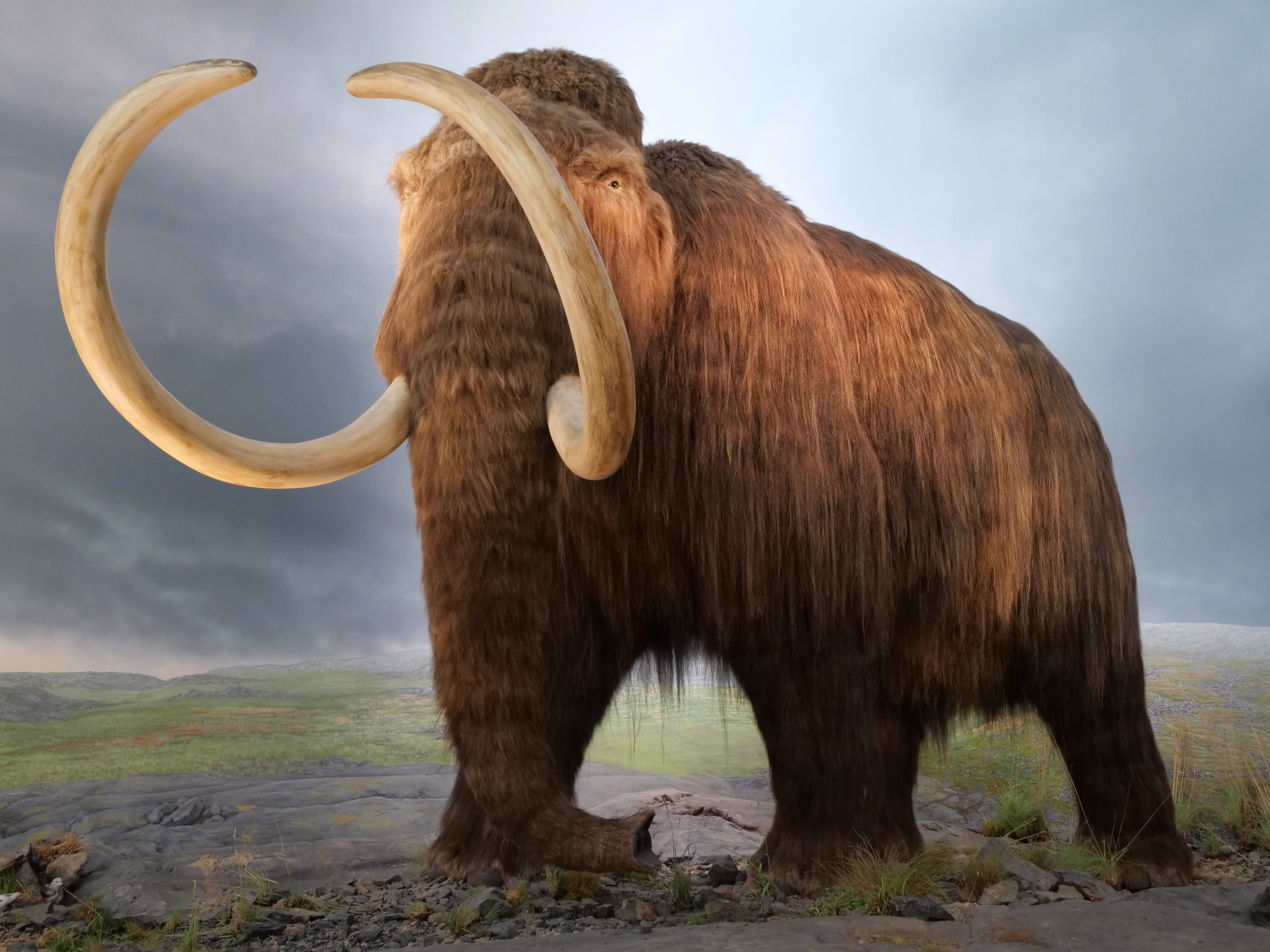
Woolly mammoth restoration

Example	Binomial name	Native range	Anachronism description	Suggested extinct coevolutionary partners
Carob	Ceratonia siliqua	Mediterranean coast	A relative of Gymnocladus and Gleditsia with a hard seed coat that is impenetrable to water. Seeds are viable after passing through an animal's digestive tract, but require treatment with acid or hot water to encourage artificial germination. Ingestion by cattle and foxes was shown not to enhance germination, but ingestion by sheep and goats did. Similar, related species are dispersed by megafaunal animals or thought to have evolved alongside now-extinct megafauna which they presumably benefited from.	The fruit is eaten and the seeds are known to be dispersed to some degree by mammals in its native range, including cattle, wild boar, goats, sheep, foxes and, in Israel, Egyptian fruit bats (Rousettus aegyptiacus), however, comparison with similar leguminous fruits suggests elephants as the erstwhile primary disperser.
Large-fruited Malinae	Cormus domestica, Crataegus germanica, Malus species, Pyrus species	Europe and Western Asia, Atlas Mountains	The fruits are large (around 2 cm in diameter), dull in colour but distinctive in scent, with a comparably hard flesh or skin, and fall to the ground when ripe. Native mammalian dispersers, such as deer and wild boar, are likely ineffective. Nowadays, these species are endangered, and disappear from forests. On the other hand, they regenerate and persist in grazed woodlands.	Aurochs and wild horse.
Common hazel	Corylus avellana	Europe and Western Asia	Inability to regenerate in either the deep shade of a forest canopy or under heavy browsing in the open. Though some Eurasian megafauna capable of clearing forests survived into the Holocene (red deer, aurochs, tarpan, wisent, Eurasian beaver and wild boar), differences in the composition of pollen records between the earliest Holocene previous to large human-induced clearing and the interglacial MIS 5 suggests that further clearing was done by even larger megaherbivores that disappeared in the Late Pleistocene.	Hippopotamus, straight-tusked elephant, and narrow-nosed rhinoceros.
Common juniper	Juniperus communis	Northern Hemisphere	Reduction of fossil pollen concentration in Ireland and subsequent increase unrelated to climate change.	The giant deer Megaloceros colonized Ireland right around the time juniper numbers went down and became extinct when they went up. Megaloceros browsed juniper and other shrubs because of their high phosphorus content, which it needed to grow antlers for the mating season. This predation caused in turn the descent of juniper and its replacement by grasses.
	Daphne rodriguezii	Menorca	Endemic shrub in geographical and genetic decline due to the lack of seed dispersal on the island. Most plants grow in the vicinity of their parents causing inbreeding.	Lilford's wall lizard was widespread in Mallorca and Menorca before Roman colonization, when it was wiped out by introduced mammalian predators. It survives in uninhabited islets around both islands and is the only animal observed ingesting the fruit and dropping the seeds in places suitable for plant establishment.
European holly	Ilex aquifolium	Europe and North Africa	Leaves with defensive spiny edges up to four or five meters over the ground, when they are replaced by smooth leaves. This is more than twice the reach of the current largest browsers in the area, the red deer and the wisent.	
Mammoth steppe	Several unrelated species	Altai-Sayan Mountains	Dry but botanically diverse biome, consisting of grasses, forbs and sedges, which occupied most of northern Eurasia and North America during the Pleistocene and was associated with high concentrations of large grazers. Starting about 13,000 years ago, the steppe was replaced by wet moss and shrub tundra, taiga and deciduous forests with reduced plant diversity. The change has been traditionally attributed to a climatic shift to warmer, wetter, less continental conditions in the transition to the Holocene, and in turn used to explain the extinction of the megafauna. Sergey Zimov proposed the opposite: That the extinction of the megafauna caused the change in vegetation, and that this would not have happened if the megafauna survived, as was the case in previous interglacials.	Woolly mammoth, muskox, steppe bison, and wild horse.
Mediterranean dwarf palm	Chamaerops humilis	Southwest Mediterranean	Successful seed dispersal by introduced feral goats and European pine martens in the Balearic Islands.	Balearic cave goat.
Oak	Quercus robur Q. petraea	Europe and Western Asia	Inability to regenerate in either the deep shade of a forest canopy or under heavy browsing in the open. Though some megafauna capable of clearing forests survived into the Holocene, differences in the composition of pollen records between the earliest Holocene and the MIS 5 suggests that further clearing was done by larger megaherbivores in the Pleistocene. Furthermore, oak is often positively associated with thorny shrub, benefiting from associational resistance. The oak sapling profits from the thorn protecting the shrub, but also from sufficient light availability in contrast to closed forest.	Hippopotamus, straight-tusked elephant, and narrow-nosed rhinoceros.

== Proposed examples in animals ==
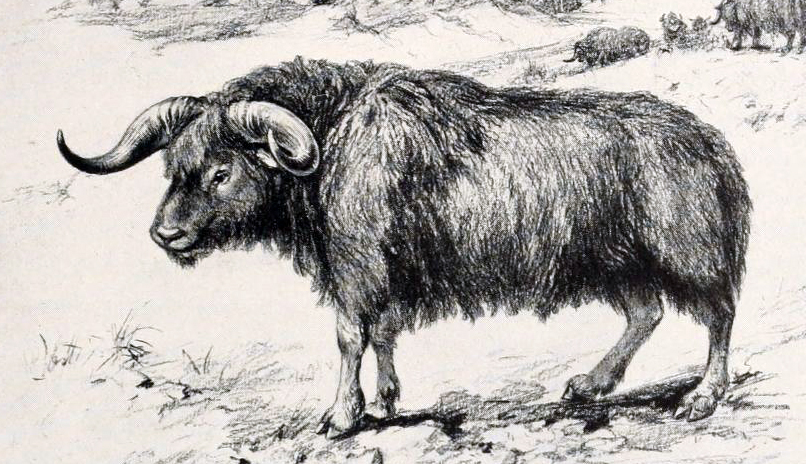
Shrub-ox restoration

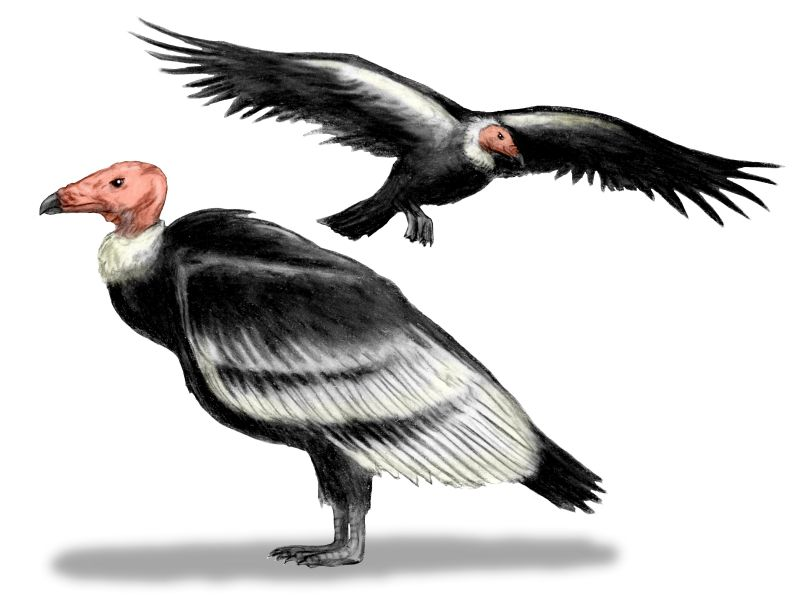
Teratornis restoration

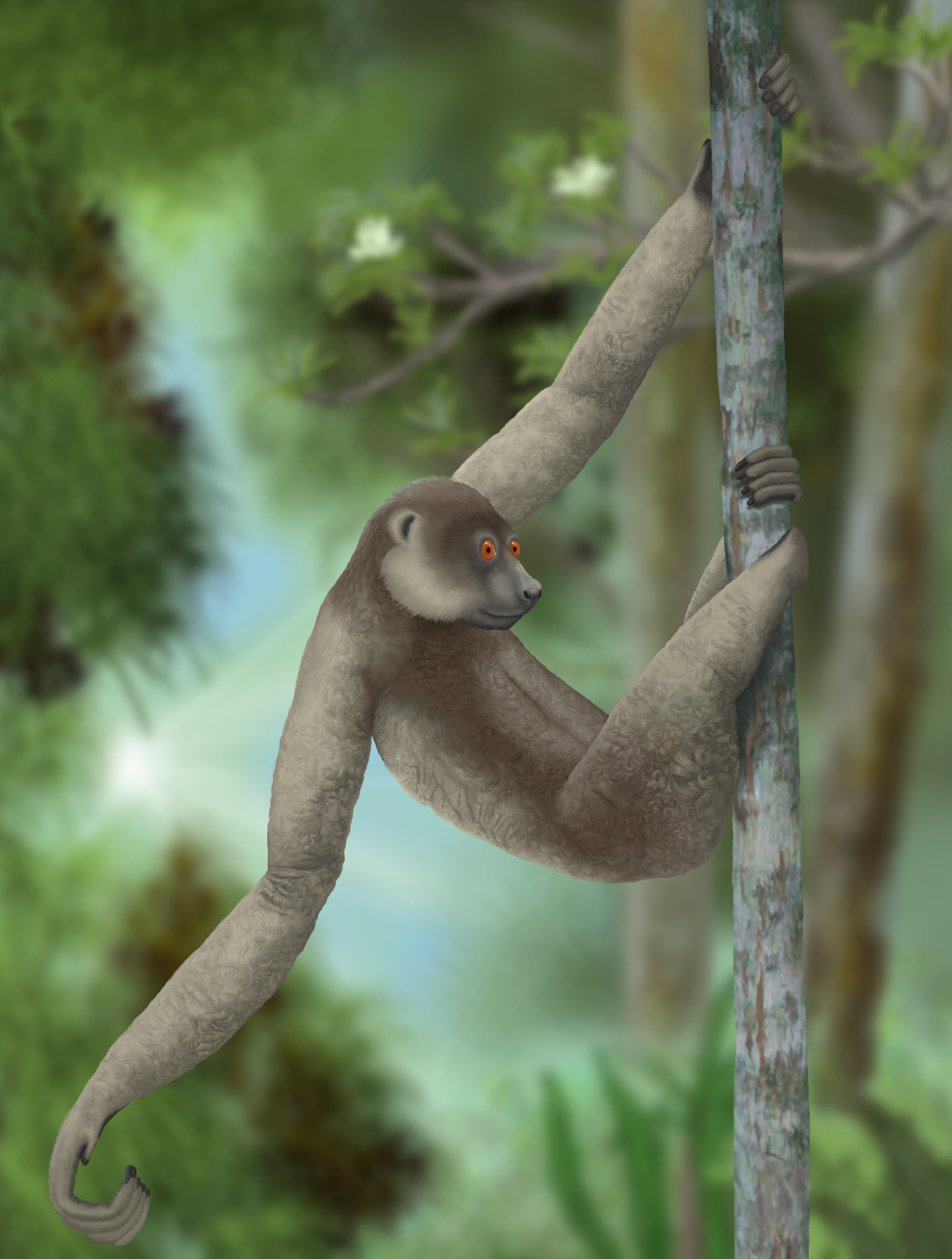
Restoration of Palaeopropithecus, a sloth lemur

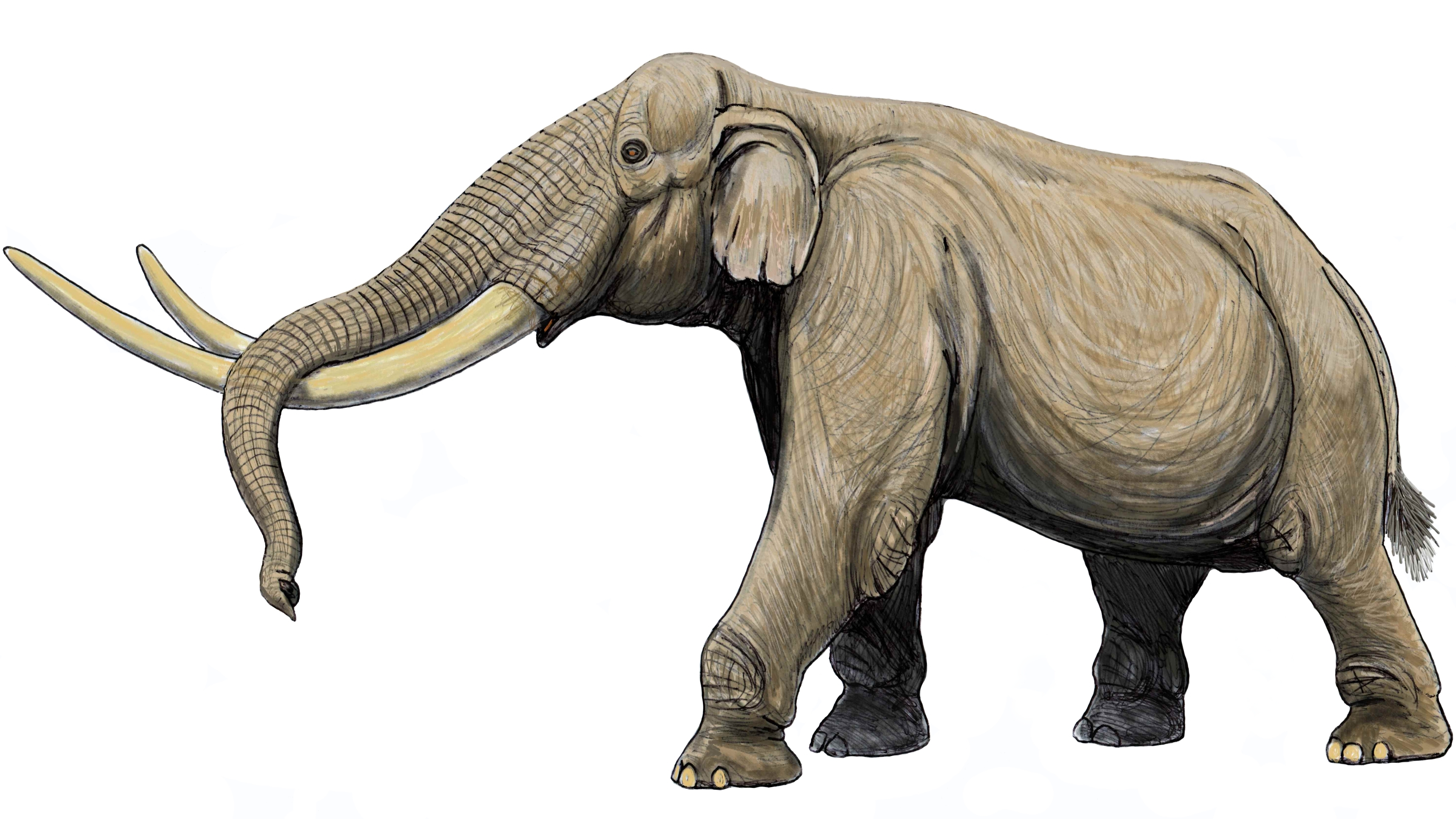
Stegodon restoration

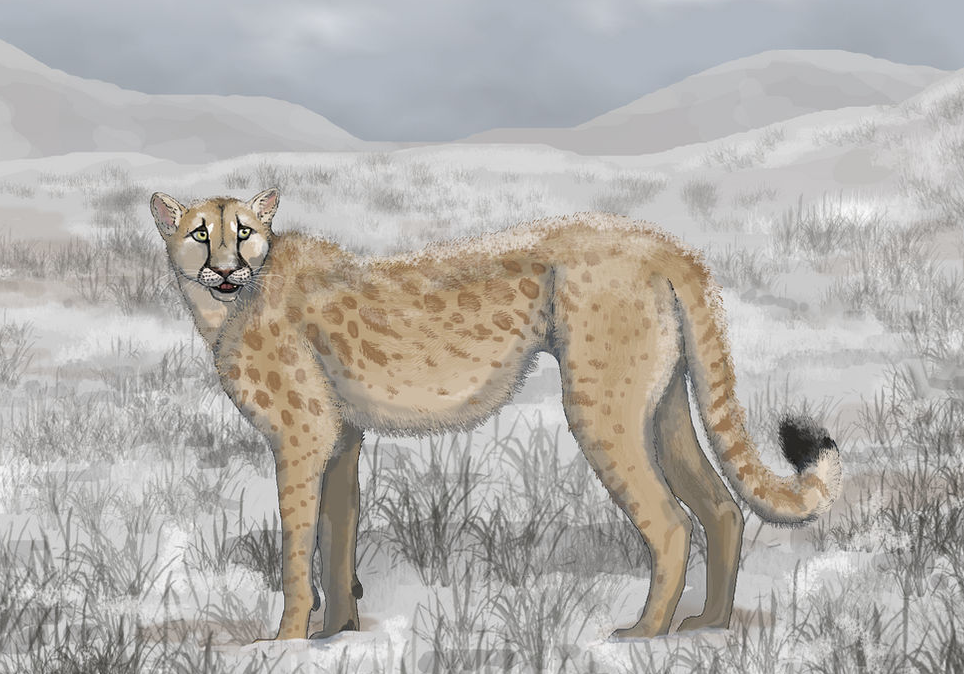
American cheetah restoration

Example	Binomial name	Native range	Anachronism description	Suggested extinct coevolutionary partners
Australian bush fly	Musca vetustissima	Australia	Native dung fly dependent on domestic cattle, and before cattle was introduced, on human dung. The flies ignore kangaroo dung because it is drier and not as abundant.	Australian megafauna.
Brown-headed cowbird	Molothrus ater	North America	Flocks follow horse and cattle herds, feeding on insects stirred up by trampling. Their numbers and eastern range expanded greatly after livestock was introduced by Europeans; however, fossils evidence that they were just as numerous or more in the Pleistocene, and also that there were two other species in North America that disappeared during the transition to the Holocene.	American bison, Harlan's muskox, shrub-ox, American horses, North American llama, Western camel, Columbian mammoth, American mastodon.
California condor	Gymnogyps californianus	Western North America	Critically endangered, the condor survives in a few areas near the Pacific coast. However, the same species was present in most of North America before the human settlement of the Americas, and a close relative was found in Cuba. It benefited from the introduction of livestock by Europeans, incorporating horse, cattle, and sheep into its diet, and even expanded its Holocene range before human-induced habitat loss, lead and DDT poisoning, and poaching drove it to near extinction by 1987. Cattle bones were the most commonly found in condor nests by 2000.	Remains of bison, Western camel, horse, Columbian mammoth, and Harrington's mountain goat were found in Pleistocene and early Holocene nests of the Grand Canyon. It was suggested that condors survived near the Pacific by feeding on salmon, beached whales, elephant seal and mule deer carcasses, which have skin soft enough to be pierced by the condor's weak beak. Elsewhere, the condor would have fed on terrestrial megafauna, but only after larger carrion birds like Teratornis had pierced the tougher furry skin, mirroring the symbiotic relationship between African white-backed vultures and the larger lappet-faced vultures and white-headed vultures.
Cape Verde giant skink	Chioninia coctei	Ilhéu Branco and Ilhéu Raso, Cape Verde	Discovered in 1873 living among, and feeding on seabird colonies in small, rocky islets denuded of vegetation. However, the species was noted to have a powerful prehensile tail, long fingers typical of skinks that live in the lower canopy, vegetarian dentition, and favored vegetation and fruit while in captivity. The lower eyelid had a unique transparent "window" that allowed animals to receive information from below while asleep.	Subfossil remains and historical records indicate that the species was also present until recently in São Vicente and Santa Luzia islands, and that all were united into a single, more forested island during the Pleistocene. The "window" could be an adaptation against predators striking from below while the crepuscular skink slept on branches during the day. This was ineffective against the only known natural predator in modern times, the barn owl.
Cuban crocodile	Crocodylus rhombifer	Cuba's Zapata Swamp and Isle of Youth	Critically endangered species that was once widespread through Cuba, the Cayman Islands, and the Bahamas. One of the smallest crocodiles but also among the most terrestrial and intelligent; observations in captivity revealed previously unknown pack-hunting behavior, which would make it capable of taking down animals larger than those found in the Caribbean.	Six species of Caribbean ground sloths, the largest of which was the size of an American black bear.
Fossa	Cryptoprocta ferox	Lowland Madagascar	Though normally solitary, adult males were observed banding together and cooperating to hunt sifaka, a tree-dwelling lemur smaller than a fossa, and thus unable to feed the group.	The behavior could have evolved to hunt larger arboreal lemurs like the extinct sloth lemurs, though alternative explanations have been offered.
	Helictopleurus giganteus	Eastern Madagascar	The largest and rarest of Madagascar dung beetles, apparently entirely dependent on human feces. Yet humans arrived for the first time only 2000 years ago.	Giant lemurs.
Hyacinth macaw Indigo macaw	Anodorhynchus hyacinthinus A. leari	South America	Both species follow cattle in Brazil (mostly zebu-crossed Brahman, which are bigger fruit eaters) and extract partially digested seeds from their dung. They have adaptations to terrestrial locomotion not present in other macaws, and they ignore the same fruit while on the tree, even ripe, suggesting that this behavior is an ancient adaptation rather than recently learned. Grey parrots do the same with dung of African forest elephants.	Cuvieronius.
Komodo dragon	Varanus komodensis	Flores and other Indonesian islands, such as Komodo	Though an endemic species, it survives largely by hunting or scavenging artiodactyls like Javan rusa, banded pig, and water buffalo, all of which were introduced by humans.	Stegodon florensis, a dwarf proboscidean of similar size to bovines, horses, and large pigs. More recently, it was suggested that the Komodo dragon's ancestors evolved their size in northern Australia and spread north to colonize Indonesia. This would make the Komodo dragon a double anachronism, as they would have originally preyed on giant marsupials like Diprotodon. Pigs, cattle, deer, camels, horses, and buffaloes were later introduced to Australia, where they have no predators and are overpopulated; it was suggested to introduce Komodo dragons as a natural predator to control their population
	Merobruchus columbinus	Central America and the Caribbean	Bean weevil parasiting the fruit of Albizia saman. The animals leave the fruit just before the fall, even though it is still nutritive.	The rapid exit could be an adaptation to avoid accidental ingestion by large mammals now extinct.
Père David's deer	Elaphurus davidianus	Northeastern China	Although the species became extinct in the wild over one thousand years ago, the animals become cautious when exposed to images or recordings of tigers. Exposition to other animals does not elicit the same response or not as strong.	Siberian tiger
Pronghorn	Antilocapra americana	Western North America	Capable of sustaining speeds of 60 miles per hour, making it the second fastest land animal in the world after the cheetah, and the fastest long-endurance runner. No predator in its range approaches this speed. Cougars are the only regular predators of adult pronghorns, but can only hunt them when the terrain allows for a stealthy approach. Wolves and coyotes may prey on the young but are poorly suited to hunt adults. American black bears have been observed attempting ambushes on occasion, but typically unsuccessfully. The leg muscles are so overbuilt towards sustained speed that pronghorns cannot jump and will try to cross fences by going under rather than above.	Both the giant short-faced bear and the American lion were larger and better built for sustained speed than their living relatives, the spectacled bear and the lion, respectively. The jaguar was present in large areas of the United States during the Pleistocene and might have hunted pronghorns by stealth, just like the cougar. The extinct American cheetahs (Miracinonyx inexpectatus and particularly M. trumani) were explosive runners very similar to the living cheetah, though not closely related to it. If they could reach the same speed (70 mph), they would have been the most successful predators of pronghorns in short distances, and also explain the pronghorn's evolution towards sustained running, since modern cheetahs cannot keep running for long. Chasmaporthetes, the only hyena that ever colonized North America successfully, had cheetah-like proportions and was better built for speed than its living relatives.
Ring-tailed lemur Sifakas	Lemur catta Propithecus diadema P. verreauxi	Madagascar	The adults practice measures against predation by birds of prey, even though they are too large to be hunted by the birds of the island.	Malagasy crowned eagle, a relative of the African crowned eagle extinct since c. 1500 AD, and another extinct Malagasy eagle of the genus Aquila.

== Criticism ==
Some of the popular examples of this phenomenon lack hard scientific evidence of actually being anachronisms, and have evidence in the other direction, such as many palms which are effectively spread by parrots, and osage oranges which are unpalatable to all living animals and which don't germinate well after being eaten by elephants or at all after being eaten by horses.

== In popular culture ==
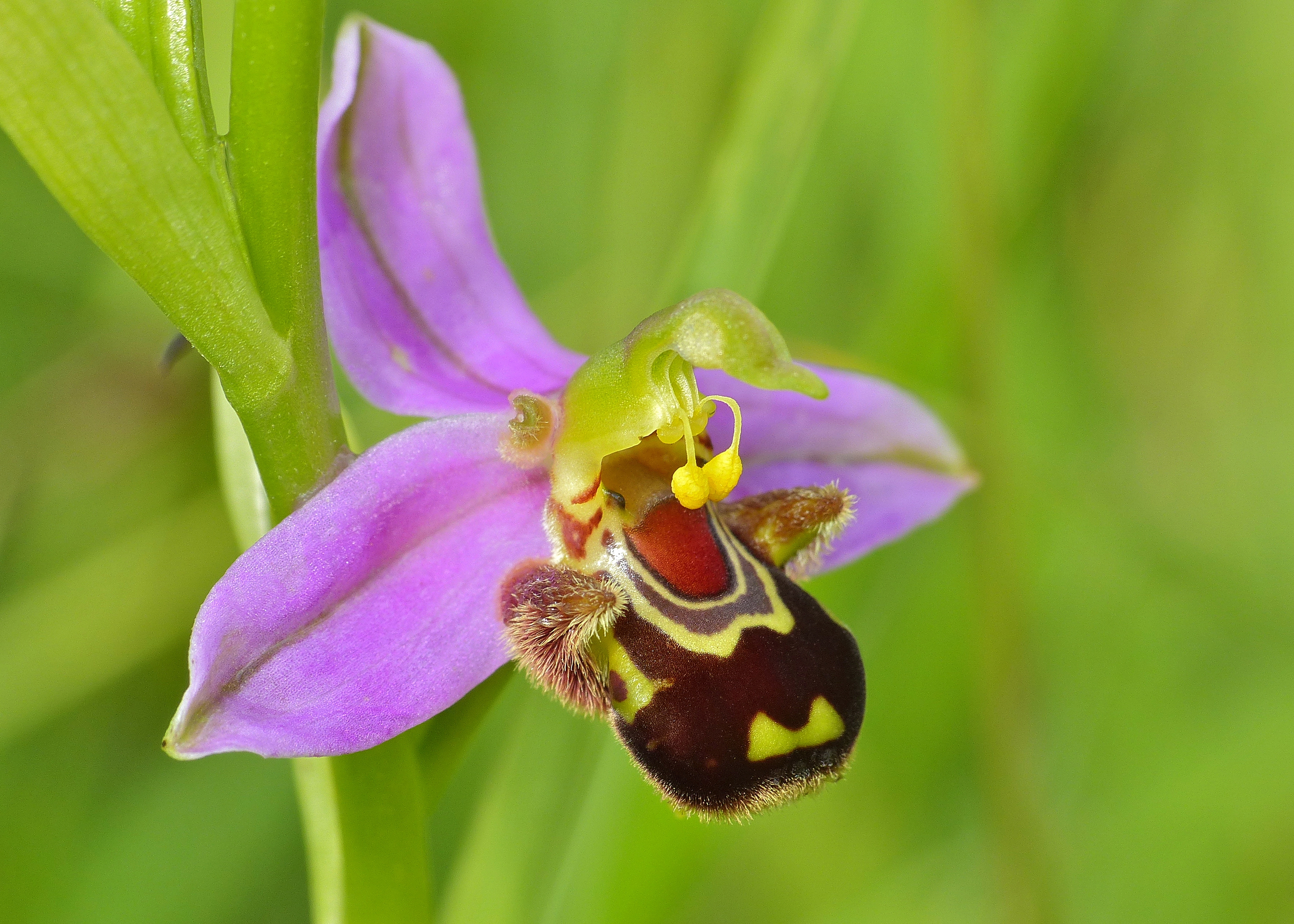
Ophrys apifera

The phenomenon was referenced (though not by name) in the 1259th issue of the online comic strip xkcd by Randall Munroe, titled "Bee Orchid" and published on September 2, 2013. In the comic, it is claimed that the orchid Ophrys apifera mimics the female of a bee species to attract males and ensure pollination, but that the bee is extinct and the orchid is doomed to follow, only delaying it by resorting to less effective self-pollination. In reality, only the first part is true: the flower mimics a bee, and reproduces exclusively by self-pollination in northern Europe, but it is pollinated successfully by bees of the genus Eucera in the Mediterranean region.

== See also ==
- Atavism
- Coevolution
- Coextinction
- Evolutionary arms race
- Evolutionary mismatch
- Evolutionary trap
- Exaptation
- Holocene extinction
- Keystone species
- Pleistocene extinction
- Pleistocene rewilding
- Vestigiality
