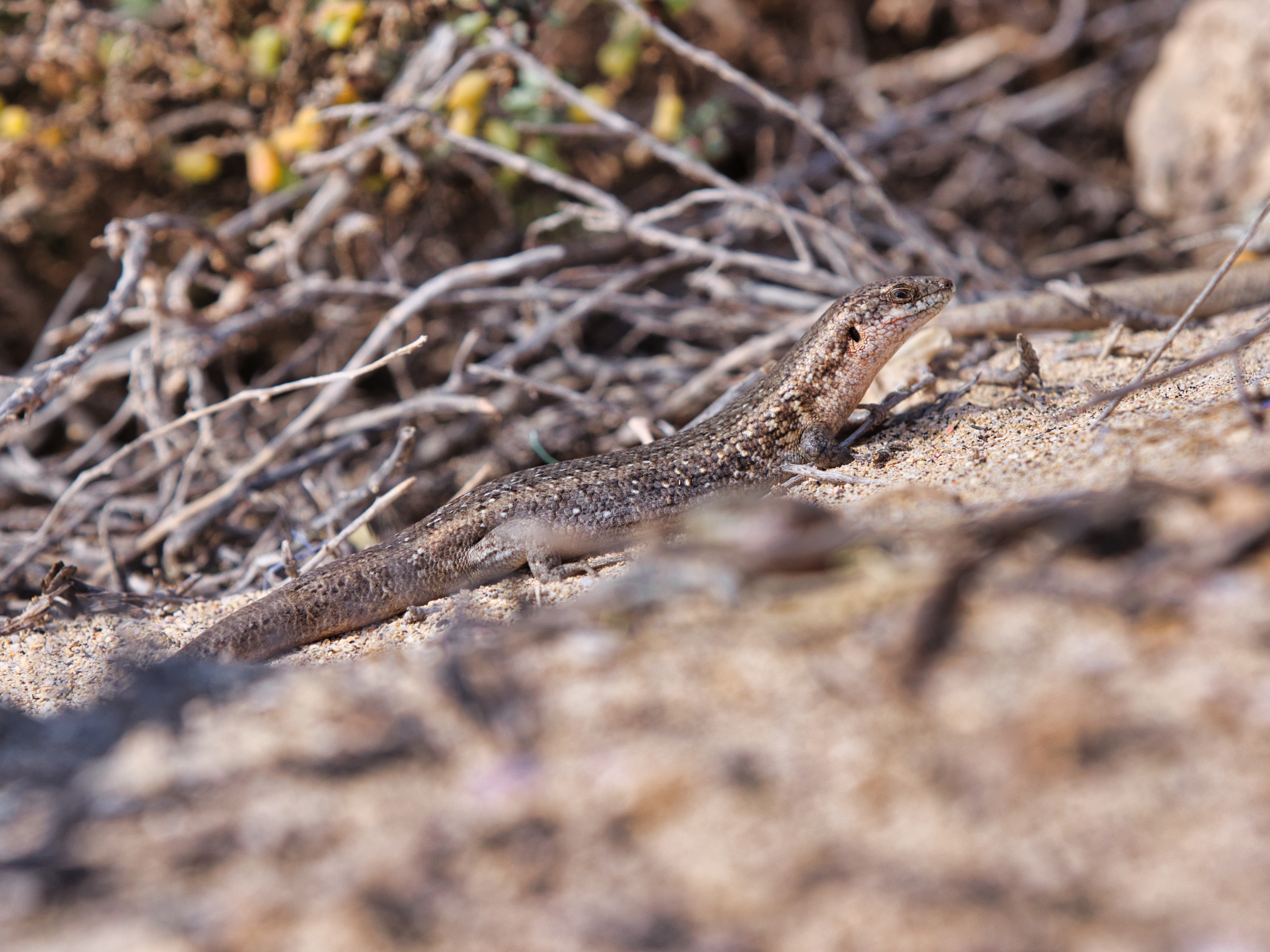
- An image of C. stangeri captured on the island of Santa Luzia, Cape Verde.

Conservation status
- Near Threatened (IUCN 3.1)

Scientific classification
- Kingdom: Animalia
- Phylum: Chordata
- Class: Reptilia
- Order: Squamata
- Family: Scincidae
- Genus: Chioninia
- Species: C. stangeri

Binomial name
- Chioninia stangeri (Gray, 1845)

Synonyms
- Euprepis stangeri Gray, 1845; Euprepes polylepis W. Peters, 1870; Euprepes hopfferi Bocage, 1875; Mabuia stangeri — Boulenger, 1887; Mabuya stangeri — Schleich, 1987; Mabuya stanjorgeri Frank & Ramus, 1995 (ex errore); Chioninia stangeri — Mausfeld et al., 2002; Trachylepis stangeri — Bauer, 2003

= Chioninia stangeri =

Species of lizard

Chioninia stangeri (English common name: Stanger's skink) is a species of lizard in the family Scincidae. It is endemic to the Cape Verde Islands.

== Geographic range ==
C. stangeri is found on the islands of São Vicente, Santa Luzia, Ilhéu Branco, and Ilhéu Raso.

== Habitat ==
The preferred natural habitat of C. stangeri is shrubland.

== Reproduction ==
C. stangeri is viviparous.

== Etymology ==
The specific name, stangeri, is in honor of English explorer William Stanger.
