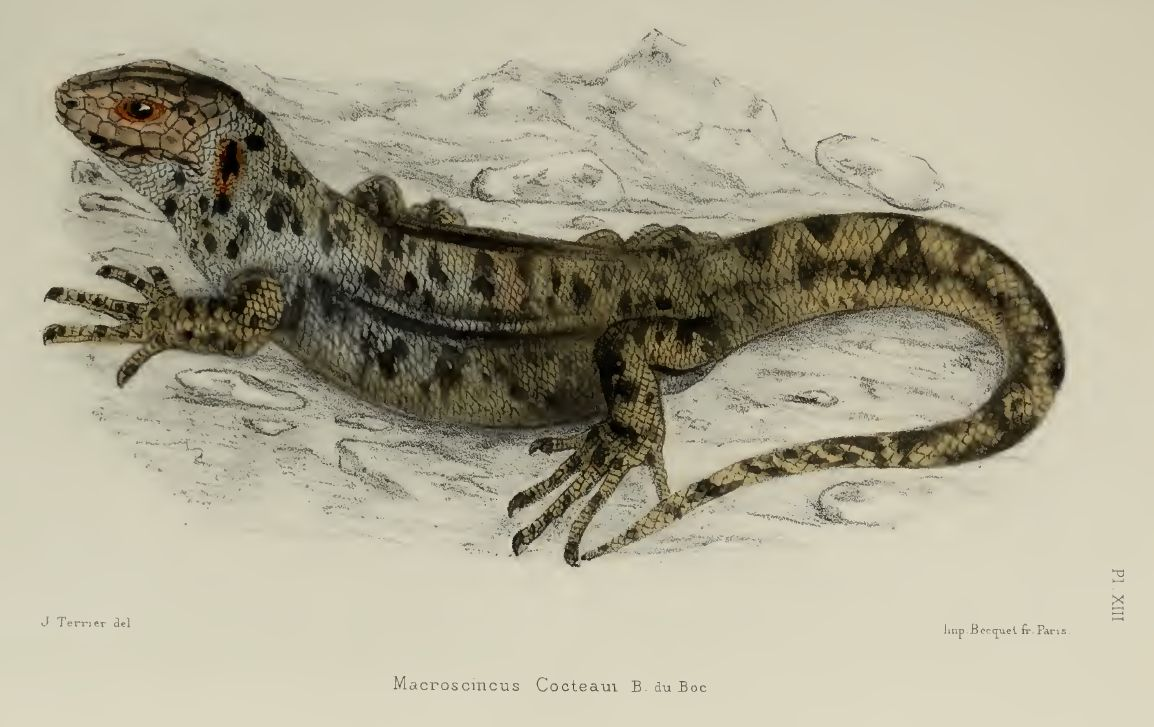
- Illustration, 1885

Conservation status
- Extinct (1940) (IUCN 3.1)

Scientific classification
- Kingdom: Animalia
- Phylum: Chordata
- Class: Reptilia
- Order: Squamata
- Family: Scincidae
- Genus: Chioninia
- Species: †C. coctei

Binomial name
- †Chioninia coctei (A.M.C. Duméril & Bibron, 1839)

Synonyms
- Euprepes coctei A.M.C. Duméril & Bibron, 1839; Macroscincus coctei — Bocage, 1873; Gongylus coctei — Frank & Ramus, 1995; Chioninia coctei — Miralles et al., 2010

= Cape Verde giant skink =

Extinct species of lizard

The Cape Verde giant skink (Chioninia coctei), also called Bibron's skink, Cocteau's skink, and lagarto in Cape Verdean Portuguese, is a recently extinct species of large lizard (skink) that was endemic to some of the Barlavento Islands of Cape Verde before disappearing in the 20th century.

== Taxonomy ==
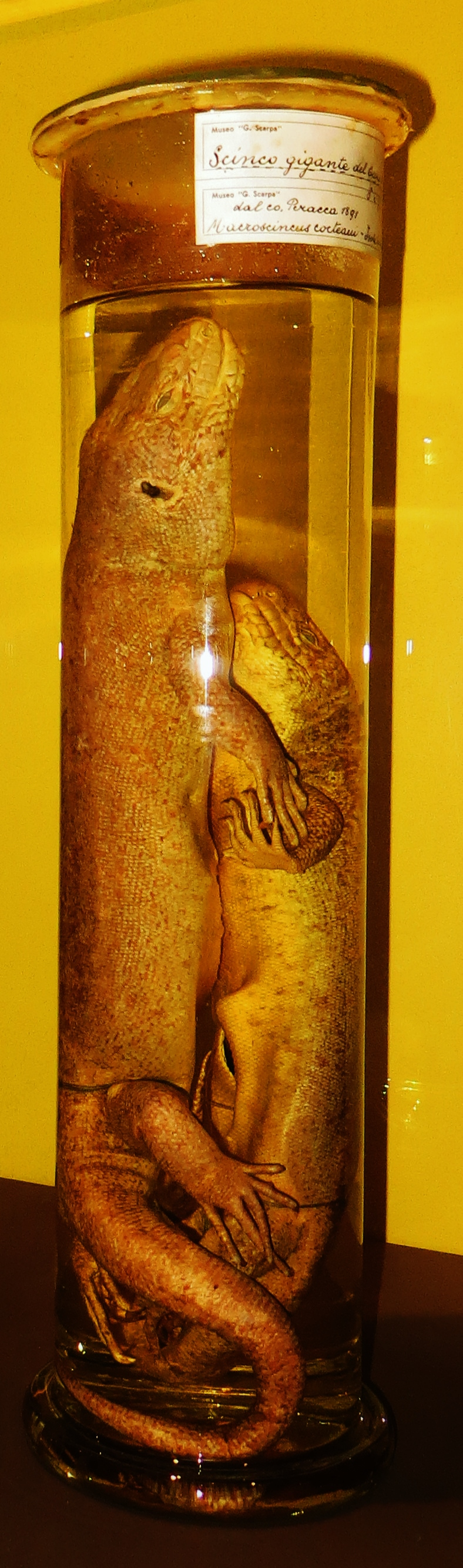
Two preserved specimens at Museo delle Scienze, Trento

The Cape Verde giant skink was first given the specific name Euprepes coctei by French zoologists André Marie Constant Duméril and Gabriel Bibron in 1839. The holotype was a preserved specimen at the National Museum of Natural History in Paris, one of five collected in 1784 by João da Silva Feijó in Ilhéu Branco, taken to Ajuda near Lisbon, and looted by the Napoleonic Army in 1808. The name coctei honors French physician and zoologist Jean-Théodore Cocteau (1798–1838). Since Duméril and Bibron ignored the history of the specimen, they listed its origin as "the coast of Africa" and the species remained in obscurity until it was rediscovered in 1873 by Cape Verdean doctor Frederico Hopffer. Portuguese zoologist José Vicente Barbosa du Bocage assigned the species to its own monotypic genus, Macroscincus (lit. "large skink").

In 2001, a Mitochondrial DNA study nested Macroscincus within a group of several Cape Verdean skink species assigned to the wastebasket genus Mabuya, suggesting a common origin in West Africa during the Late Miocene or Early Pliocene, dispersal to Cape Verde and subsequent adaptive radiation. The phylogeny of Mabuya was resolved in 2016, placing Cape Verdean skinks in the genus Chioninia, establishing Trachylepis of Africa and Madagascar as its sister genus, and limiting Mabuya to the Neotropics.

== Description ==
The Cape Verde giant skink was very large and robust compared to other skink species. Adults could attain a snout-to-vent length (SVL) of 32 cm (13 in). The tail was less than half the length of the body. It was described as prehensile and powerful, well adapted to climb trees, which surprised 19th century scientists who only knew Cape Verde giant skinks from denuded, arid islets. However, other authors noted that the species was capable of autotomy, which would be contradictory for a prehensile tail. The long digits, equivalent to a SENI (Scincidae Ecological Niche Index) value of 0.13, are consistent with a low canopy arboreal niche.

The teeth were located labiolingually, compressed, multicuspidate, pleurodontid and pterygoid.

There were three color morphs: grey, yellow, and intermediate. There was no banding but the body had dark stippled blotches and freckles with a yellow green-grey standard background. The underside was largely devoid of freckles, with a solid color lighter than the back. Dorsal scales were small and keeled in more than one hundred rows at the midsection but the osteodermal covering was less developed than in other skinks. The lower eyelid had a unique transparent "window" below.

Males reached their maximum size quicker than females, had a larger head, more robust jaws, and longer hindlegs. Older males had thick, hanging dewlaps that are unusual for skinks.

== Distribution ==
Subfossil remains of Cape Verde giant skink were found in the northwestern islands of São Vicente and Santa Luzia, and the islets Branco and Raso, which along with the smaller islet Pássaros were united into the paleoisland "Mindelo" during the colder stages of the Pleistocene. Testimonies of local fishermen also place giant skinks in São Nicolau island, but this remains unproven. São Nicolau was not connected by land to other islands during the Pleistocene.

== Behaviour and ecology ==
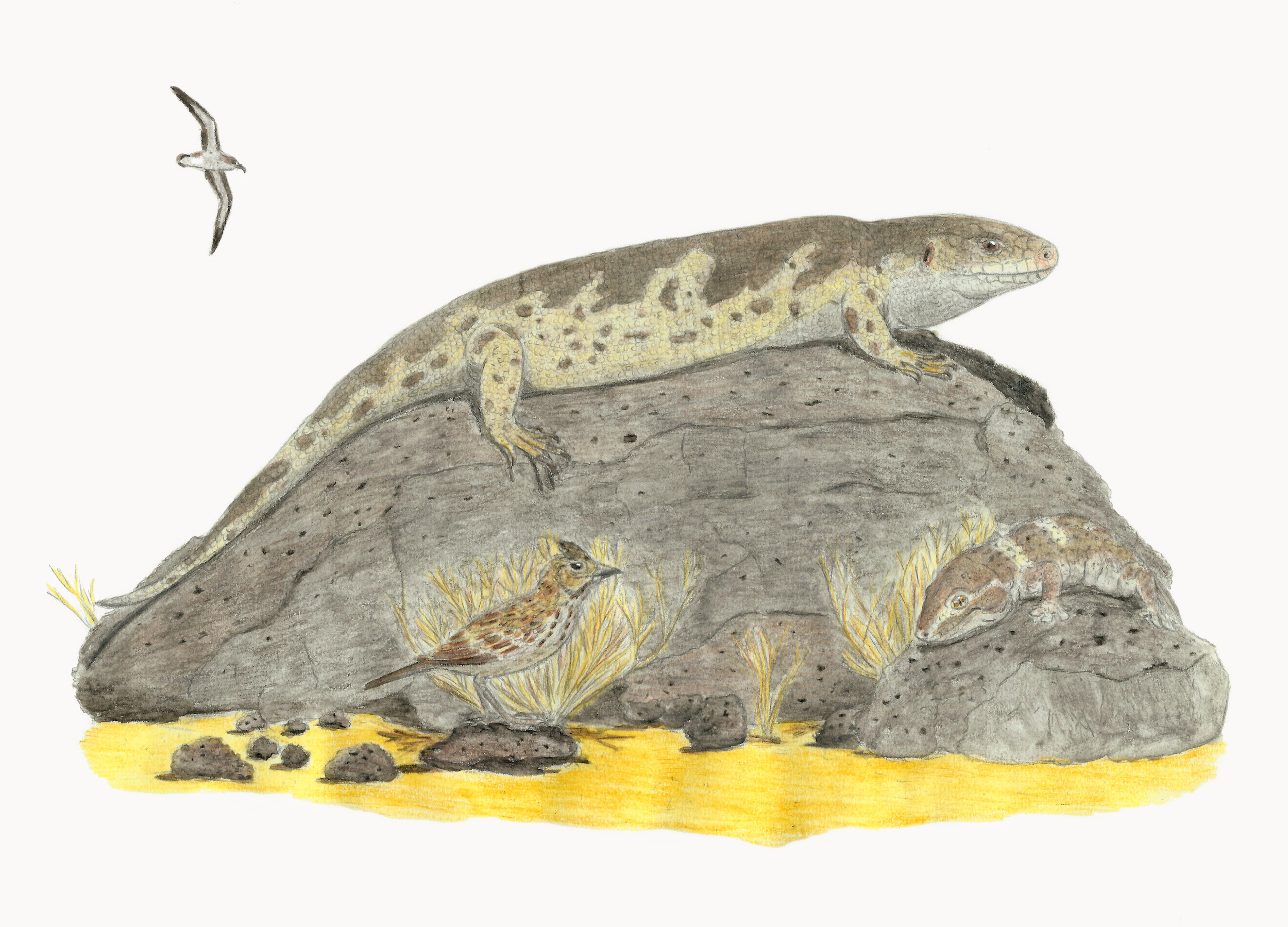
Restoration of a Cape Verde giant skink on a rock of Branco or Raso, with other species native to the islands like giant wall gecko, Raso lark, and a shearwater.

The behavior of the Cape Verde giant skink is largely unknown due to the lack of ethology studies before its extinction, though convergent evolution has been noted with two extant species: the African striped skink (Trachylepis striata) from southern and eastern Africa, adapted to a low canopy arboreal niche, and Vaillant's mabuya (Chioninia vaillanti), another large, herbivorous skink that is endemic to the southern Sotavento Islands of Cape Verde.

The transparent lower eyelid may have been an adaptation to spot predators below while giant skinks slept on the lower canopy with their eyes closed. In this case the predator's extinction would have long preceded the Cape Verde giant skink's own, making the latter an example of evolutionary anachronism. The need of light for this strategy would indicate that the giant skink was crepuscular and slept during the day. The Western barn owl is known to have eaten skinks before and after human arrival, but the "window" would have been useless against it due to owls attacking from above, rather than below. The unusual dewlap of old males could have played some role in territoriality.

The Cape Verde giant skink's long digestive track, abundant and varied helminthic community, and specialized dentition were well suited for a vegetarian diet. Although most animals died early in captivity, some survived for years on a diet of fruit and vegetation. One was noted as eating a bird. In Branco and Raso which are largely denuded of vegetation, the giant skinks adapted to live among large shearwater and petrel colonies and survived eating their regurgitations, feces, carrion, eggs, and hatchlings. Bones of skinks and seabirds are commonly found mixed together.

Preserved giant skinks have belly-button slits indicative of viviparous matrotrophy, yet a captive female was documented as laying a clutch of seven eggs over fifteen days in 1891, purely white colored and 1 1/2 inches in diameter. Other eggs are preserved at the Regional Museum of Turin. It is possible that the species used both modes of reproduction, like the sheen skink (Eugongylus albofasciolatus), where the same female was documented alternating between them.

The species was very tame in captivity, and probably was long lived and reproduced slowly, like other island reptiles.

== Extinction ==
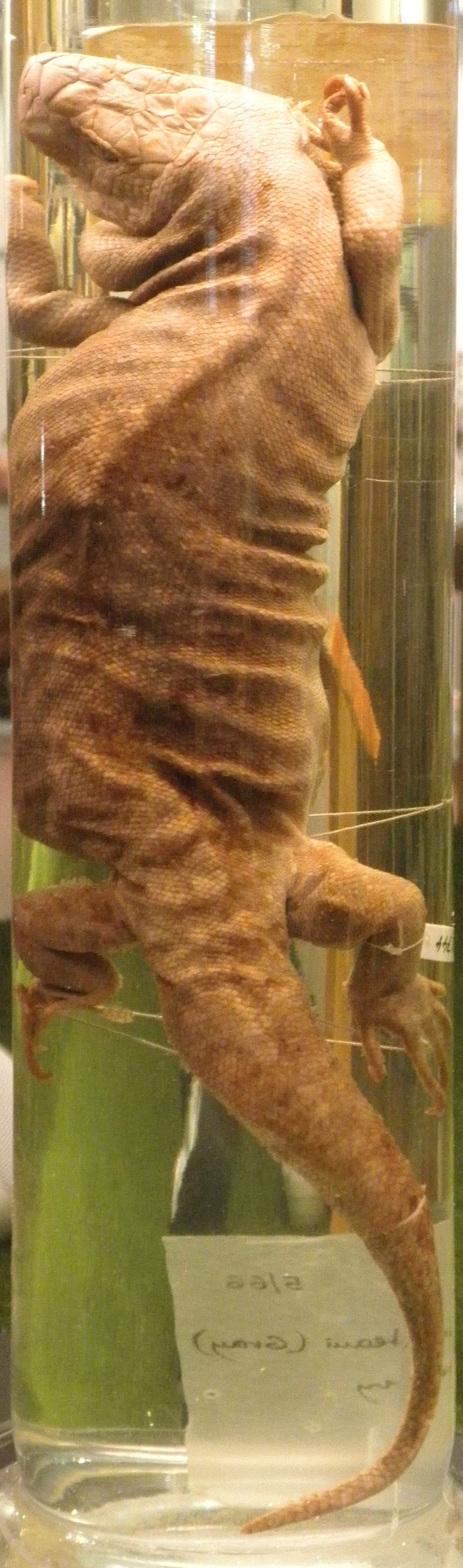
Individual preserved at the National Museum in Prague.

The "Mindelo" island broke up when sea levels rose at the end of the Pleistocene, fragmenting the Cape Verde giant skink's population. The local climate also became more arid in the Holocene, replacing the primitive forest with shrub savanna. Denudation increased after the Portuguese arrived in 1461, cut down the remaining tamarisk trees for firewood and construction, and introduced goats that ate the other vegetation. They also introduced mice, cats, and dogs, that ravaged the seabird colonies. Historical landfills show that settlers ate skinks themselves, but only occasionally and more rarely than seabirds. Examined owl pellets in Santa Luzia commonly contain skink bones before settlement, but lack any more recent than 1673, evidencing that they had become very rare in the island by then.

Giant skinks survived for longer in Branco and Raso, as they were not settled and remained free of introduced mammals. In 1783, Feijó wrote that the inhabitants of the Islands used the skins of Branco lizards to make shoes. Their fat was also used as medicine. According to an elderly resident interviewed by Hopffer, around 1833 a drought-induced famine struck Cape Verde and the government cut expenses by marooning thirty prisoners from Santo Antão in Branco, who survived by eating fish and skinks. This story is often quoted in sources discussing the giant skink's extinction, but is questioned by some authors because Branco has no freshwater sources.

The rediscovery of the species, its rarity, large size and tameness drove up the demand of specimens for European museums, zoos, and collectionists. In 1874 vulcanologist Alphons Stübbel discovered the Raso population. In 1890, the wildlife traffickers Thomas Castle and José Oliveira captured up to two hundred skinks in Branco and sold them in England, Germany, and Austria. The Italian herpetologist Mario Giacinto Peracca bought 40 skinks in London and held them for several years in his vivariums of Chivasso near Turin, where he made important observations on the reproduction and nutrition of the species. By 1896 Bocage feared that the species was being driven to extinction and requested Francisco Newton of the Museum of Lisbon to not import any more giant skinks. Boyd Alexander visited the islets in 1898 and noted that the giant skink was still common in Raso but had become very rare in Branco; Leonardo Fea, who visited in the same year, found no skinks in Branco at all. However captures continued in Raso by Fea himself and by Francisco Newton in 1900 (who didn't give the collected skinks to the Museum, and perhaps sold them to private collectors). In 1902, Prince Albert I of Monaco set traps in Branco for a week before he captured the first of six specimens.

Despite Peracca's efforts, no breeding colony was successfully established in captivity. By the early 20th century it was commonly assumed that the extinction of the Cape Verde giant skink was imminent. Peracca offered a high sum to Newton for the capture of as many skinks as possible, planning to establish an ex-situ population on an islet near Tuscany, but this never went through. In 1909 the entomologist and botanist Giacomo Cecconi claimed to have collected one individual in São Vicente, but this was deemed dubious by many. In 1915, an official of the Cape Verde colony informed the Museum of Lisbon that fishermen from Santo Antão had released dogs in Raso and that they had quickly killed all skinks on the islet. Some skinks survived in the possession of German and Austro-Hungarian zoos and collectionists even with the additional difficulties brought by World War I and the interwar period, until the species was declared extinct in 1940. An individual was reportedly seen in Branco in 1985, but several expeditions in the 1990s failed to find any. The IUCN red list classified it as extinct in 1996. In 2005, a claimed juvenile jaw was reported to have been found in feral cat droppings from Santa Luzia, but a 2006 survey of the island found no giant skinks.

== See also ==
- List of Macaronesian species extinct in the Holocene
- Roque Chico de Salmor giant lizard

== Further sources ==
- Adler GH, Austin CC, Dudley R (1995). "Dispersal and speciation of skinks among archipelagos in the tropical Pacific ocean". Evolutionary Ecology 9: 529–541.
- Austin CC (1995). "Molecular and morphological evolution in south Pacific scincid lizards: morphological conservatism and phylogenetic relationships of Papuan Lipinia (Scincidae)". Herpetologica 51: 291–300.
- Day, David (1979). Vanished Species. London: Gallery Books. pp. 254–255.
- Duméril AMC, Bibron G (1839). Erpétologie générale ou Histoire naturelle complète des Reptiles. Tome cinquième. [= General Herpetology or Complete Natural History of the Reptiles. Volume 5]. Paris: Roret. viii + 854 pp. (Euprepes coctei, new species, pp. 666–668). (in French).
- Grzimek, Bernhard (1975). Grzimek's Animal Life Encyclopedia. Volume 6, Reptiles. New York: Van Nostrand- Reinhold Company. pp. 178–179 .
- Hartdegen, Ruston W. (September 2003). "The green tree skink". Reptiles Magazine (Boulder, Colorado) 11 (9): 42–50.
- Honda M, Ota H, Kobayashi M, Nabhitabhata J, Yong H-S, Hikida T (1999). "Evolution of Asian and African Lygosomine Skinks of the Mabuya Group (Reptilia: Scincidae): A Molecular Perspective". Zoological Science 16 (6): 979–984.
- Love, Bill (January 2003). "Mystery skink. Herpetological quiries". Reptiles Magazine 11 (1): 12.
- Pether, Jim (April 2003). "In search of Macroscincus coctei ". Reptiles Magazine 11 (4): 70–81.
- de Vosjoli, Phillippe; Fast, Frank (1995). "Account from the Daily journals of Phillippe de Vosjoli". The Vivarium (Escondido, California) 6 (5): 4–7, 12–17, 36–38, 40–44.
- de Vosjoli, Phillippe; Fast, Frank (1995). "Notes from a herpetological field trip to New Caledonia (Part II) – Notes on three species of New Caledonian geckos of the Genus Rhactodactylus ". The Vivarium 6 (6): 26–29, 53–54.
- Walls, Jerry G. (1994). Skinks: identification, care, and breeding. Neptune City, New Jersey: T.F.H. Publications. pp. 52–58.
