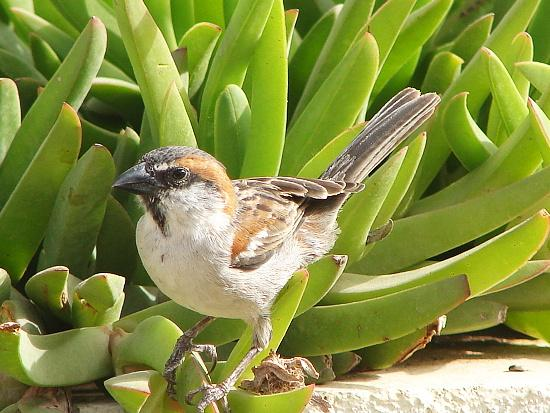

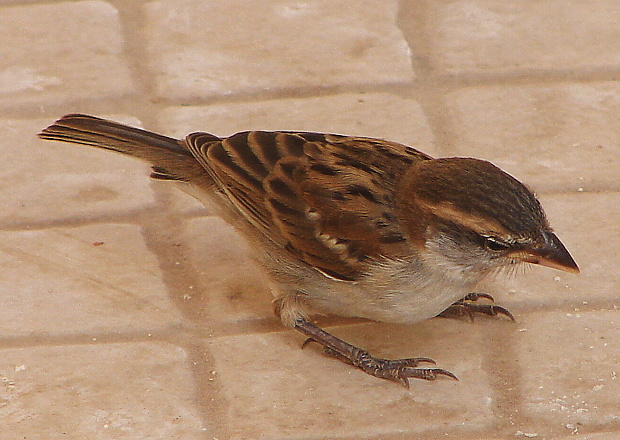
- Male (above) and female (below) on Sal

Conservation status
- Least Concern (IUCN 3.1)

Scientific classification
- Kingdom: Animalia
- Phylum: Chordata
- Class: Aves
- Order: Passeriformes
- Family: Passeridae
- Genus: Passer
- Species: P. iagoensis

Binomial name
- Passer iagoensis (Gould, 1838)

Synonyms
- Pyrgita iagoensis Gould, 1837; Passer brancoensis Oustalet, 1883; Passer erthrophrys Temminck

= Iago sparrow =

Species of bird

The Iago sparrow (Passer iagoensis), also known as the Cape Verde or rufous-backed sparrow, is a passerine bird of the sparrow family Passeridae. It is endemic to the Cape Verde archipelago, in the eastern Atlantic Ocean near western Africa. Females and young birds have brown plumage with black marks above, and a dull grey underside, and are distinguished from other species of sparrow by their large, distinct supercilium. Males have a brighter underside and bold black and chestnut stripes on their head. At 12.5–13 centimetres (4.9–5.1 in) long, it is a smaller sparrow. This bird's vocalisations are mostly variations on its chirp, which differ somewhat between males and females.

The Iago sparrow was once thought to be most closely related to the rufous sparrows, a group of species within the genus Passer which live in similar habitats on continental Africa. Though the Iago sparrow is closest to the rufous sparrows in appearance, it has a number of crucial differences in morphology and behavior, and is separated by thousands of kilometres. It may in fact be more closely related to the house sparrow and Spanish sparrow. In Cape Verde it occurs on all but one island, and on most of them it is quite common. The Iago sparrow occurs in most of the habitats that are available in its range, such as lava plains, rocky hills, and gorges; however, the house sparrow and Spanish sparrow are typically present instead in denser settlements and richer cultivated areas respectively. Because the Iago sparrow is not under any serious threats, it is assessed as Least Concern on the IUCN Red List.

== Description ==
The Iago sparrow is a small sparrow, 12.5–13 centimetres (4.9–5.1 in) long, with a wing length of 5.5–6.9 centimetres (2.2–2.7 in). Its plumage is similar to that of the house sparrow, and it similarly is sexually dimorphic. The male has a black or greyish-black crown and eyestripe, a grey nape and a small patch of white on the lower forehead. The sides of its head, especially above the eye, are a rich cinnamon colour. The scapulars are white and brown, while the rest of the upperparts are brown, streaked with black and beige. The cheeks and underparts are pale grey, and the throat and chin are marked with a small black bib. The female is grey-brown, with black-streaked wings and breast, and pale grey underparts. It is very similar to the female house sparrow but has a more apparent pale supercilium (stripe over the eye). The juvenile resembles the adult female, but young males are more chestnut from an early age, with a trace of a black bib on the chin. In 1898, ornithologist Boyd Alexander reported that adults begin moulting in early February, and some birds were still in moult by late May.

The Iago sparrow's vocalisations include calls, varying between the sexes, elaborations of these called 'songs', and an alarm call. Calls are chirps, somewhat similar to those of other sparrows, the usual version made by males described as a "twangy" or "chew-weep", and that of females described as a "more sibilant" chisk. The song is a long, elaborated series of notes, and is made by breeding males in their nests. An alarm call like that of other sparrows, transcribed chur-chur-chur, is also used.

== Taxonomy ==
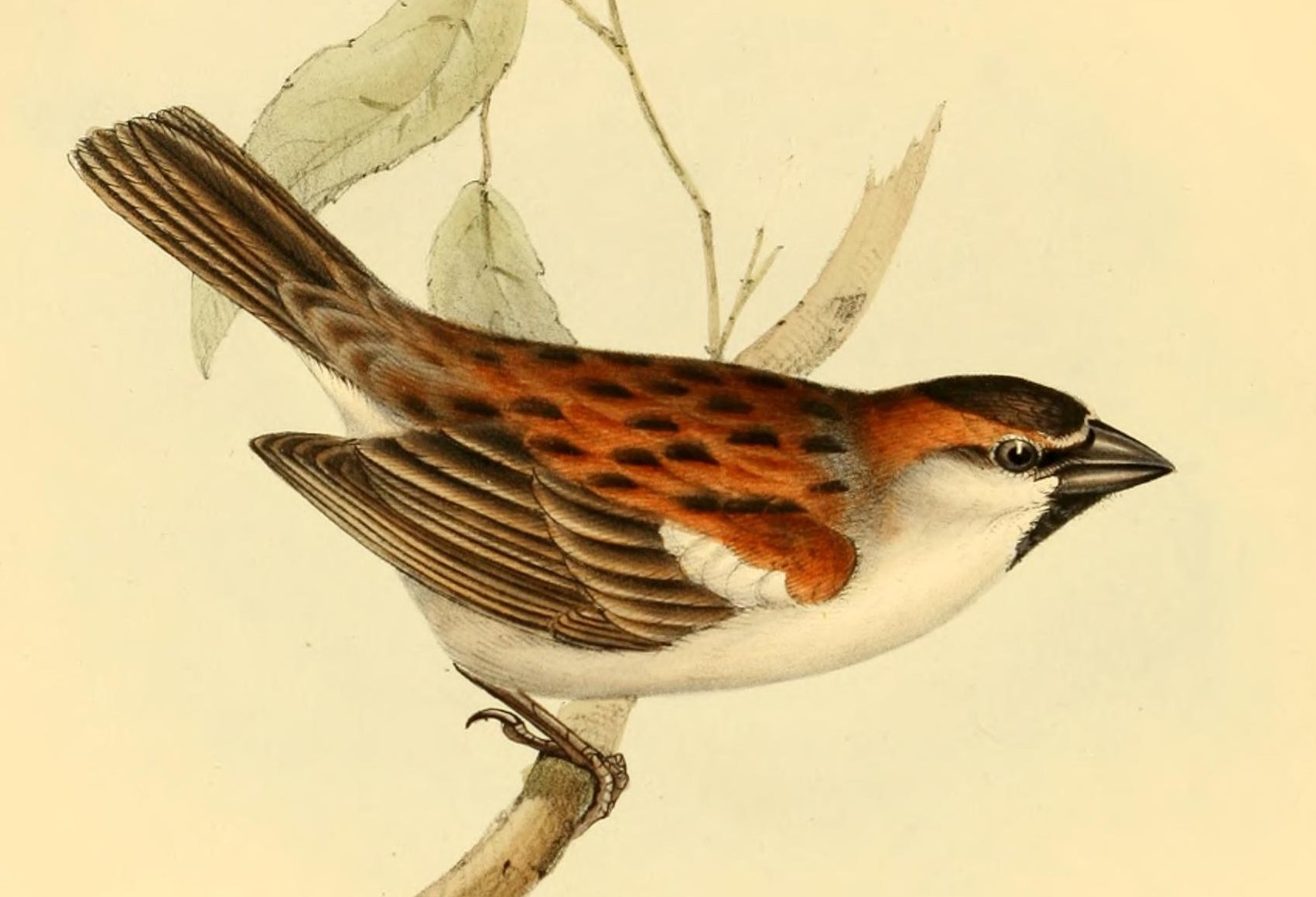
Illustration of a male by John Gould

The Iago sparrow was first collected by Charles Darwin during the first stop of the second voyage of HMS Beagle at the island of Santiago (St. Iago). It was described for him in 1837 by zoologist John Gould, in the Proceedings of the Zoological Society of London, and given the name of Pyrgita iagoensis. By the time Gould wrote The Zoology of the Voyage of H.M.S. Beagle with Darwin and three other zoologists in 1841, he had placed the Iago sparrow in the genus Passer, where it remains. The genus, among the sparrows of the Old World in the family Passeridae, also contains at least 20 other species, among them the house sparrow and Eurasian tree sparrow.

Within its genus, the Iago sparrow has been considered one of the African 'rufous sparrows', a group which also includes species such as the great sparrow (Passer motitensis). These birds were usually treated as distinct species until Reginald Ernest Moreau, writing in the 1962 Check-list of the Birds of the World, lumped the Iago sparrow and the mainland rufous sparrows as the single species Passer motitensis. This taxonomy was followed frequently until J. Denis Summers-Smith, a world authority on sparrows, argued in the 1980s that the Iago sparrow's many differences in morphology and behaviour, and separation from the other rufous sparrows by about 5,000 kilometres (3,100 mi), are sufficient grounds for species status. Studies of mitochondrial and nuclear DNA have since suggested it may be a close relative of the house sparrow and the Spanish sparrow and not the rufous sparrows.

French ornithologist Émile Oustalet described a specimen from Branco as a separate species Passer brancoensis in 1883, which was recognised as the subspecies Passer iagoensis brancoensis by W. R. P. Bourne, who claimed to observe differences between Iago sparrows from different islands. According to Bourne, birds of Passer iagoensis iagoensis on more wooded islands in the south are darker and larger, and also behave more like house or Spanish sparrows, competing with them better in human-altered habitats. He later wrote that the variations he saw comprised two clinal trends, of increasing darkness towards the south, and of smaller size further from the continental coast. Charles Vaurie, examining differences in plumage and measurements of specimens in major museums, did not find any significant variation, and neither Vaurie nor Summers-Smith recognised any subspecies.

== Distribution and habitat ==
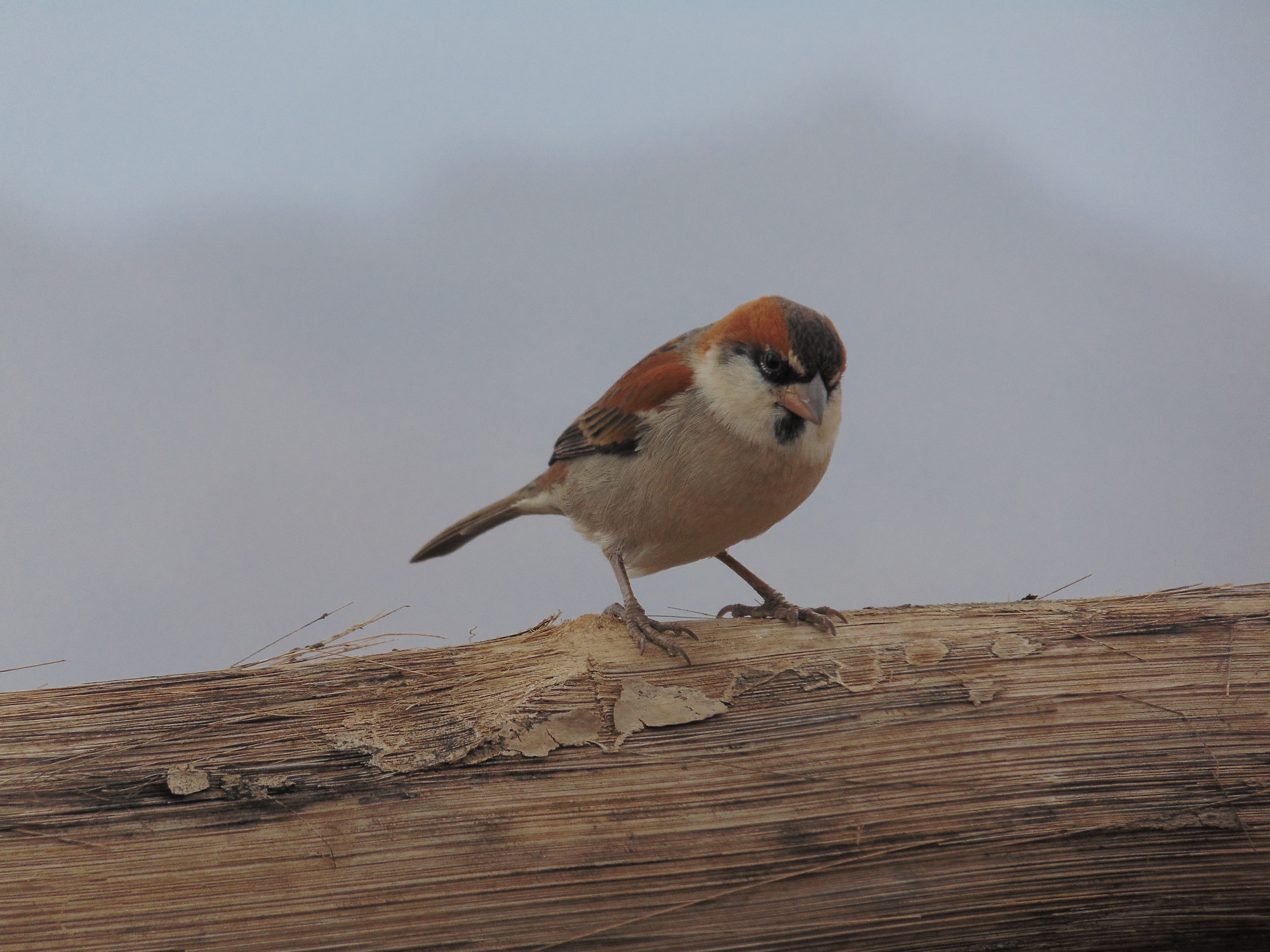
A male on Monte Verde, São Vicente

The Iago sparrow is endemic to the archipelago of Cape Verde. It is common on most islands, excluding Fogo (from which it is absent) and Santa Luzia, Branco and Sal (on which it is scarce). The Iago sparrow is found commonly in a variety of habitats, including flat lava plains, coastal cliffs, gorges, and the edges of farmland, at altitudes of up to 1,200 metres (3,900 ft). It also occurs in settled areas and gardens, where it may overlap somewhat with the house sparrow, but usually not with the Spanish sparrow. The Spanish sparrow occurs in richer cultivated land with larger trees and villages, restricting the Iago sparrow to more arid cultivated land with smaller trees. In settlements where both the house sparrow and Iago sparrow occur, house sparrows tend to occupy the denser areas, while Iago sparrows are found primarily around trees and open spaces. In agricultural areas the Iago sparrow may do some damage to crops, mostly by eating buds and shoots. The Iago sparrow is highly common within its limited range, though its exact population is not known. Though the size of its range means it may be at risk to unpredicted changes in its environment, it is assessed as Least Concern by the IUCN Red List.

In May 2013 four vagrant Iago sparrows were seen at Hansweert, in the Netherlands, having flown onto a ship as it passed by the island of Raso.

== Behaviour ==
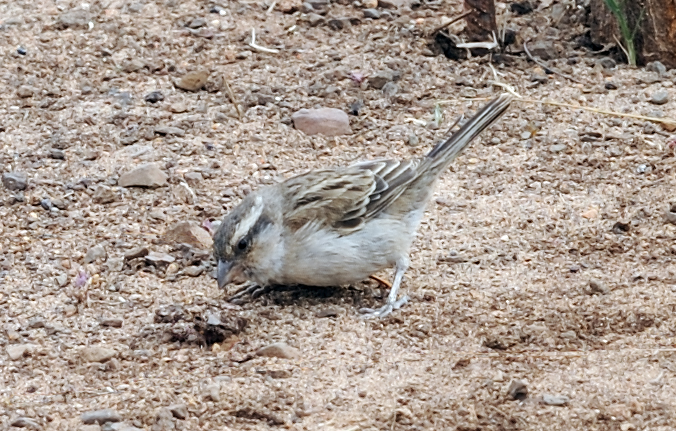
A female foraging, on Sal

The Iago sparrow is gregarious while foraging and breeding. Outside of the breeding season, Iago sparrows are always in flocks, which may be of considerable size. It flocks with other birds, even warblers such as the blackcap and the Cape Verde warbler. The Iago sparrow is not very shy toward humans, allowing them to approach, even while it is at its nest. Birds on the isolated and uninhabited island of Raso will even perch on human visitors with little fear. Because of the scarcity of water to drink in its habitat, it has a strong attraction to sources of water, and large flocks may congregate when humans provide water it can drink. It often is seen dust bathing in small groups, a behavior necessary to keep clean with a paucity of water.

The adult Iago sparrow feeds mainly on the seeds of grass and grain (the main cereal crop grown in Cape Verde is maize), but also on insects and plant shoots. They can do damage to crops by eating young leaves, and like house sparrows will eat the food scraps available near houses. Nestlings, by contrast to adults, are fed almost exclusively on insects, especially caterpillars, flies, and orthopterans. The Iago sparrow forages mostly on the ground, moving restlessly whilst clinging to the ground like a mouse.

=== Breeding ===
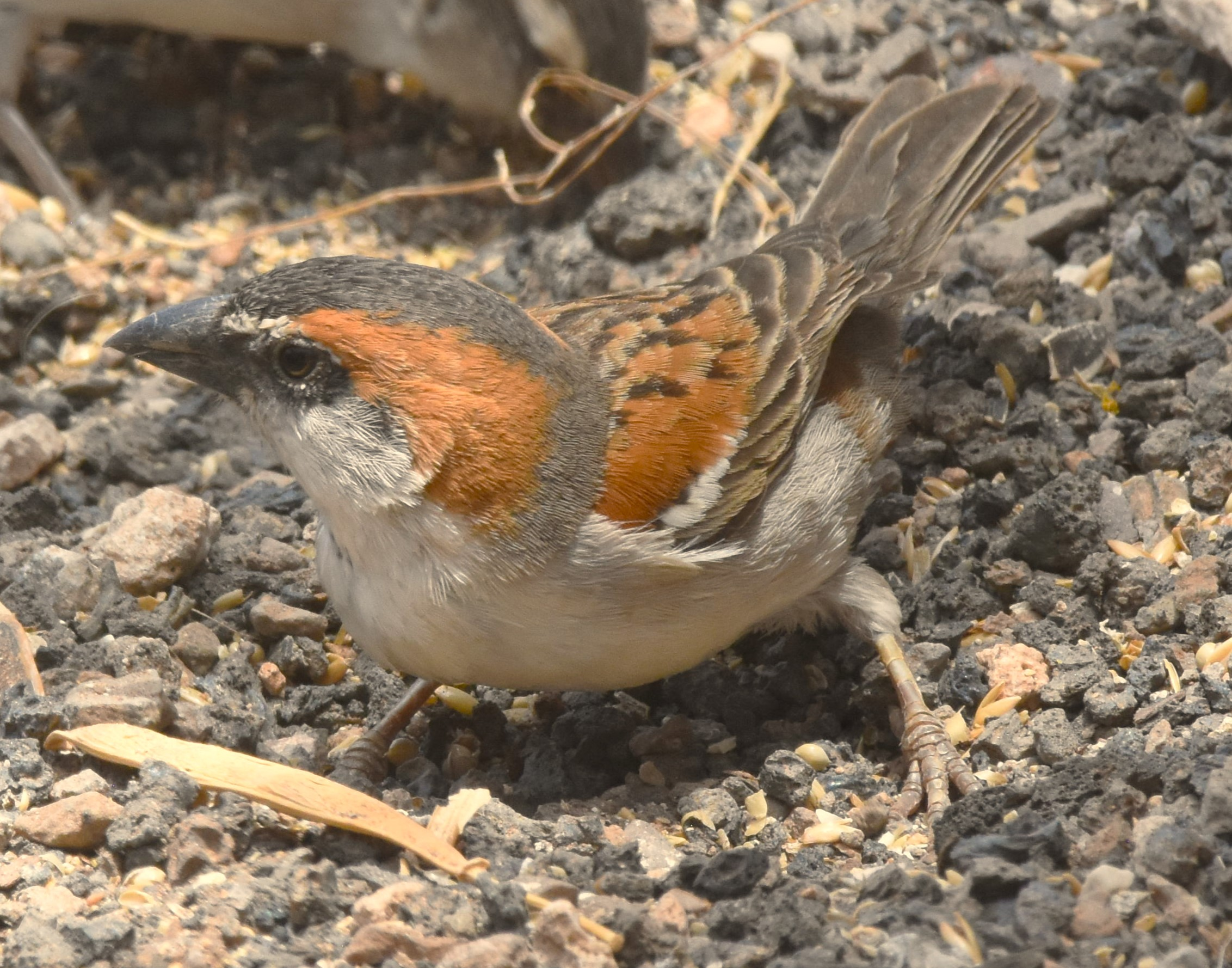
Cape Verde Sparrow near Santa Maria, Sal

The breeding season generally begins in August and September with the onset of the humid season, but the climate during a particular year may change the timing of breeding. On Cima, W. R. P. Bourne observed females remaining in flocks while males began to take up locations on rocky slopes from which they could sing. The breeding season is typically long enough that some pairs may be fledging young before others even start to build a nest; the greatest number of pairs breed when rains come, in October to November. Unmated males attract females by calling out beside a prospective nest site. When approached by a female, the displaying male will increase the intensity of his calls and hop around her while crouching with chestnut rump- and shoulder-feathers exposed. The male begins building the nest, but once a pair is formed both birds of the pair participate in the nest's construction and remain close together. Copulation occurs after the nest has been constructed, while the female is dominant in the pair for a time. The male invites the female to copulate by giving the crouching courtship display, and after ignoring and pecking at him initially, the female solicits copulation by crouching herself. When four vagrants were in the Netherlands in May 2013, a male was seen mounting a second male, apparently after the second crouched submissively to resolve a fight between them. This is the only recorded case of homosexual behaviour in sparrows.

Nests are usually built a few metres apart in loose colonies of at most about 10 pairs, although sometimes pairs nest alone. The nest may be built in a range of habitats, and usually is built as a cup in a hole or crevice in a cliff or a wall. They may use suitable human-built structures, such as house eaves and streetlights. The nest is an open structure made of grass, lined with feathers and hairs, packed densely for compactness. Some ornithologists have reported this bird building domed nests in acacia trees, but these records may reflect confusion with the Spanish sparrow. The average clutch contains three to five eggs. Both sexes incubate the eggs and bring food to their young, but females do more. Eggs are incubated for short spells, around 10 minutes, and males incubate for shorter periods and less often. Though the male accompanies the female when she finds food and brings it to their nestlings, he less often brings any himself; once the young fledge and leave the nest the male is more active feeding them.
