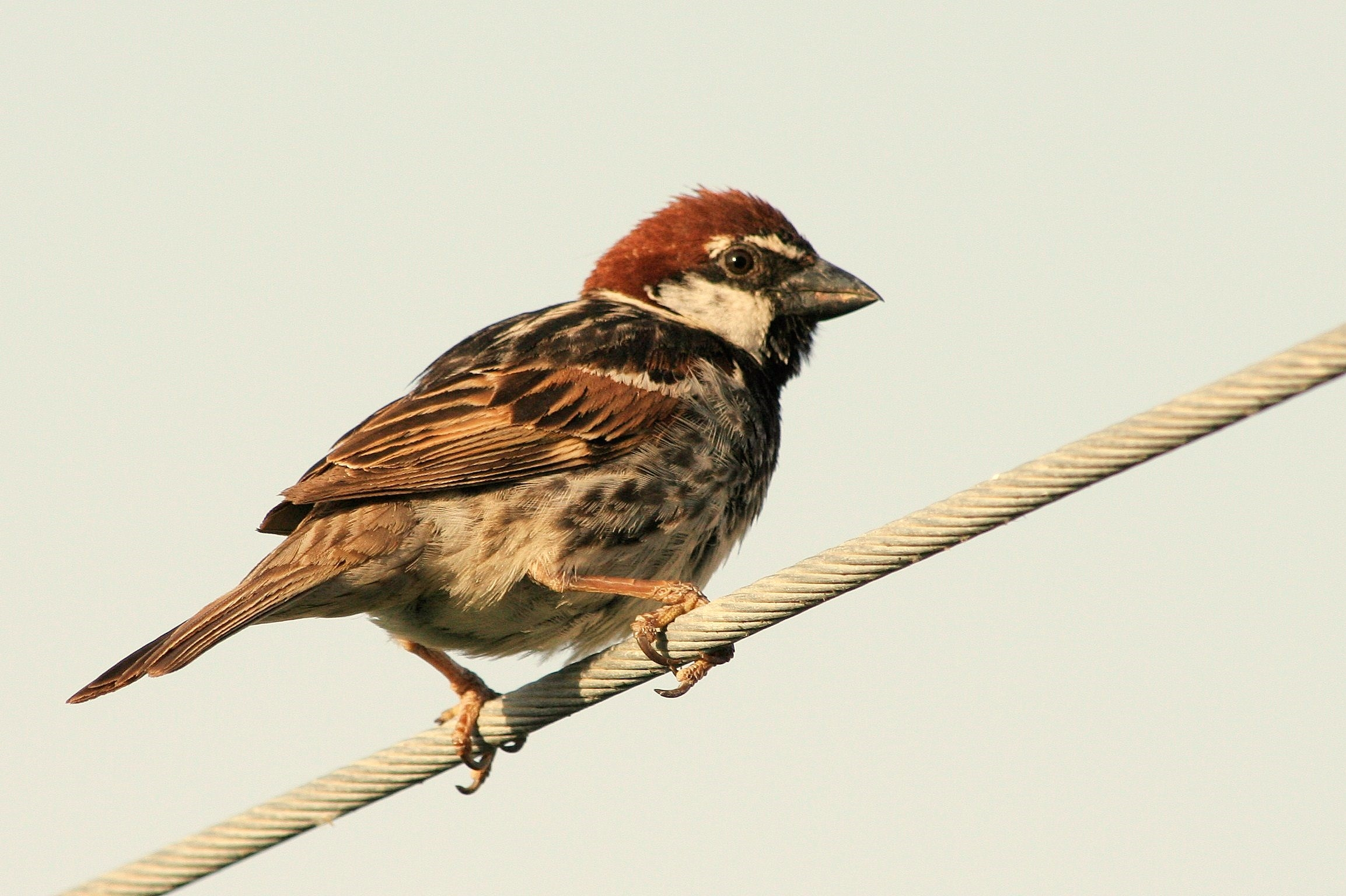
- Male in Sardinia

Conservation status
- Least Concern (IUCN 3.1)

Scientific classification
- Kingdom: Animalia
- Phylum: Chordata
- Class: Aves
- Order: Passeriformes
- Family: Passeridae
- Genus: Passer
- Species: P. hispaniolensis

Binomial name
- Passer hispaniolensis (Temminck, 1820)

= Spanish sparrow =

Species of bird

The Spanish sparrow or willow sparrow (Passer hispaniolensis) is a passerine bird of the sparrow family Passeridae. It is found in the Mediterranean region and south-west and central Asia. It is very similar to the closely related house sparrow, and the two species show their close relation in a "biological mix-up" of hybridisation in the Mediterranean region, which complicates the taxonomy of this species.

== Description ==
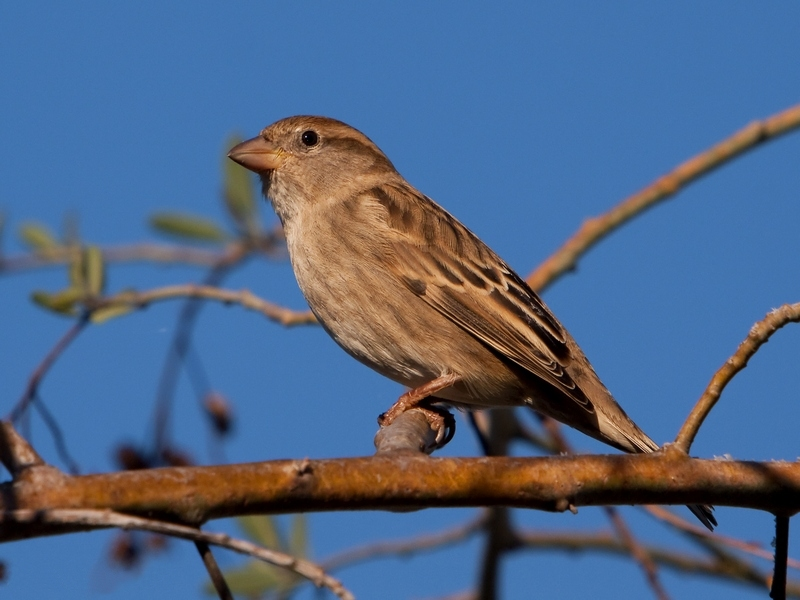
Female in the Canary Islands (Note the streaked breast)

The Spanish sparrow is a rather large sparrow, at 15–16 cm (6–6.5 in) in length, and 22–36 g (0.78–1.27 oz) in weight. It is slightly larger and heavier than house sparrows, and also has a slightly longer and stouter bill. The male is similar to the house sparrow in plumage, but differs in that its underparts are heavily streaked with black, has a chestnut rather than grey crown, and has white rather than grey cheeks. The female is effectively inseparable from the house sparrow in its basic plumage, which is grey-brown overall but more boldly marked. The female has light streaking on its sides, a pale cream supercilium, and broad cream streaks on its back.

Two subspecies of the Spanish sparrow – the western Spanish sparrow (P. h. hispaniolensis) and eastern Spanish sparrow (P. h. transcaspicus) – are recognised, with little visible difference between them in worn breeding plumage. They are more easily distinguished in fresh winter plumage, with the eastern subspecies P. h. transcaspicus being paler with less chestnut.

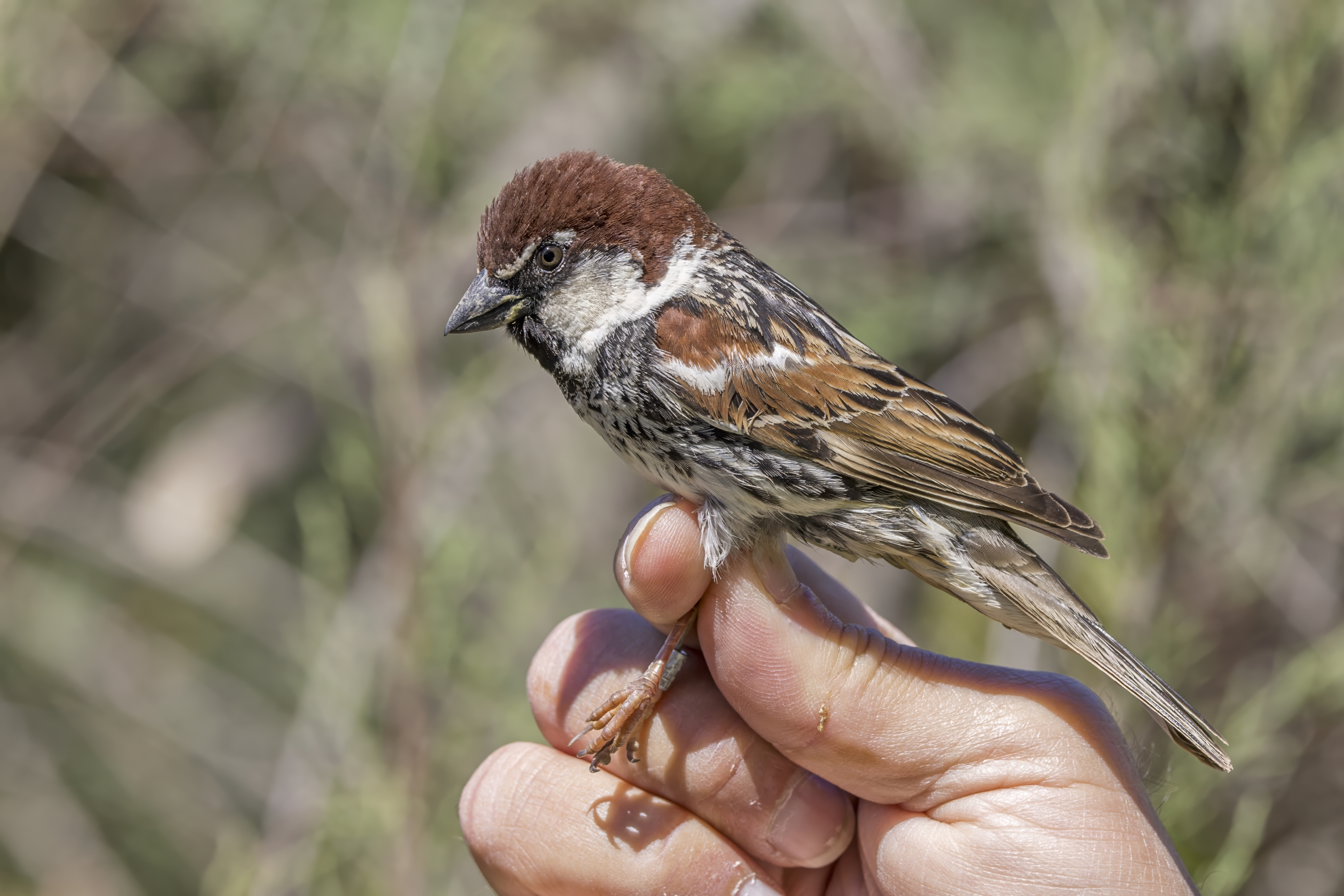
ringed male (breeding plumage) in Malta

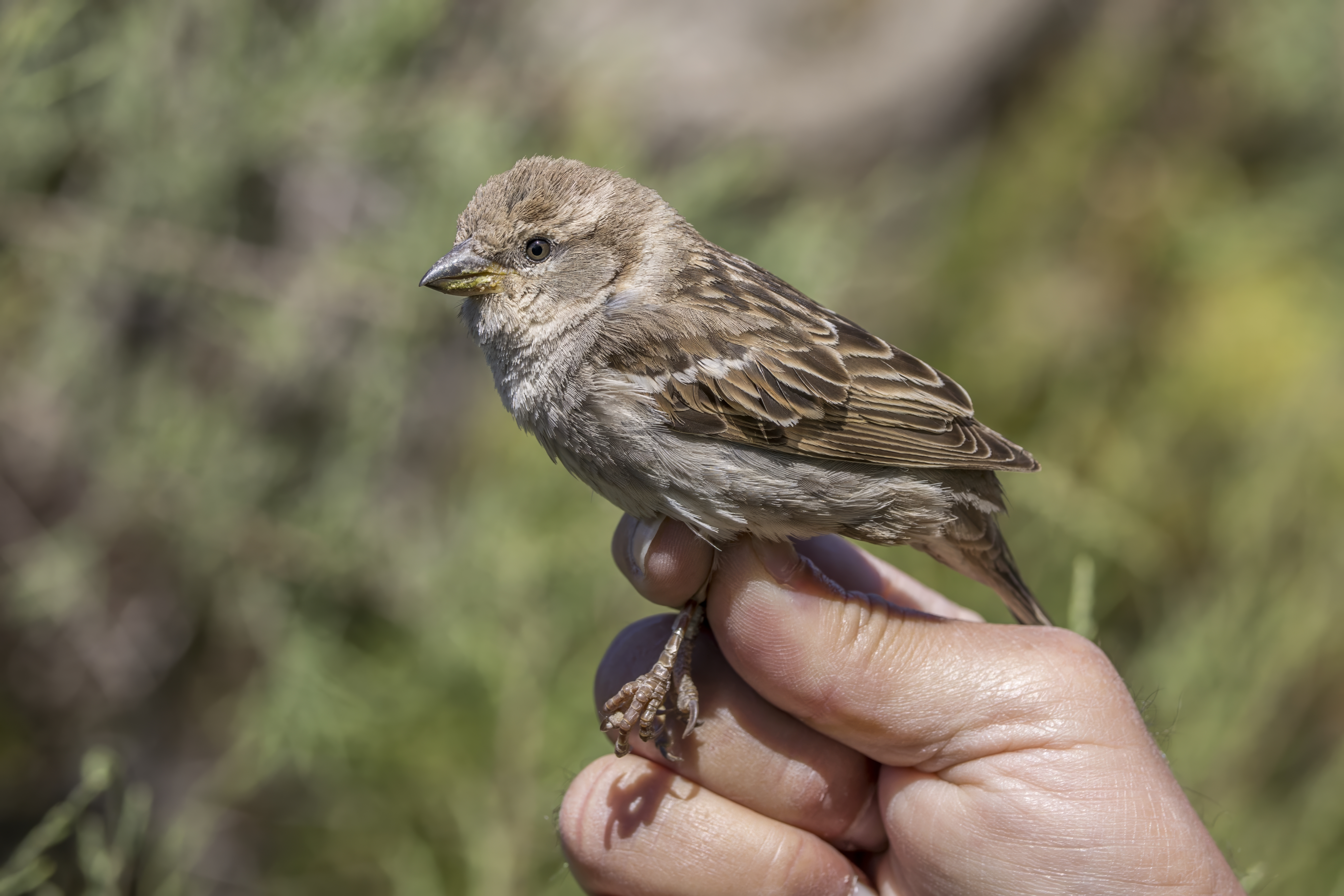
ringed female in Malta

=== Voice ===
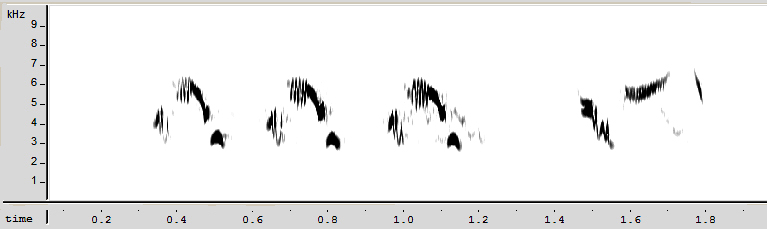
Sonogram of a male Spanish sparrow's song

The Spanish sparrow's vocalisations are similar to those of the house sparrow. The male gives a call somewhat different from that of the house sparrow when displaying at its nest. This call is a pair of strident, disyllabic chirps, similar to those of the house sparrow, but louder and high-pitched, transcribed as chweeng-chweeng, cheela-cheeli. A similar call, softer and more like the house sparrow's tschilp, is used by birds arriving or departing at roosting sites. The Spanish sparrow's other calls are almost the same as those of the house sparrow. A soft quer quer quer is given at the nest by mated pairs, a quer-it flight call is given by flocking birds, and a chur-chur-it call is given as a threat.

== Taxonomy and systematics ==
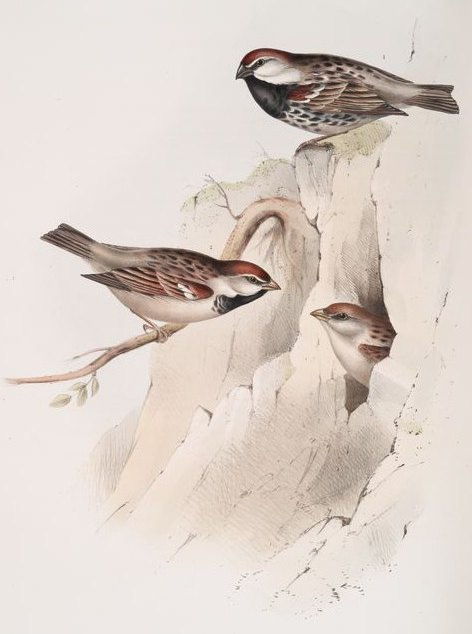
An illustration by John Gould of a male Spanish sparrow (above) and an Italian sparrow pair

Its taxonomy is greatly complicated by the "biological mix-up" it forms with the house sparrow in the Mediterranean. In most of the Mediterranean, one or both of the two species occurs, with only a limited degree of hybridisation. On the Italian Peninsula and Corsica, the two species are replaced by the Italian sparrow, a puzzling type of sparrow apparently intermediate between the Spanish sparrow and the house sparrow.

The Italian sparrow has been classified as a hybrid between the Spanish sparrow and the house sparrow, a subspecies of the Spanish sparrow, a subspecies of the house sparrow and/or a separate species. The Spanish sparrow also hybridises freely with the house sparrow in parts of North Africa (northeastern Algeria, Tunisia, and northwestern Libya), forming highly variable mixed populations with a full range of characters from pure house sparrows to pure Spanish sparrows. On the Mediterranean islands of Malta, Gozo, Crete, Rhodes and Karpathos, there are more apparently intermediate birds of unknown status.

The Spanish sparrow was first described by the Dutch zoologist Coenraad Jacob Temminck as Fringilla hispaniolensis, from a specimen collected at Algeciras, in southern Spain. The usual English name refers to the description of the species from Spain. The name willow sparrow, referring to the moist habitat of this bird, is sometimes used, especially when the Italian sparrow is considered the same species. The genus name Passer is the Latin word for sparrow, and hispaniolensis is Neo-Latin for "Spanish".

Two subspecies of Spanish sparrow are usually recognised, the western nominate subspecies hispaniolensis, and the eastern transcaspicus, described by Austrian ornithologist Viktor von Tschusi zu Schmidhoffen in 1902 from Ýolöten, Turkmenistan. Birds in Anatolia and Cyprus are usually considered to belong to P. h. transcaspicus, but birds as far east as Ceylanpınar have been noted as intermediates and the difference between the two subspecies may actually be clinal.

== Distribution and habitat ==
The Spanish sparrow has a highly complex distribution in the Mediterranean region, Macaronesia, and southwest to central Asia. It breeds mostly in a band of latitude about 15 degrees wide, from the Danube Valley and the Aral Sea in the north to Libya and central Iran in the south. Its range has expanded greatly by natural colonisation over the last two centuries, in the Balkans, where it reached Romania, Serbia, and Moldova from 1950 onwards; and in Macaronesia, where its range expansion has been attributed to introductions and travel by ship, but was more likely natural colonisation by migrating birds. Vagrants occur widely, as far north as Scotland and Norway.

A study has shown that vagrant individuals tend to occur very close to railway lines, much closer than with other vagrant passerines. This results suggests that Spanish sparrows' vagrancy and expansion may be facilitated in part by cargo trains.

Distribution of the Spanish and Italian sparrows

=== Subspecies hispaniolensis ===
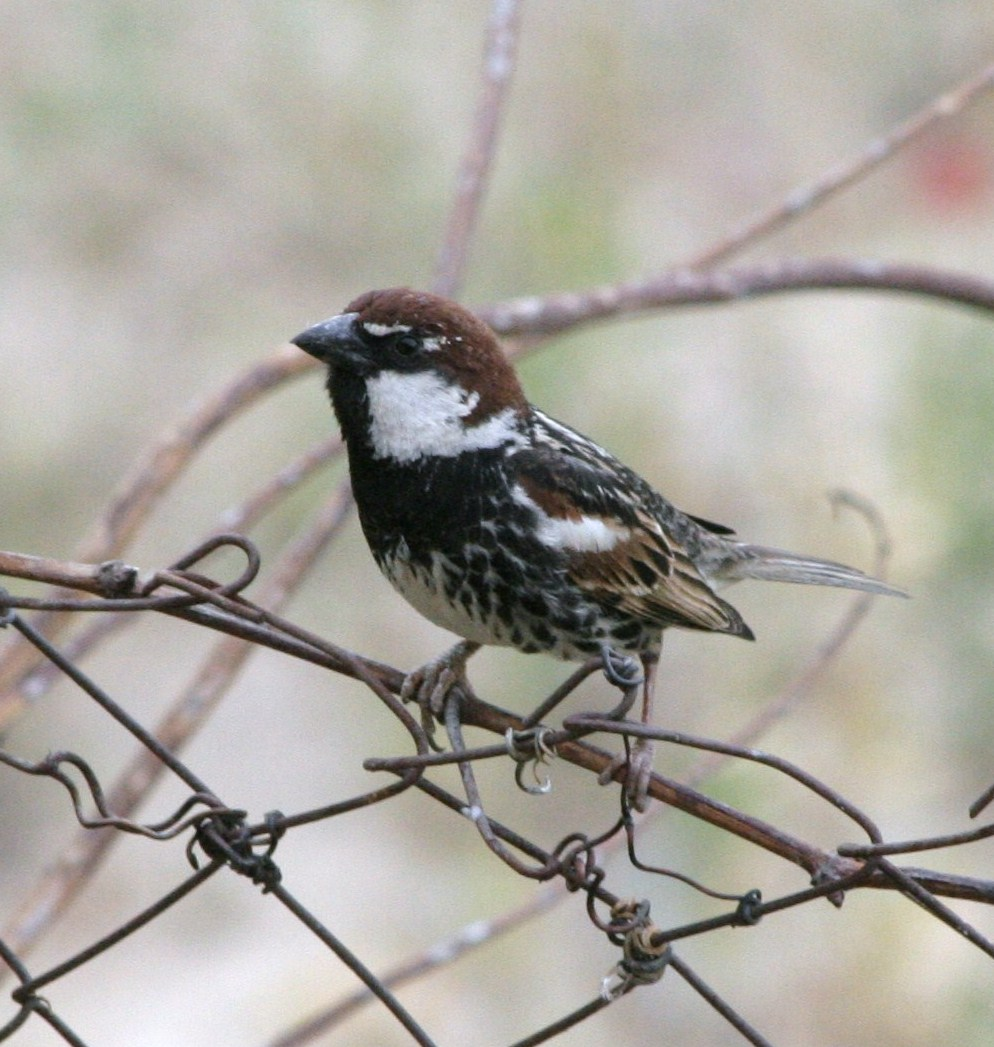
A male in Sardinia

The western subspecies hispaniolensis breeds in parts of Iberia and North Africa, some islands, and the Balkans. In Iberia it is uncommon, occurring in the Tagus valley and sporadically in the northern meseta, the eastern coast, and in the Guadalquivir and Guadiana valleys. While the house sparrow and the Spanish sparrow form a "hybrid swarm" in the eastern half of the Maghreb, they coexist with little hybridisation in the western half. In northern Italy and Corsica, the Spanish sparrow is replaced by the Italian sparrow and the two intergrade in southern Italy, as well as Malta, Crete and nearby islands such as Rhodes. The Spanish sparrow is not known to breed in the Balearic Islands, the Aegean Islands, Corfu or the Peloponnese, but it occurs on Sardinia, Pantelleria and smaller islands near the coast. In the Balkans, it occurs patchily from Montenegro across into the Danube Valley of Romania and northern Serbia. It is found in mainland Greece and Bulgaria, where it is also uncommon.

The Spanish sparrow is likely to have been established on the western Canary Islands for some time, as it was found on Lanzarote when a naturalist first visited the island in 1828. In the 1830s, it was recorded on Fuerteventura, Gran Canaria and Tenerife and since the 1940s it has reached all the other islands. It reached Madeira in May 1935, when numbers of sparrows were found across the island after nine days of strong, continuous easterly winds. It seems to have reached Cape Verde around the same time it reached the Canaries and it was first recorded there on Santiago by Charles Darwin in 1832. From then onwards it reached all the other larger islands, in a poorly recorded extension of its range.

=== Subspecies transcaspicus ===
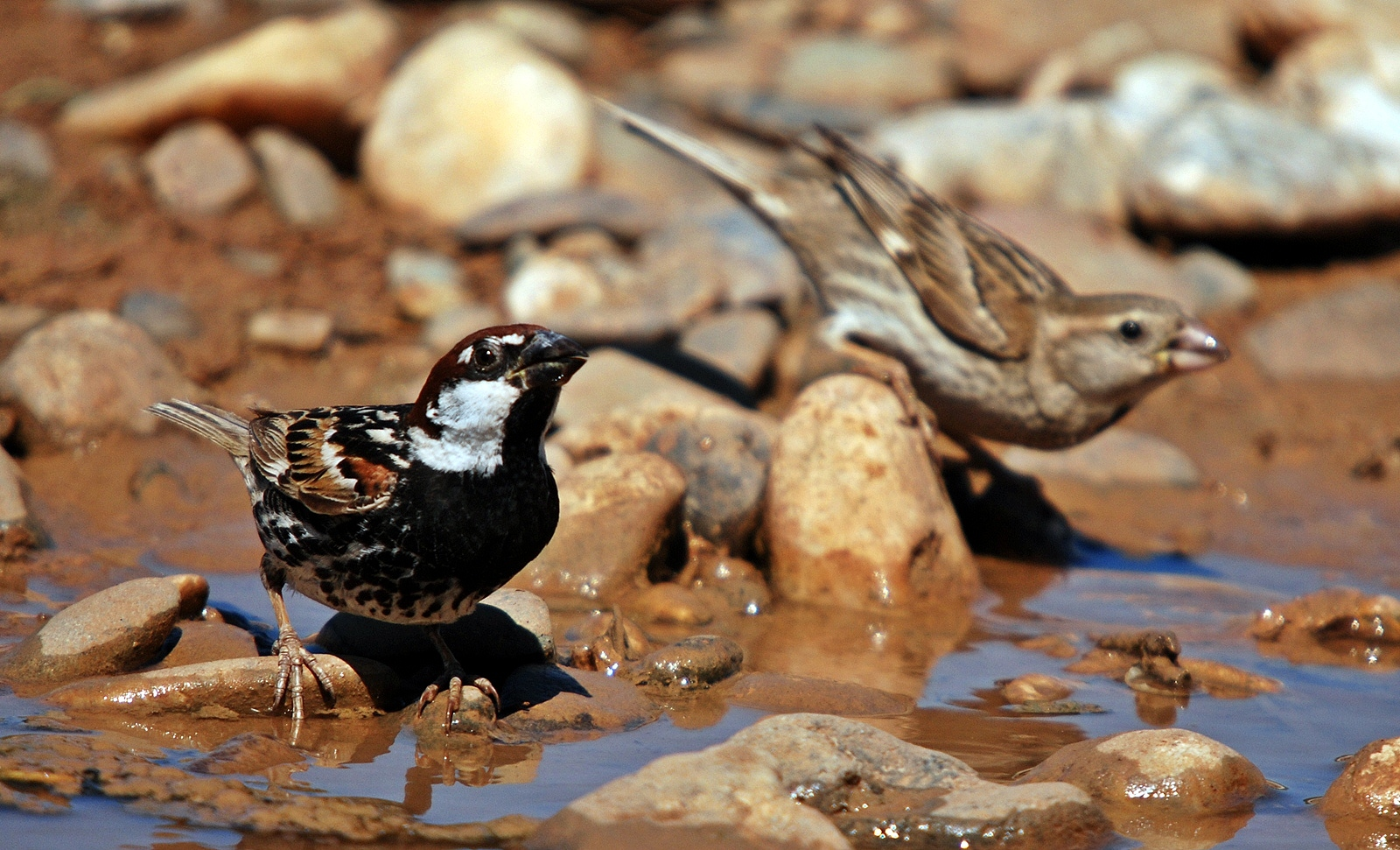
A male and a female of the eastern subspecies (P. h. transcaspicus) in southeastern Turkey

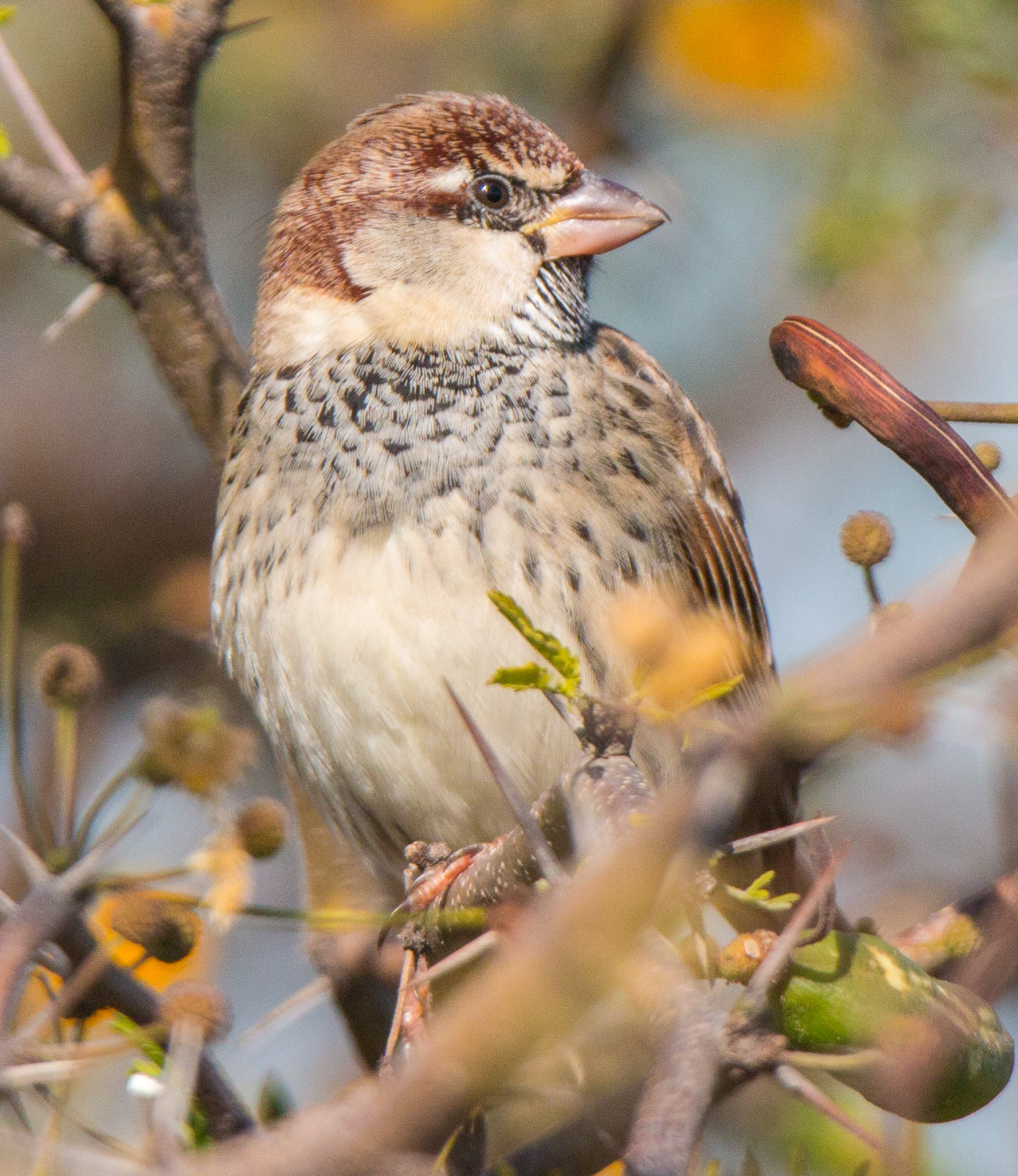
A male of the eastern subspecies (P. h. transcaspicus) in Israel

The eastern subspecies transcaspicus breeds from Anatolia and Cyprus through the Middle East and Central Asia to far western China. In the Middle East, it breeds through Syria and Lebanon to about as far south as Jerusalem. It breeds in eastern Turkey, but is a very rare breeder in Iraq and Kuwait. It breeds sporadically in Azerbaijan and Dagestan, north to the Terek River Valley. In Iran, it breeds in most of the country except the Persian Gulf region, also breeding in central and northern Afghanistan. In Central Asia, it breeds from the regions of the Turkmenistan-Iran and Tajikistan-Afghanistan borders north to parts of the Syr Darya basin in Kazakhstan, and westwards to Lake Alakol, the Karatal River, and a corner of China. Here it has also expanded its range, in the area around Lake Alakol in Kazakhstan, where agriculture was not developed until the 1950s. It winters in the plains of the Indian subcontinent and the Persian Gulf.

=== Habitat ===
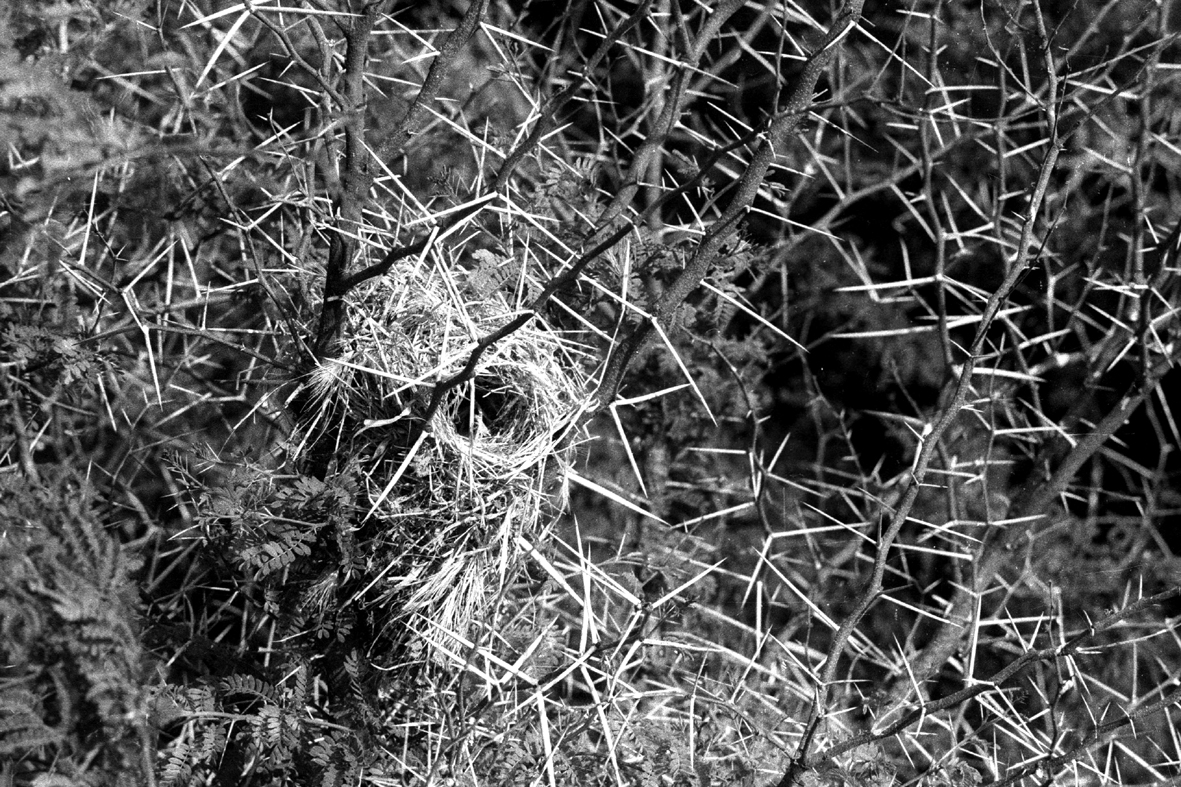
A nest in an acacia hedge in Es Sénia, Algeria

In most of its range, the Spanish sparrow occurs alongside the house sparrow. In such areas, both species breed in farmland and open woodland, with the Spanish sparrow preferring moister habitats. In areas where house sparrows are absent, the Spanish sparrow may live in urban habitats, as in the Canary Islands, Madeira, and some Mediterranean islands. In a few urban areas, such as those in eastern Sardinia, the primary sparrow species is the Eurasian tree sparrow. Before the Spanish sparrow arrived in the Canary Islands and Madeira, the rock sparrow was the sole native sparrow. In the Canaries, the Spanish sparrow occurs in most habitats, having ousted the rock sparrow from all but the driest localities. In Madeira the Spanish sparrow is common in cultivated areas, but it has not fully adapted to nesting in buildings or breeding in the drier north of the island. The Spanish sparrow is not common on most of the Cape Verde islands, due to the presence of the endemic Iago sparrow, and the house sparrow on São Vicente. On Fogo, where it is the sole species of sparrow, it is common in all habitats, breeding both in the houses of São Filipe and on the cliff walls of the volcano Pico do Fogo.

== Behaviour and ecology ==
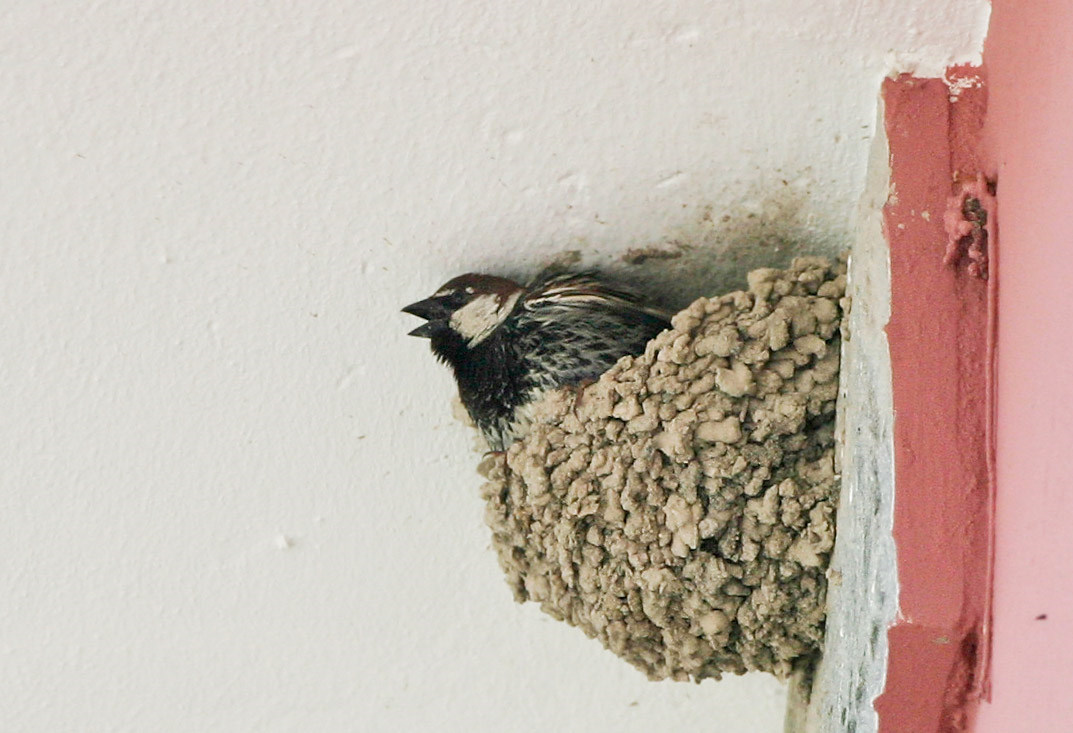
A male in a nest in Lesbos, Greece

The Spanish sparrow is strongly gregarious, flocking and breeding in groups. In the winter, it mostly wanders nomadically or makes regular migrations.

Little is known of the Spanish sparrow's survival rate, and the maximum age recorded is 11 years.

=== Feeding ===
Like other sparrows, it feeds principally on the seeds of grains and other grasses, also eating leaves, fruits, and other plant materials. Young birds are fed mostly on insects, and adults also feed on insects and other animals during and before the breeding season. Nestlings are fed almost exclusively on insects for their first few days, and are gradually fed larger amounts of grains. The portion of insects in nestling diets is recorded at a range from 75 to over 90 percent. In preying on insects, the Spanish sparrow is opportunistic, feeding on whichever insects are most common. In Central Asia, these are caterpillars, ants, grasshoppers, and crickets. While migrating through Central Asia in the spring, the Spanish sparrow feeds mostly on crops in cultivated areas, and while breeding it feeds mostly on insects, wild plants, and seeds from the previous year.

=== Breeding ===
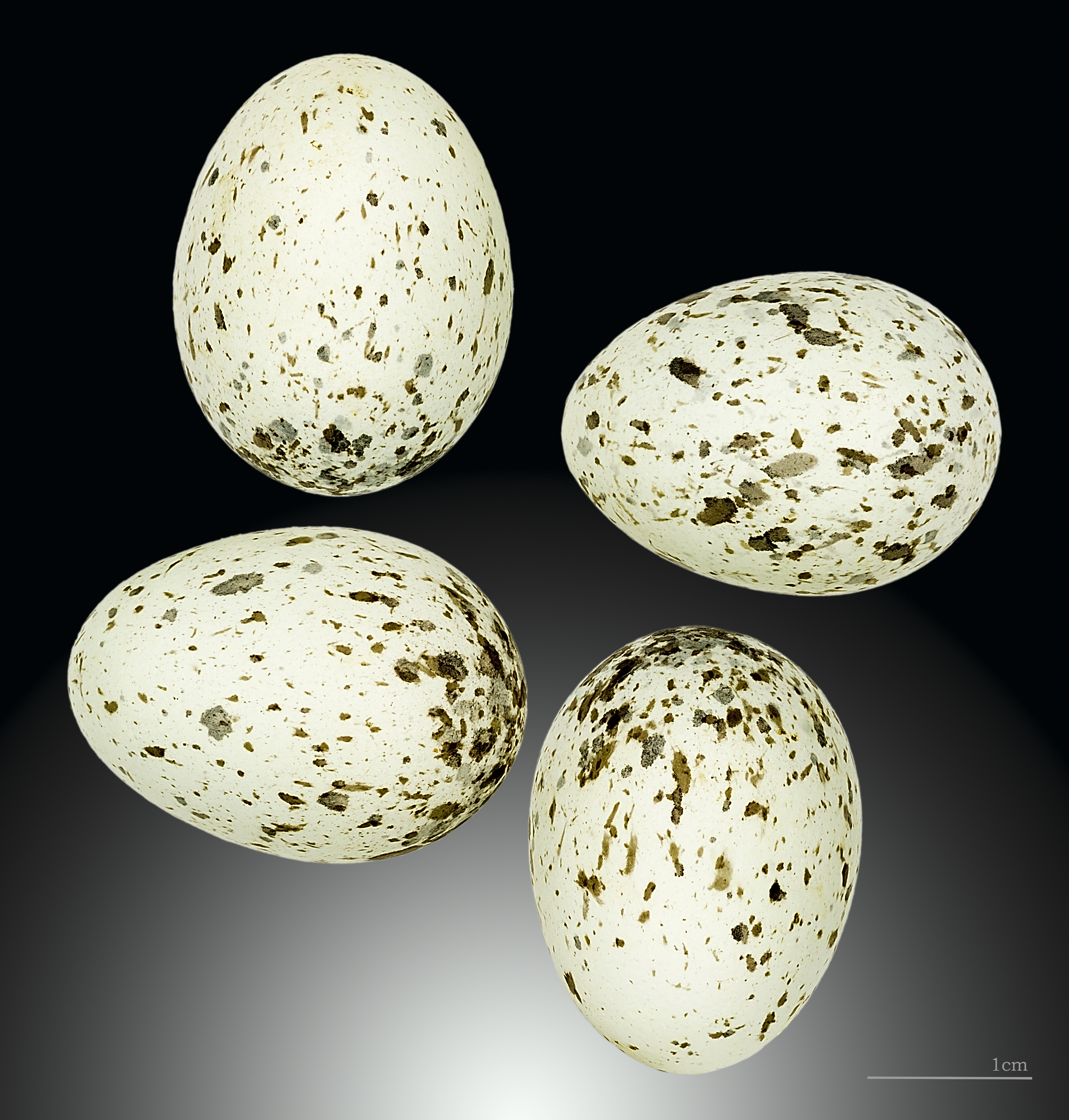
Eggs

The Spanish sparrow nests in large colonies of closely spaced or even multiple shared nests. Nests are usually placed in trees or bushes, amongst branches or underneath the nests of larger birds such as white storks. Colonies may hold from ten pairs to hundreds of thousands of pairs. Each pair lays 3–8 eggs, which hatch in 12 days, with the chicks fledging when about 14 days old. Males spend more time constructing nests than females.

== Status ==
The European population of the Spanish sparrow comprises between 2,800,000 and 6,200,000 breeding pairs or 8,400,000–18,600,000 individuals. Partly from the European population, the global population is estimated to be between 17 and 74 million individuals. There have been population decreases in some parts of Europe, but in other areas the population has increased and the species is not seriously threatened, so it is assessed as least concern on the IUCN Red List.
