= Ilhéu Raso =

Island of Cape Verde

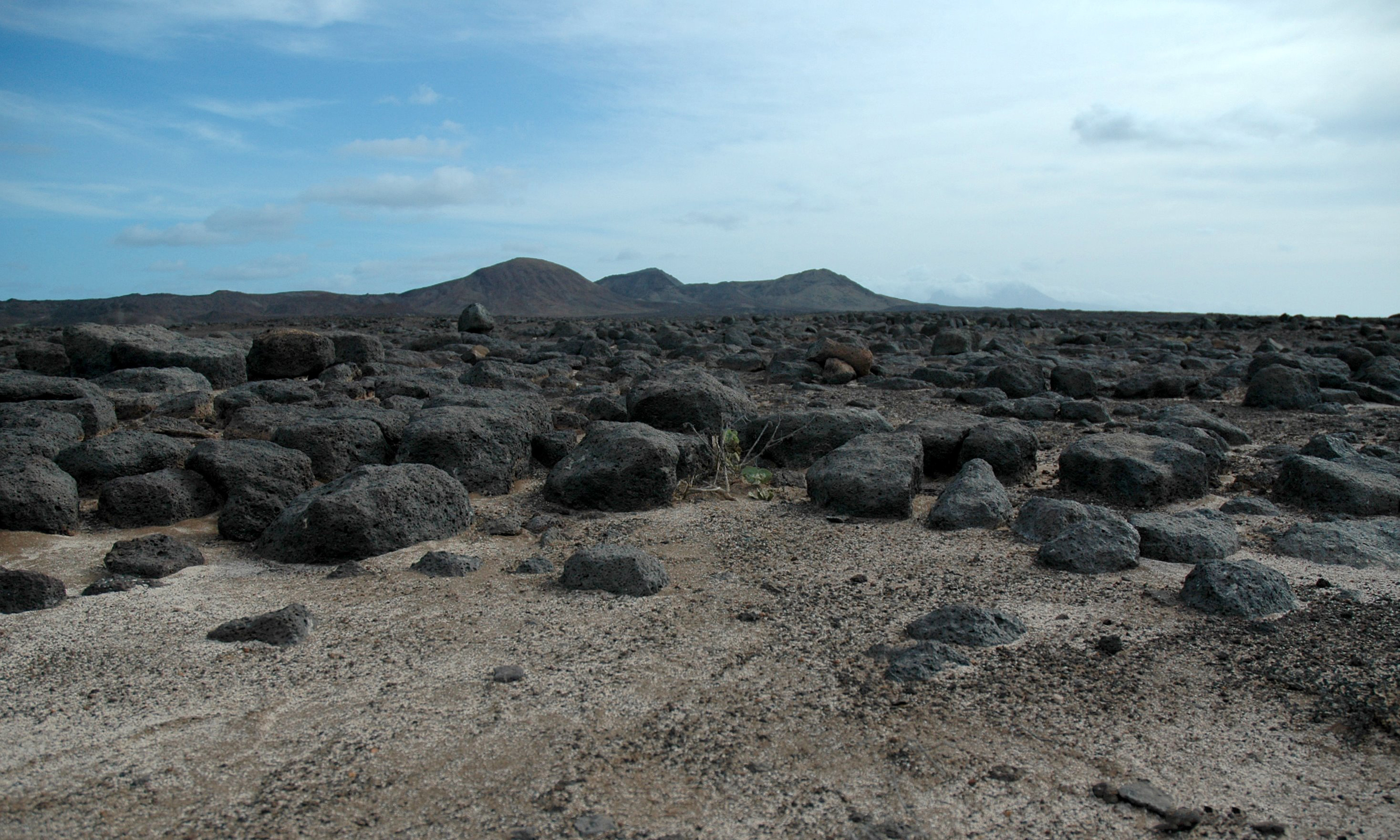
- Raso landscape

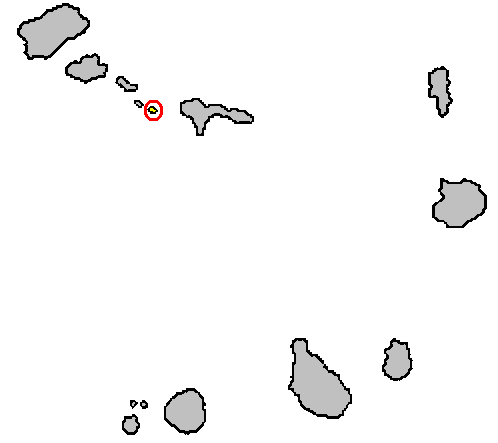

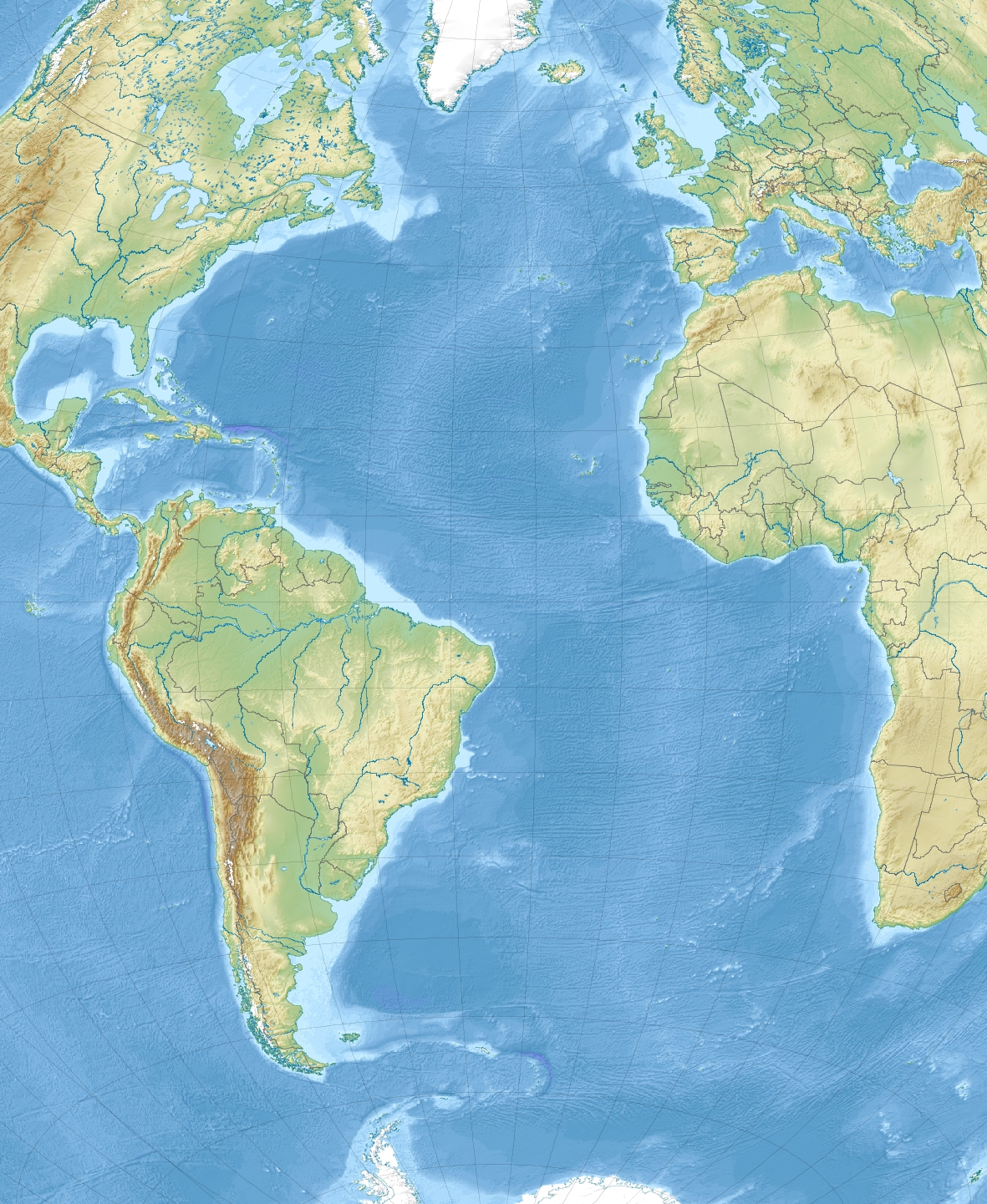
- Location within Cape Verde Location within Atlantic Ocean

Geography
- Location: Atlantic Ocean
- Coordinates: 16°37′0″N 24°35′57″W
- Archipelago: Cape Verde
- Area: 5.76 km^{2} (2.22 sq mi)
- Length: 3.6 km (2.24 mi)
- Width: 2.8 km (1.74 mi)
- Highest elevation: 164 m (538 ft)

Administration
- Cape Verde

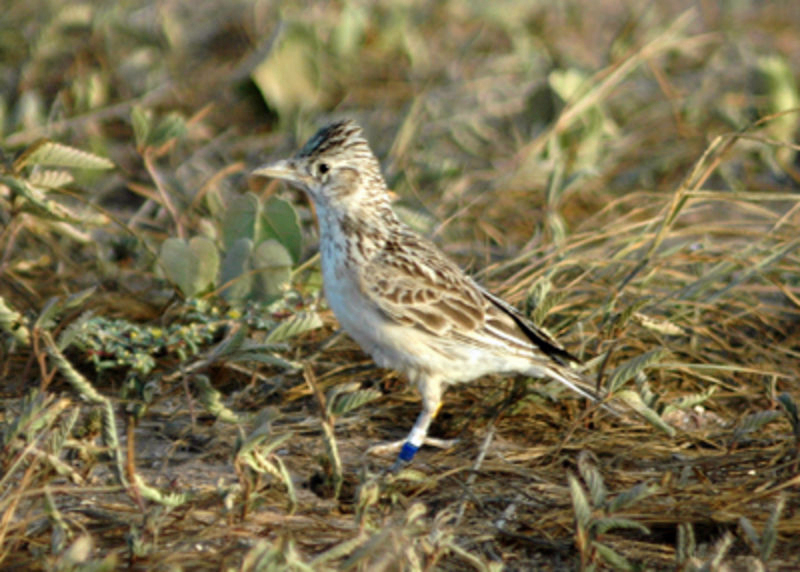
Raso Lark

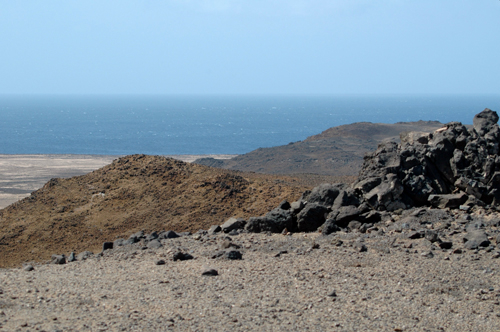
Northern part of Raso

Ilhéu Raso is an uninhabited volcanic island of 5.76 square kilometres (2.22 square miles) in the Barlavento archipelago of Cape Verde. It is flanked by the smaller Branco islet to the west and by São Nicolau island on its eastern side. The distance from the island of São Nicolau is 15 kilometres (9.3 miles). Together with Santa Luzia and Ilhéu Branco, Ilhéu Raso is on the tentative list of UNESCO's World Heritage Sites. Since 1990, the islet is part of the protected area Reserva Natural Integral de Santa Luzia.

The island is 3.6 kilometres (2.2 miles) long by 2.8 kilometres (1.7 miles) wide, Its highest point is Monte da Ribeira Ladrão, elevation 164 metres (538 feet) above sea level. The south-western part is a dry, boulder-strewn plain. There is little vegetation apart from an area of grassland in the south-west. The entire coastline consists of rocky cliffs.

== Fauna ==
Raso is now the only home of the critically endangered Raso lark (about 45 pairs). The island has been identified as an Important Bird Area (IBA) by BirdLife International because, as well as the larks, it supports populations of Cape Verde shearwaters (with an estimated 2500–3750 breeding pairs), red-billed tropicbirds (25–40 pairs), Cape Verde barn owls and Iago sparrows, others include Oceanodroma castro. It is one of only two islands where the extinct Cape Verde giant skink has been recorded. The giant wall gecko (Tarentola gigas) and a skink (Mabuya stangeri) still occur.
