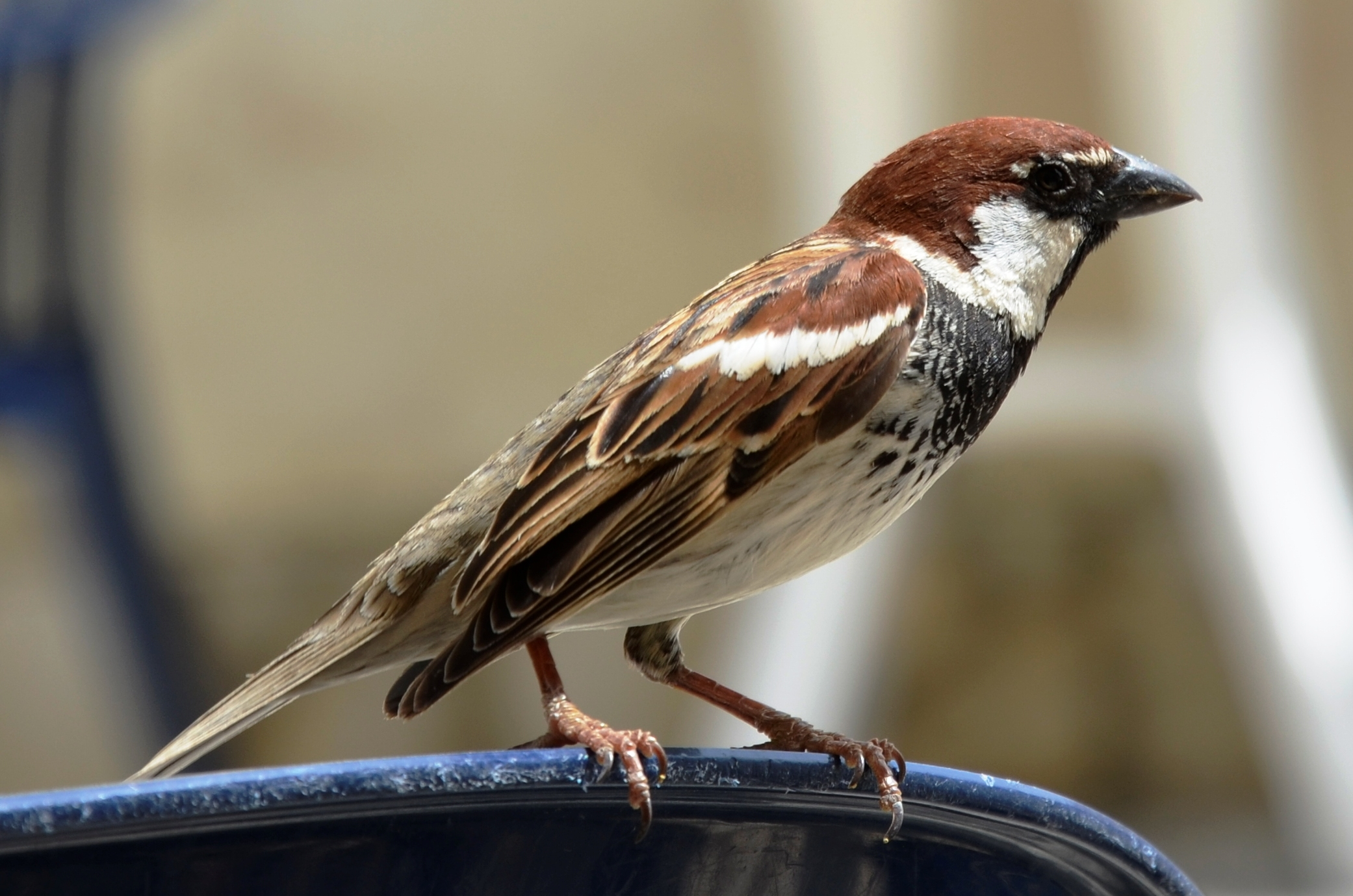
- Male in Sicily

Conservation status
- Vulnerable (IUCN 3.1)

Scientific classification
- Kingdom: Animalia
- Phylum: Chordata
- Class: Aves
- Order: Passeriformes
- Family: Passeridae
- Genus: Passer
- Species: P. italiae

Binomial name
- Passer italiae (Vieillot, 1817)
- Range of P. italiae Resident

Synonyms
- List: Fringilla italiae Vieillot, 1817; Fringilla cisalpina Temminck, 1820; Pyrgita cisalpina (Temminck, 1820) Gould, 1830; Passer domesticus cisalpinus (Temminck, 1820) Schegel, 1844

= Italian sparrow =

Species of bird

The Italian sparrow (Passer italiae), also known as the cisalpine sparrow, is a passerine bird of the sparrow family Passeridae, found in Italy and other parts of the Mediterranean region. In appearance, it is intermediate between the house sparrow, and the Spanish sparrow, a species of the Mediterranean and Central Asia closely related to the house sparrow. The Italian sparrow occurs in northern Italy and neighbouring regions, with intermediates with the house sparrow in a very narrow contact zone in the Alps, a slow gradation in appearance from the Italian to Spanish sparrows across central and southern Italy, and more birds of intermediate appearance in Malta, Crete, and other parts of the Mediterranean.

There has been much debate on the origins and taxonomic status of the Italian sparrow, especially given its possible hybrid origin. Some have classified it as a subspecies of the house sparrow, a subspecies of the Spanish sparrow, or as a separate species, a treatment followed if only for convenience by authorities such as the Handbook of the Birds of the World. A DNA analysis by Glenn-Peter Sætre and colleagues published in 2011 indicated an origin of the Italian sparrow through hybridisation between the Spanish and house sparrows, and Sætre and colleagues argued that given its origins and the limited extent of hybridisation, the treatment as a distinct species was supported. The Italian sparrow is unofficially considered the national bird of Italy.

== Description ==
The Italian sparrow is a small chunky bird, with grey and brown plumage. The sexes differ in their plumage pattern, and slightly in length. The male has a head patterned like that of the Spanish sparrow, with a chestnut crown, nape and sides of head, and white cheeks. The male's upperparts are bright chestnut, and its underparts are pale grey, lacking the black streaking of the Spanish sparrow. The male has a black patch on its throat and chest, known as a bib or badge. This patch, like much of the male's plumage is dull in fresh non-breeding plumage and is brightened by wear and preening. The female is nearly identical to the female house sparrow, but it differs from the female Spanish sparrow in its lack of black streaks on the underparts. Albinism is occasionally recorded.

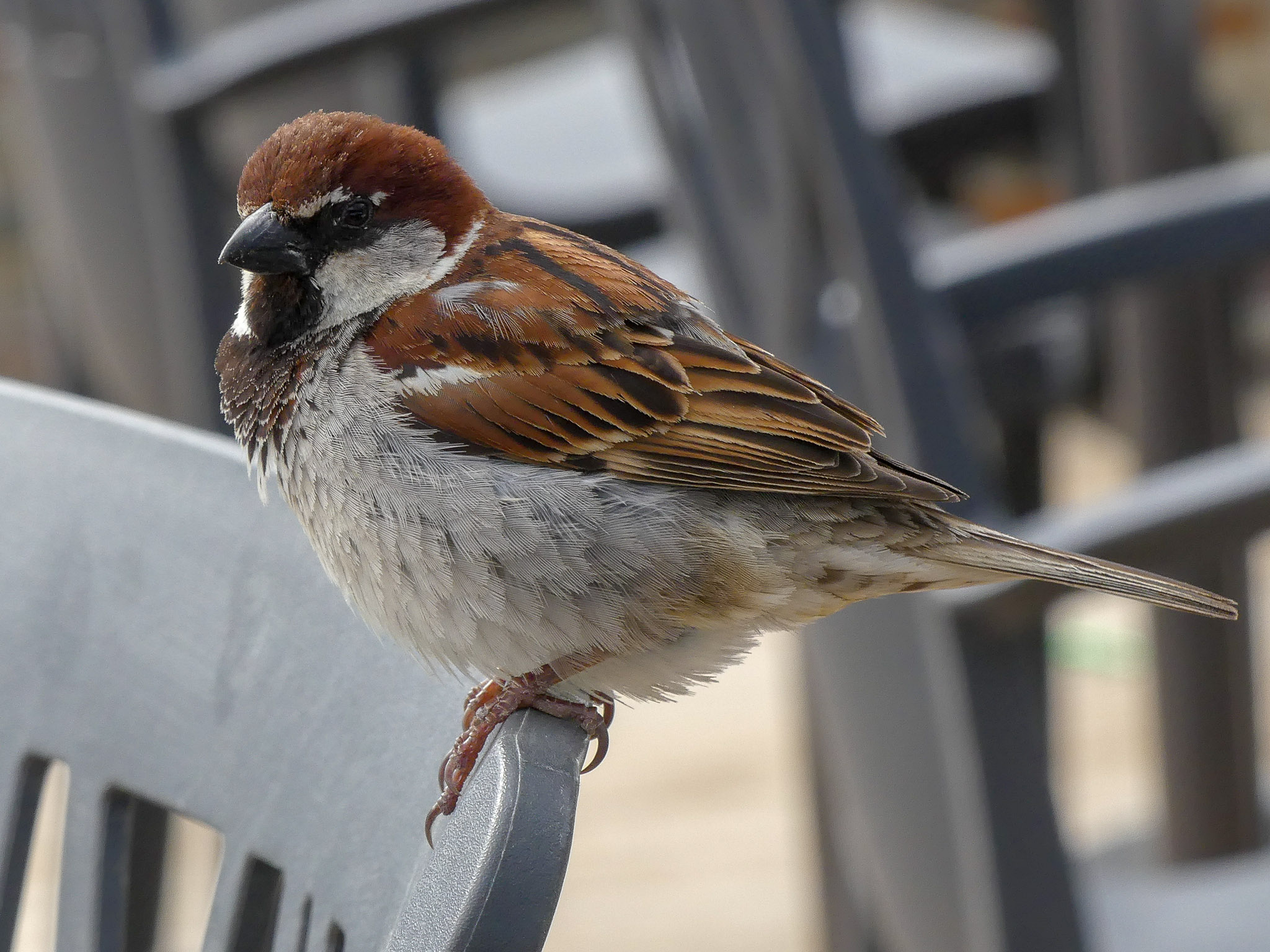
Male in Corsica (France)

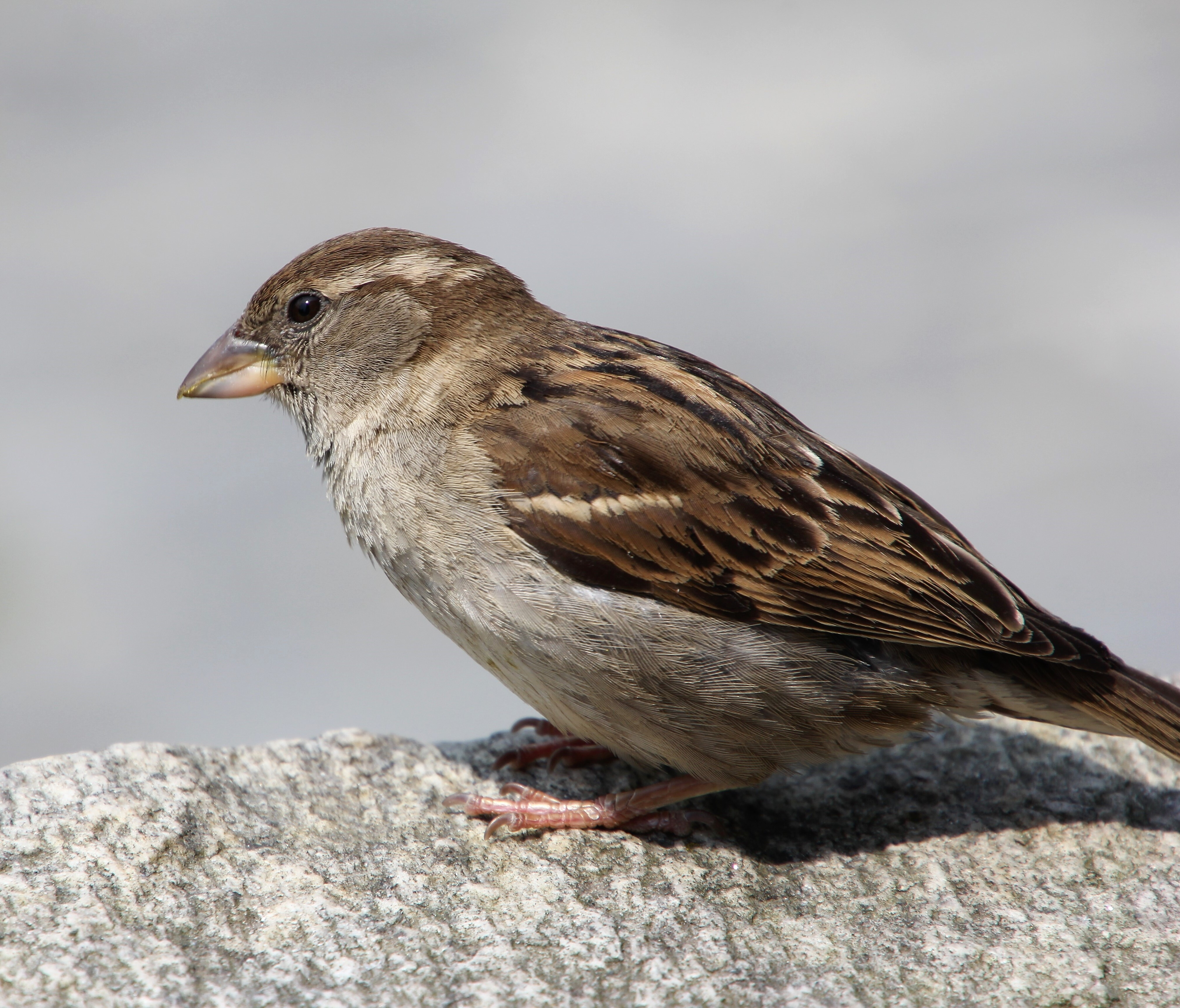
Female in Piedmont (Italy)

The Italian sparrow is about the same size as the house sparrow at 14–16 centimetres (5.5–6.3 in) in length. The tail is 5.3–6 centimetres (2.1–2.4 in), the tarsus 18.6–21 millimetres (0.73–0.83 in), and wing lengths for males are 7.3–8.2 centimetres (2.9–3.2 in). The Italian sparrow's weight varies seasonally from 30 grams (1.1 oz) in the winter to 26 grams (0.92 oz) in the summer.

The vocalisations of the Italian sparrow are similar to those of both the Spanish sparrow and the house sparrow. Its vocalisations carry better in natural environments than those of the house sparrow. The male gives a chreep call like that of the Spanish sparrow to proclaim nest ownership, and a faster version of this as part of courtship display. Male song patterns grade slowly into those of the Spanish sparrow across southern Italy, but in the area of overlap between the house and Italian sparrows, the two birds sound alike.

== Taxonomy ==
The taxonomic status of the Italian sparrow has been a matter of debate. It has been variously regarded as a stable hybrid between the house sparrow and Spanish sparrow, or as a subspecies of either the house or Spanish sparrow. Many authorities, including the Handbook of the Birds of the World, recognise it as a separate species, if only for convenience. Others, including many conservation groups, consider the Italian sparrow a simple hybrid and ignore it. The chromosomes of Italian sparrows are distinct from those of the house sparrow, but mitochondrial DNA suggest a close relation to the house sparrow.

A DNA analysis by Jo Hermansen, Glenn-Peter Sætre, and a group of other scientists from Norway published in Molecular Ecology in 2011 indicates that the Italian sparrow originated as a hybrid between house and Spanish sparrows. It has mitochondrial DNA from both parent species. Additionally, it is now breeding beside the Spanish sparrow without cross-breeding in areas where the species both occur. Although it hybridises with the house sparrow in a sparsely populated contact zone in the Alps, the contact zone is characterized by relatively abrupt changes in species-specific male plumage, suggesting that partial reproductive isolation based on plumage may also have developed between these two taxa. As a genetically distinct group that is reproductively isolated from the parental species, it must be recognised as a separate species, according to Hermansen and colleagues.

== Distribution and habitat ==
The Italian sparrow is found in northern and central Italy, Corsica, and small parts of France, Switzerland, Austria, and Slovenia. Its distribution was described by Italian zoologist Enrico Hillyer Giglioli in 1881 as professing "'Conservative opinions'; for it keeps strictly within our current political frontiers". At the northernmost edge of its range in the southern Alps, there is a narrow hybrid zone about 20–30 km (12–19 mi) wide with the house sparrow. In southern Italy, there is a gradual clinal trend with the Spanish sparrow, with birds increasing in their similarity to the Spanish sparrow in appearance and ecology further south, from around Naples to western Sicily, where birds resemble pure Spanish sparrows. However, this trend may be superficial, and the Handbook of the Birds of the World recognises birds from Sicily and Crete as Italian sparrows.

Sardinia is occupied by Spanish sparrows, while sparrows on Malta, Crete, and the adjacent islands are intermediates similar to the Italian sparrow. On Malta, sparrows resemble the Spanish sparrow, with urban birds behaving much like the house sparrow, and rural birds like the Spanish sparrow. The situation is complicated by house and Spanish sparrows which winter and migrate on Malta. A more complex situation occurs in parts of northern Africa, where a highly variable mixed, interbreeding population of house sparrows and Spanish sparrows occurs. This hybrid swarm shows a full range of characters from nearly pure house sparrows to nearly pure Spanish sparrows and everything between.

The Italian sparrow is associated with human habitations, inhabiting towns, cities, and agricultural areas. In most cities in Italy, it shares the urban environment with the Eurasian tree sparrow, and in some parts of Naples, it is replaced entirely by this species.

The Italian sparrow's breeding population is believed to comprise 5 to 10 million pairs, 750,000 to 900,000 of which are estimated to live in urban areas. It has a population density of 58 to 160 pairs per square kilometer. Up to the mid-1990s, its population increased steadily, probably due to increased urbanisation. Between 2000 and 2005, the Italian sparrow's population in Italy declined by 27.1 percent, mirroring the declines of the house sparrow throughout Europe. From 1998 to 2008, urban populations declined by about 50 percent. A study of the Italian sparrow's status listed a large number of potential causes for the Italian sparrow's decline, including shortages of insect food, agricultural intensification, and reductions of green areas. The Italian sparrow is among the most common birds in Italian cities, but other species, including the European goldfinch, are more common.

== Behaviour ==
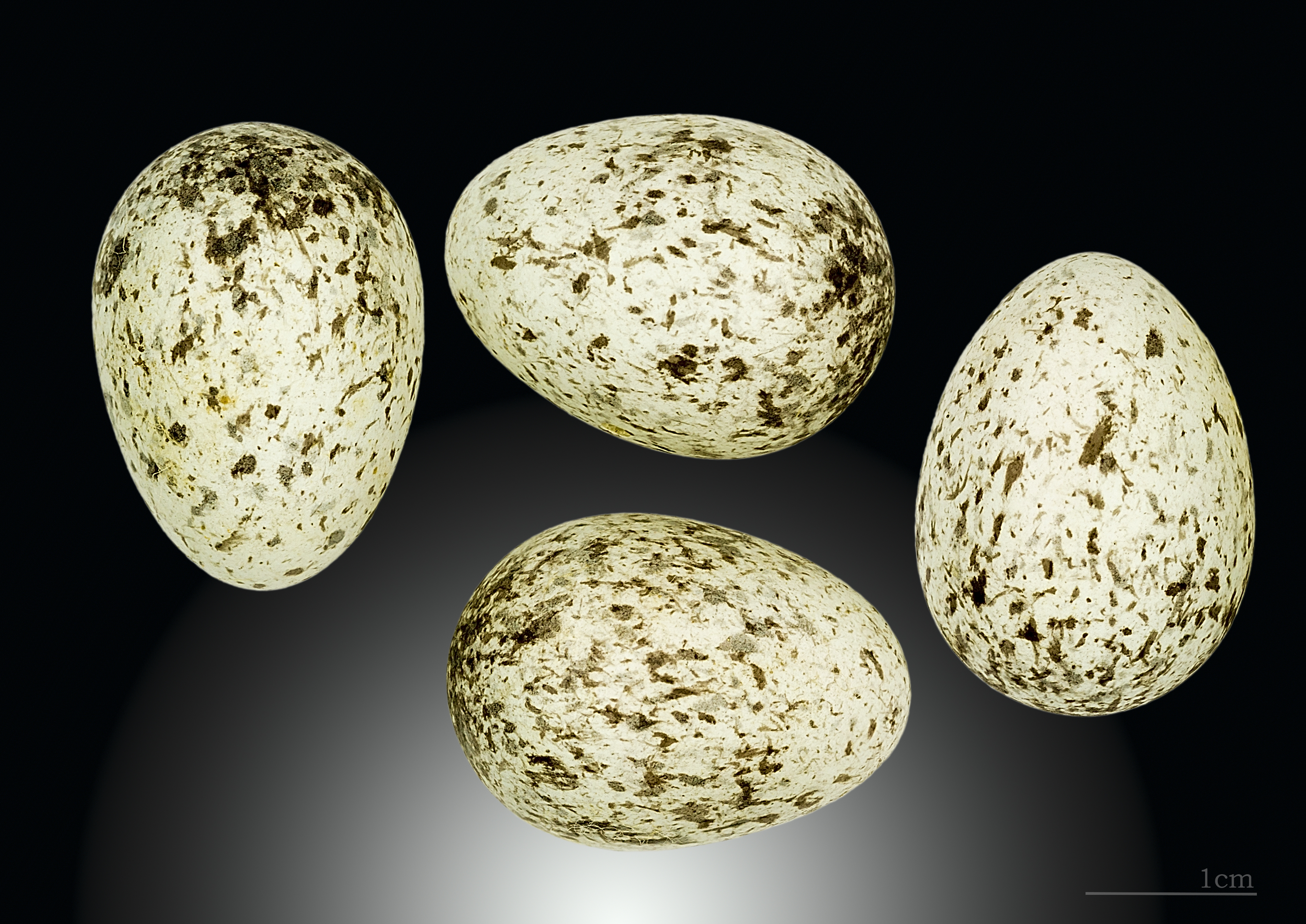
Eggs

The Italian sparrow's behaviour is similar in many ways to that of the house sparrow. It is a social bird, which feeds mostly on seeds and insects.

It is mostly sedentary, but it wanders to some extent outside its breeding season. These wanderings are mostly local, but they may extend into southern France. Similarly, the house sparrow sometimes occurs as a winter visitor in northern Italy.

Besides intergrading with the Spanish and house sparrows, the Italian sparrow has been recorded hybridising with the Eurasian tree sparrow. The eggs of the Italian sparrow do not seem to differ from those of the house sparrow. Broods may contain two to eight eggs, with an average of about 5.2.

== Relationships with humans ==
In most of its range, the Italian sparrow is an abundant and familiar bird of houses. It has been one of the wild birds most commonly consumed as food in Italy. Portrayals of the Italian sparrow or one of its relatives have been found at Pompeii. Like the house sparrow, the Italian sparrow is considered a biological indicator of pollution.

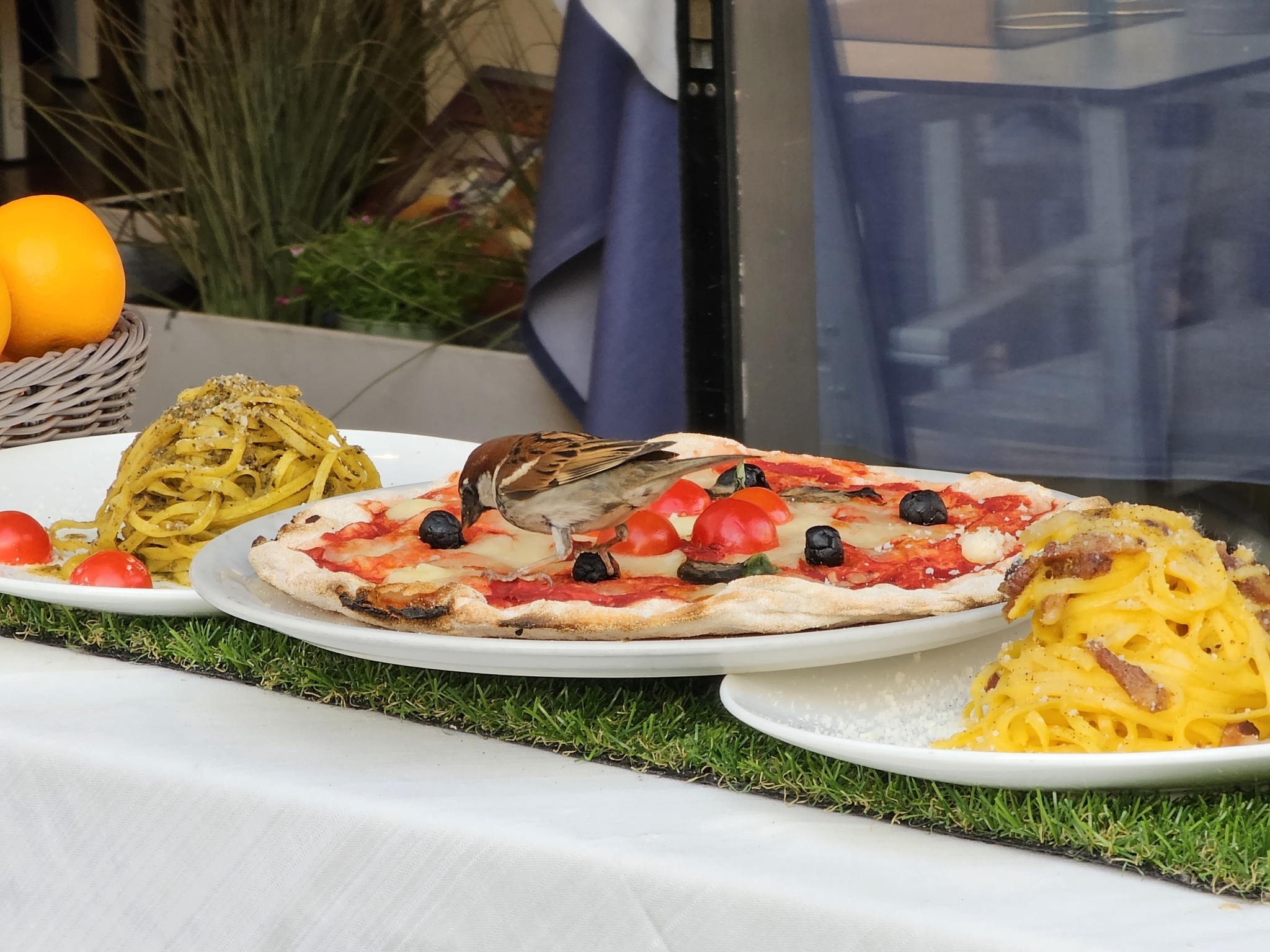
Italian sparrow eating pizza, in Rome

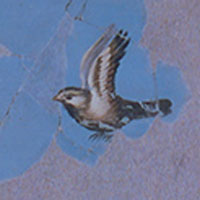
A fresco at Pompeii depicting an Italian sparrow or a relative
