= Ilhéu Branco =

Island of Cape Verde

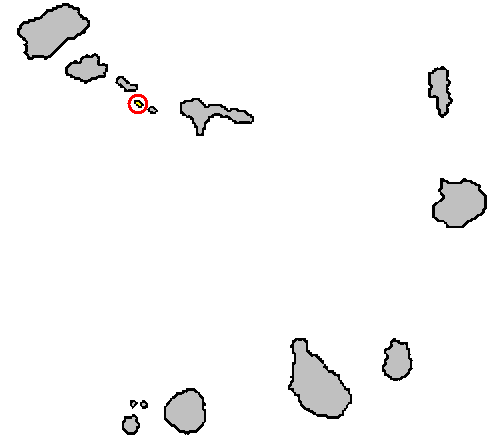
- Map of the Cape Verde archipelago showing the position of Branco

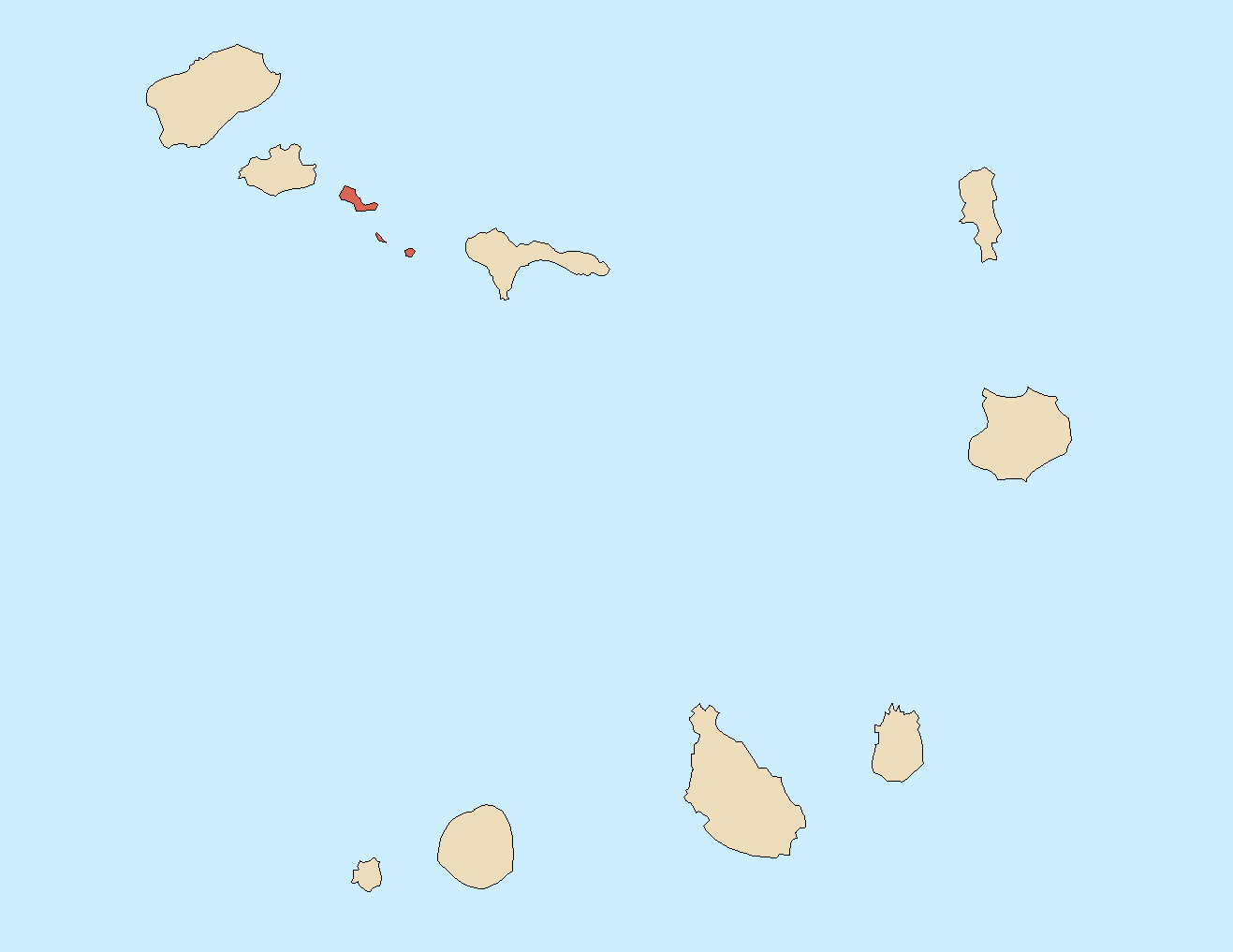

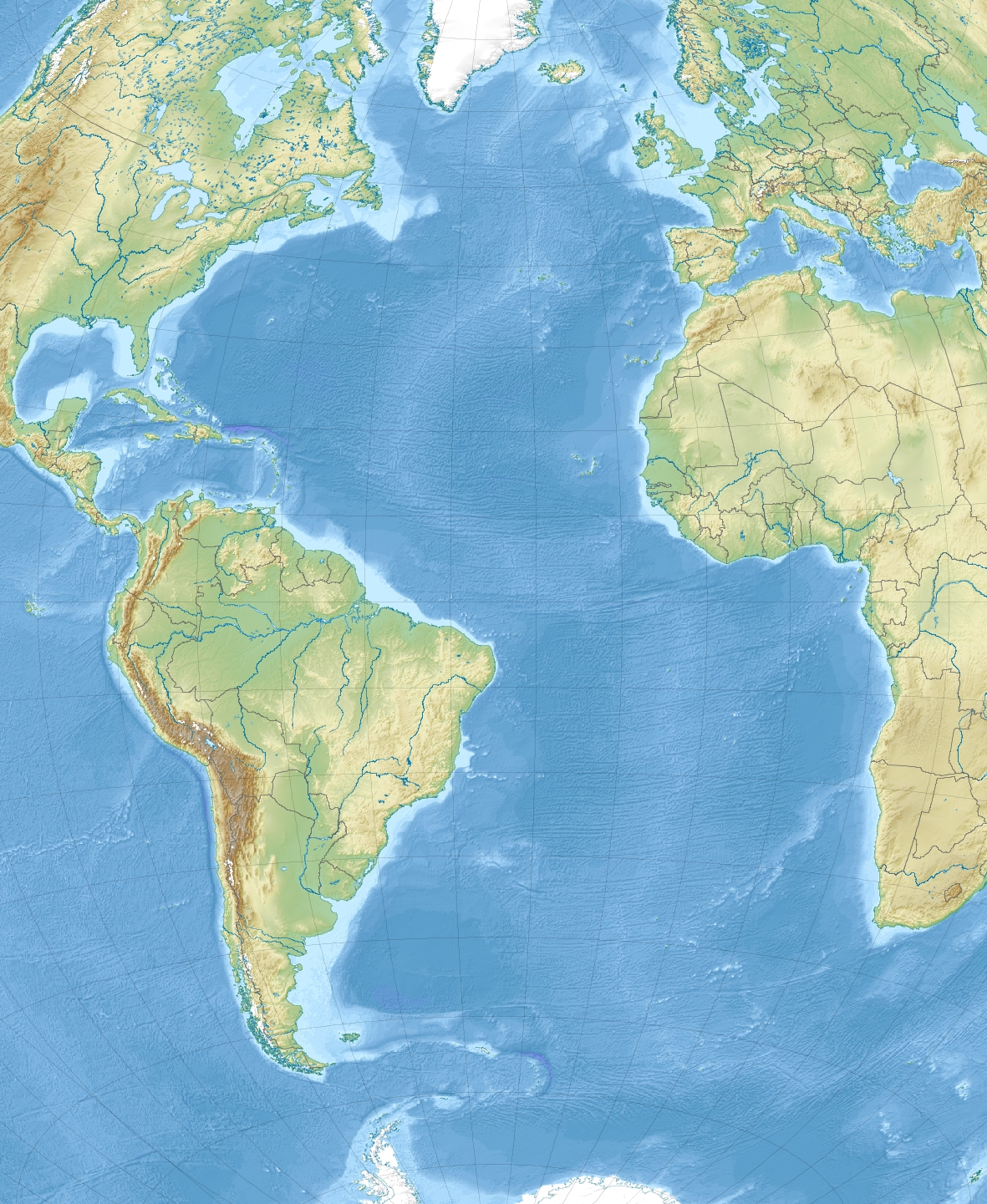
- Location within Cape Verde Location within Atlantic Ocean

Geography
- Location: Atlantic Ocean
- Coordinates: 16.658056°N 24.669722°W
- Archipelago: Cape Verde
- Area: 2.78 km^{2} (1.07 sq mi)
- Length: 3.6 km (2.24 mi)
- Width: 1.4 km (0.87 mi)
- Highest elevation: 327 m (1073 ft)

Administration
- Cape Verde

Ilhéu Branco (Portuguese for "white islet") is an uninhabited 278-hectare (690-acre) islet in the Barlavento group of the Cape Verde archipelago off the coast of north-west Africa in the Atlantic Ocean. Ilhéu Branco is flanked by the islands of Santa Luzia to the north-west and Ilhéu Raso to the south-east. Since 1990, the islet is part of the protected area Reserva Natural Integral de Santa Luzia. Together with Santa Luzia and Ilhéu Raso, Ilhéu Branco is on the tentative list of UNESCO's World Heritage Sites.

Branco is a large rectangular rock, less than 4 km long by more than 1 km wide, rising steeply to a ridge running the length of the island. Its highest point, Topa da Berta, is 327 metres (1,073 feet) above sea level. Its summit is lower than that of Santa Luzia but higher than Raso. The coast is rocky, except for an area of dunes on the west side and a small area of level ground on the east side. Seas around the island are rough throughout the year, making access difficult.

== Fauna ==
The Cape Verde giant skink, which only occurred on Branco and Raso, has not been seen since the early twentieth century and is considered extinct. It is thought to have been wiped out through over-exploitation by humans for its skin and for food. The giant wall gecko (Tarentola gigas) is still present. The island has been identified as an Important Bird Area (IBA) by BirdLife International because it supports 2500–3570 breeding pairs of Cape Verde shearwaters as well as peregrine falcons, Iago sparrows and Cape Verde barn owls (Tyto alba detorta).
