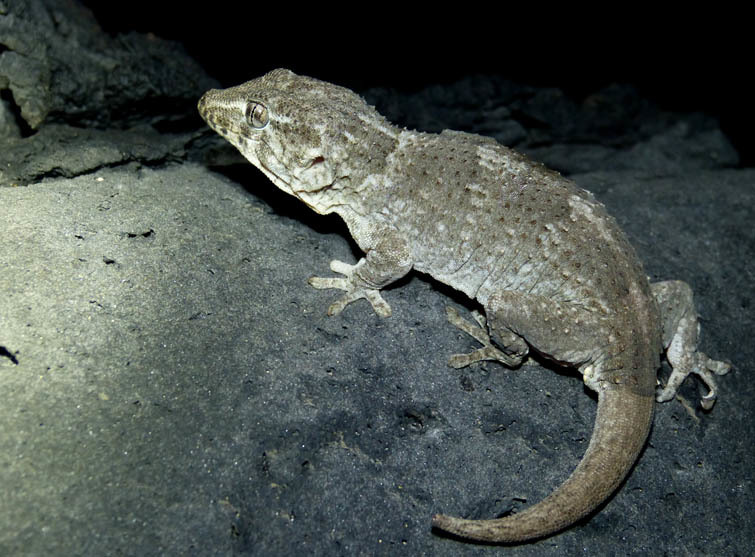
- T. gigas brancoensis in Cape Verde

Conservation status
- Endangered (IUCN 3.1)

Scientific classification
- Kingdom: Animalia
- Phylum: Chordata
- Class: Reptilia
- Order: Squamata
- Suborder: Gekkota
- Family: Phyllodactylidae
- Genus: Tarentola
- Species: T. gigas

Binomial name
- Tarentola gigas (Bocage, 1875)

Subspecies
- Tarentola gigas brancoensis Schleich, 1984; Tarentola gigas gigas Bocage, 1875

Synonyms
- Ascalabotes gigas Bocage, 1875; Platydactylus gigas (Bocage, 1875); Tarentola delalandii gigas (Bocage, 1875)

= Giant wall gecko =

Species of lizard

The giant wall gecko (Tarentola gigas) is a species of lizard in the family Phyllodactylidae. The species is endemic to Cape Verde. There are two recognized subspecies.

== Taxonomy ==
The giant wall gecko was originally described and named Ascalabotes gigas by Portuguese zoologist José Vicente Barbosa du Bocage in 1875.

== Subspecies ==
Two subspecies, including the nominotypical subspecies, are recognized as being valid.

- Tarentola gigas brancoensis Schleich, 1984
- Tarentola gigas gigas Bocage, 1875

== Description ==
The giant wall gecko reaches a maximum snout-to-vent length of 15.5 cm (6.1 in). Its dorsal skin has a grey color. It is one of the largest geckos in the world.

== Geographic distribution ==
Tarentola gigas is endemic to Cape Verde, where it occurs on the island of São Nicolau and on the nearby islets of Branco and Raso.

Before human settlement to Cape Verde, the giant wall gecko also occurred on São Vicente and Santa Luzia.

== Behavior ==
The giant wall gecko is nocturnal.

== Diet ==
Both subspecies of Tarentola gigas have a generalist diet, feeding on a variety of plants, vertebrates, and invertebrates (such as Coleoptera, Diptera, and more) available within their trophic environment.

== Conservation status ==
The giant wall gecko is listed as threatened because of the reduction of its range, and the decrease in the species it preys on.
