= Evolutionary trap =

Case in which an evolved trait becomes maladaptive

The term evolutionary trap has retained several definitions associated with different biological disciplines.

== Evolutionary biology ==
Within evolutionary biology, this term has been used sporadically to refer to situations in which a pre-existing (and presumably well adapted and successful) trait has become obsolete or maladaptive (evolutionary mismatch) due to changing biophysical or social environments but evolved complex behavioral decision-making rules ("Darwinian algorithms") accumulated by prior adaptations now preclude any effective re-adaptation — as organisms can only modify upon or "patch up" existing traits (which essentially have become inherited "baggage") rather than devolving, removing or "redesigning" a trait (per Dollo's law of irreversibility) — leaving the species hosting the trait struggling to keep up with natural selection and thus vulnerable to competitive disadvantage, extirpation or even extinction.

In the 1991 BBC lecture series Growing Up in the Universe, British evolutionary biologist Richard Dawkins once analogized the concept to that of a mountaineer blindly climbing up (because "evolution has no foresights") while not allowed to turn back downhill, ending up being trapped on one summit and thus cannot go any higher.

== Ecology ==
Within behavioral and ecological sciences, evolutionary traps occur when rapid environmental change triggers organisms to make maladaptive behavioral decisions. Organisms are prone to make inappropriate choices when an environment changes suddenly because the evolved Darwinian algorithms (decision rules) that underlie behavioral choices are only as complex as is necessary to yield adaptive outcomes under normal circumstances, and not so complex as to cover unforeseen experimentally- or human-created contingencies. An evolutionary trap occurs in any situation where a sudden anthropogenic change in the environment causes an organism to make a decision that normally (in the environment in which the organism evolved) would have been adaptive, but now results in a maladaptive outcome, although better alternatives are still available.

Evolutionary traps may take place within any type of behavioral context (e.g. mate selection, food choice, timing of migration and breeding, nest-site selection). Witherington demonstrates an interesting case of a "navigational trap". Over evolutionary time, hatchling sea turtles have evolved the tendency to migrate toward the light of the moon upon emerging from their sand nests. However, in the modern world, this has resulted in them tending to orient towards bright beach-front lighting, which is a more intense light source than the moon. As a result, the hatchlings migrate up the beach and away from the ocean where they exhaust themselves, desiccate and die either as a result of exhaustion, dehydration or predation.

The most empirically and theoretically well-understood type of evolutionary trap is the ecological trap which represents maladaptive habitat selection behavior. Habitat selection is an extremely important process in the lifespan of most organisms. That choice affects nearly all of an individual's subsequent choices, so it may not be particularly surprising the type of evolutionary trap with the best empirical support is the ecological trap.

Ecological and evolutionary traps are relatively difficult to detect, and so the small number of demonstrated cases may be the result of a paucity of researchers looking for them coupled with the demanding evidence required to demonstrate their existence.

== See also ==
- Coextinction
- Devolution (biology)
- Ecological trap
- Evolutionary anachronism
- Evolutionary tradeoff
- Mass extinction
- Perceptual trap
- Evolutionary mismatch
