= Artificialization =

Geology phenomenon

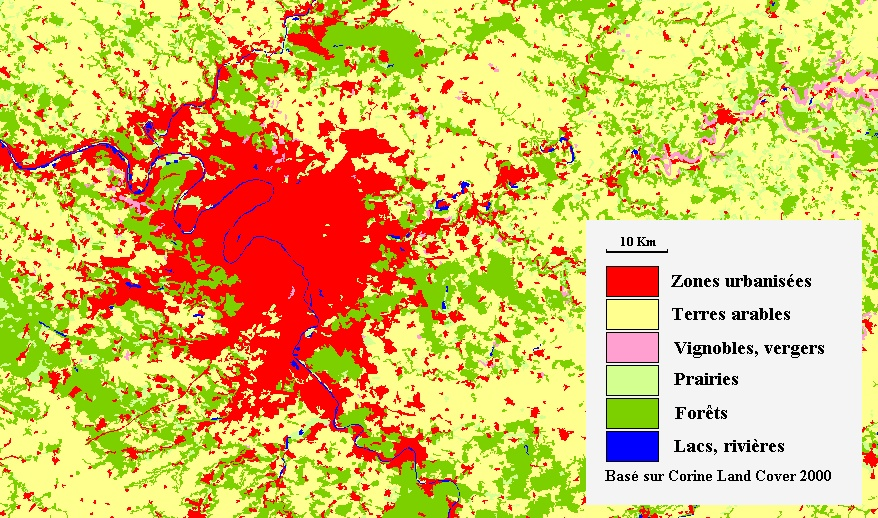
Ile-de-France.

The artificialization of soil, an environment, or natural or semi-natural habitat is the loss of its qualities: its naturalness, a quality that includes a self-sustaining capacity to harbor certain biodiversity, natural cycles (carbon, nitrogen, water, oxygen cycles, etc.), and biogeochemical qualities (carbon sink, for example). It is generally accompanied by a loss of self-healing capacity on the part of the environment (reduced ecological resilience).

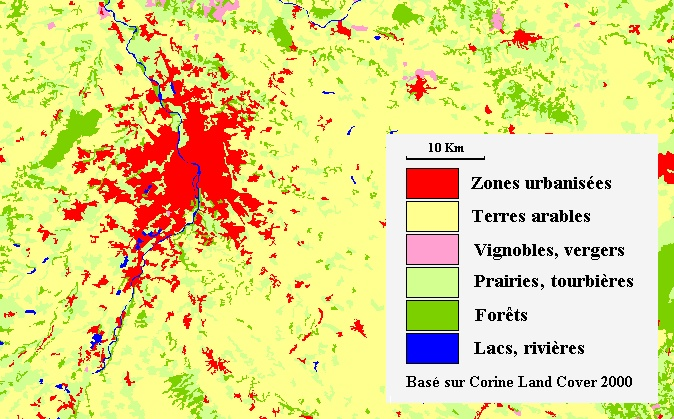
Toulouse.

Artificialization is often summed up as the disappearance of natural spaces under concrete or bitumen, during the construction of buildings (apartment blocks, hotels, houses, shops, industries, parking lots) or transport networks. While soil sealing is a huge part of land artificialisation, more generally, it takes place when natural environments are heavily transformed by man. For example, leisure and sports facilities (green spaces, golf courses, sports fields, motocross courses, winter sports resorts, etc.), canals, road embankments, and artificial lighting can each lead to ecological traps and other impacts, animal mortality on roads, light pollution, etc., and can also lead to the creation of new habitats. It could also be mentioned the areas developed for military purposes (military testing grounds, underground tunnels, fortifications, glacis, no-man's-land, etc.).

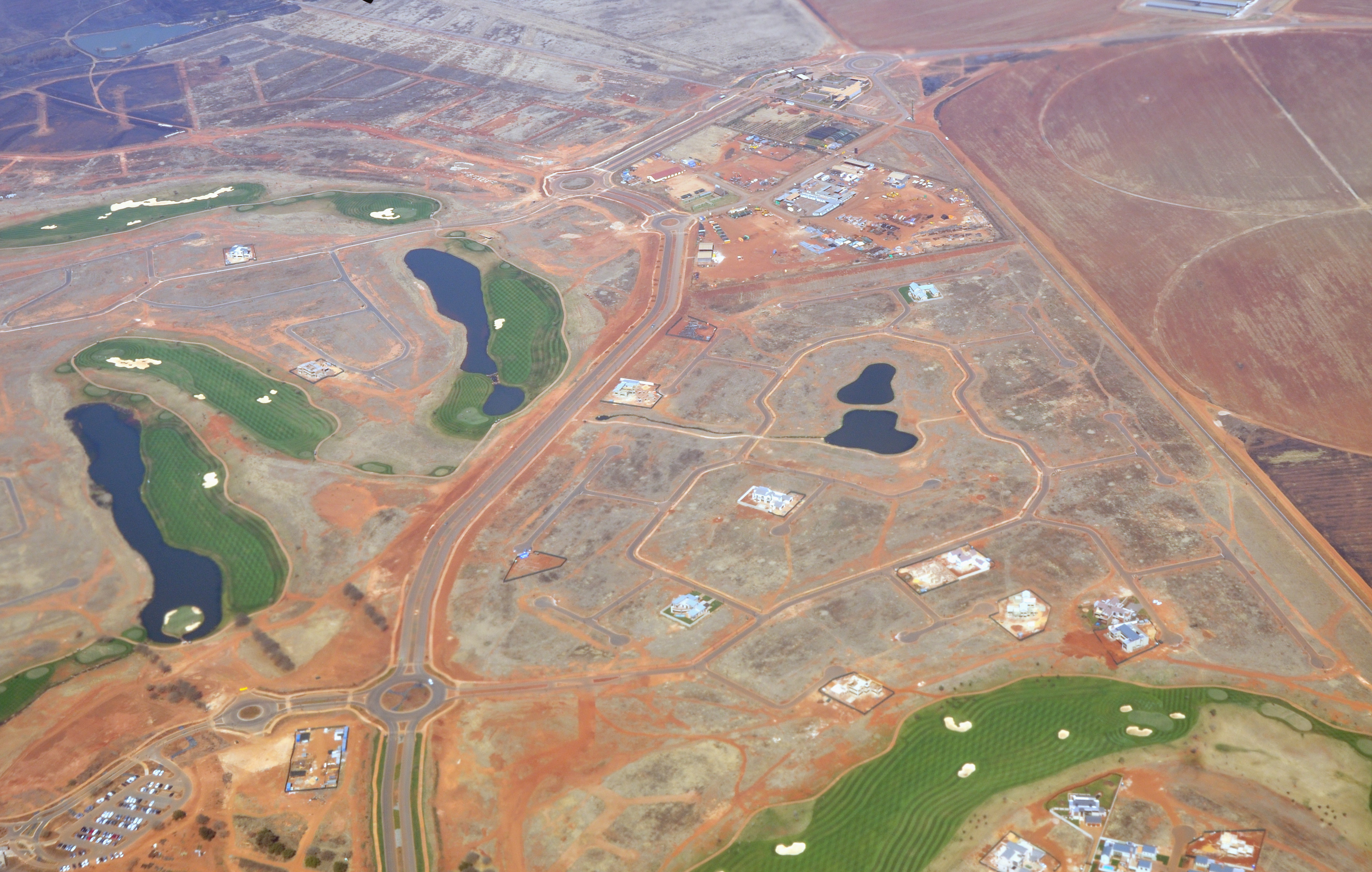
Golf courses and crops in South Africa.

In Europe in 2015, the surface area of sealed land exceeded one million square kilometers, i.e. 2.3% of the European Union's surface area and 200 m² per inhabitant (over 50,000 km2 and 9.4% of the territory in France). On average, 165 ha, or 1,650,000 m² of natural environments and farmland, are destroyed every day in France and replaced by roads, housing, and business parks, as part of the urban sprawl phenomenon. Between 2005 and 2015, this represented almost 6,000 km², the size of a département in ten years. One of the aims of the French Green and Blue Network (TVB or Schéma régional de cohérence écologique) is to limit this phenomenon and mitigate its consequences. Since 2018, the goal of Zero Net Artificialization has been a major roadmap in the fight against artificialization.

== Examples of artificialization ==
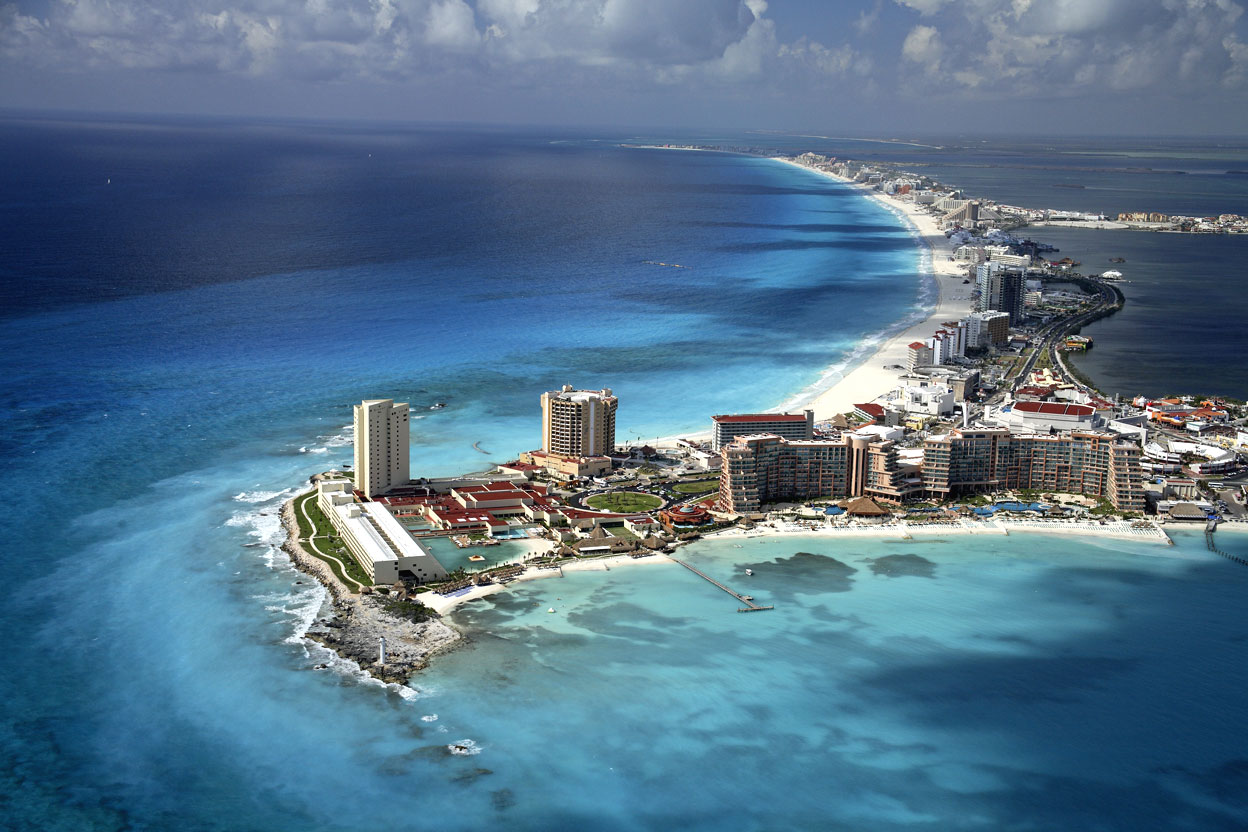
Urbanization of the coastline in Cancun (Mexico, 2008).

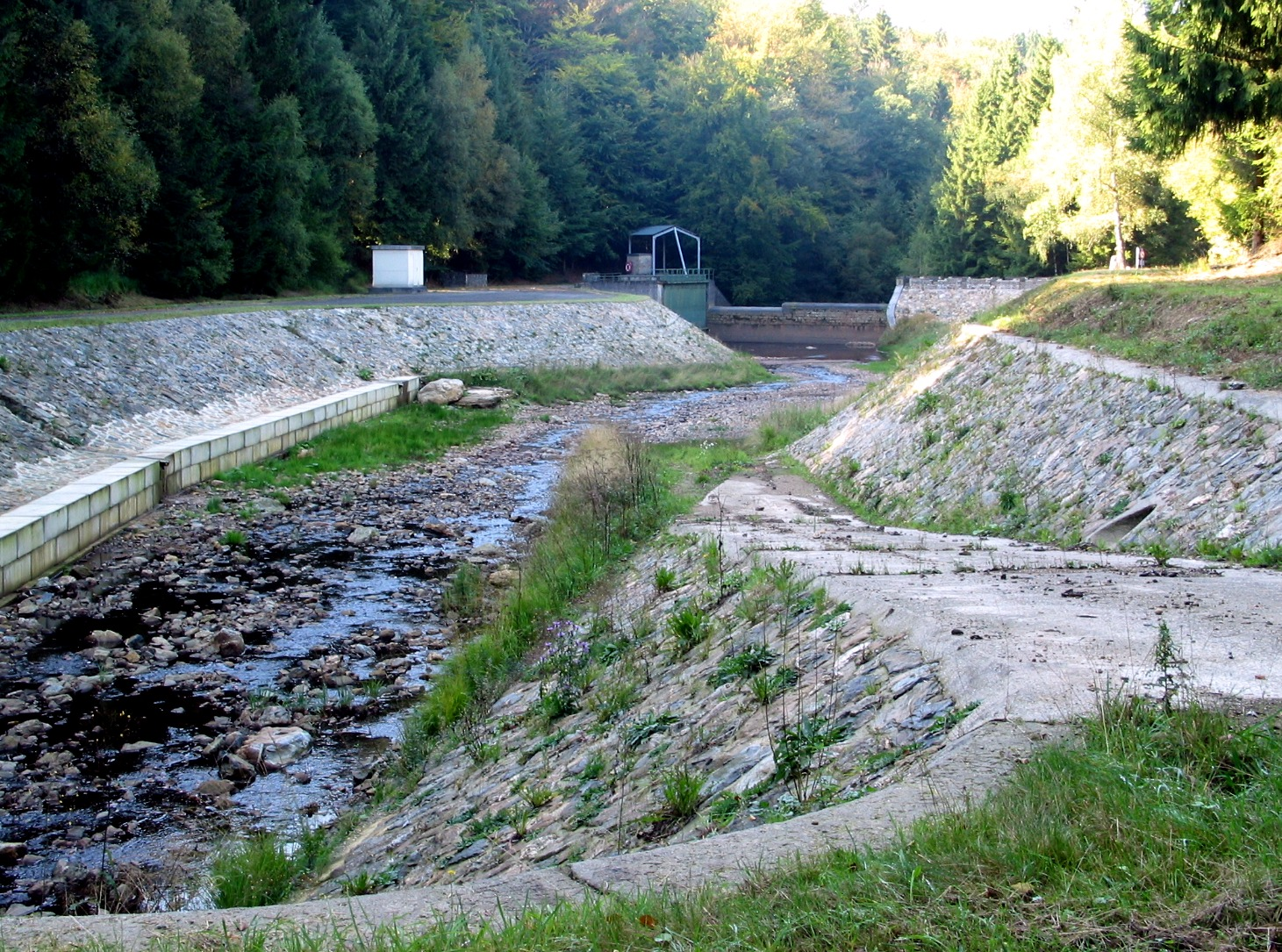
The hydrographic network is one of the natural infrastructures that has been most artificialized, in inhabited and cultivated regions, or where large dams have been built.

Areas affected by artificialization include:

- Rural areas and agricultural zones (especially when exposed to intensive, industrial agriculture). This also applies to grasslands which, when enriched with nutrients or sown with plowing, no longer harbor much of the biodiversity of a natural grassland;
- Certain forest or silvicultural environments where monocultures are practiced (poplar plantations, rubber, eucalyptus, oil palm, short rotation coppice (SRC) or willow, etc., or forests planted or managed largely on the principle of artificial regeneration and heavily fragmented by roads, tracks, and paths);
- Watercourses canalized and fragmented by large dams, cultivated wetlands (e.g. rice paddies), drained wetlands or wetland basins, polders, etc.;
- Coastlines and their estuaries, increasingly developed for tourism, industry, and transport: discharge into the sea, construction of dykes, channels, ports, underwater quarries, etc.

== Extent and progression of the phenomenon ==
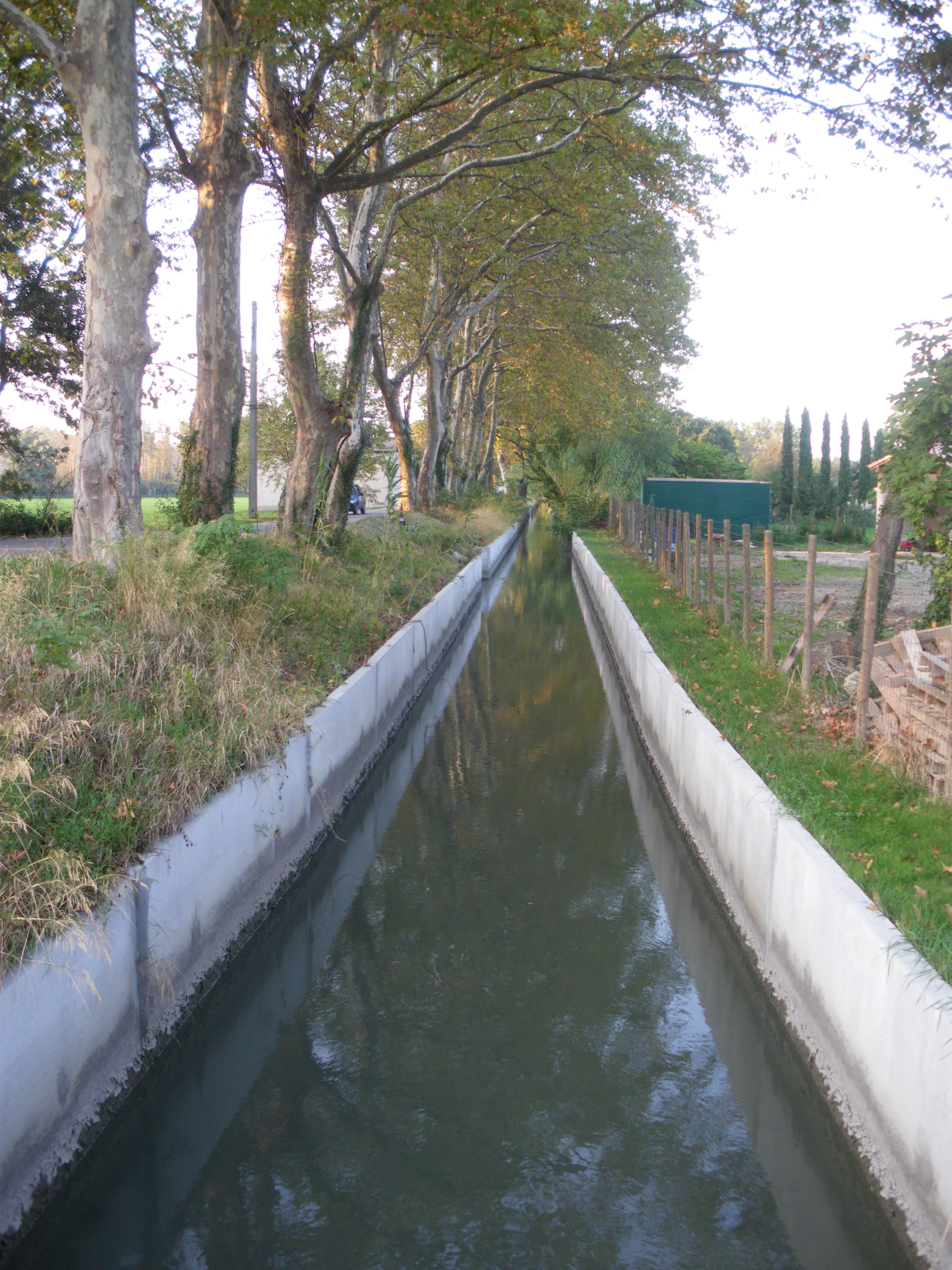
This type of artificialization of aquatic environments (Crillon Canal, Vaucluse) makes them unsuitable for the survival of a large number of species. They also become a trap for many animals that fall into them.

As far as geomorphological and subsoil effects are concerned, the artificialization of the environment began modestly in prehistoric times: clearing by fire, occupation, and development of caves, increasingly sedentary and built-up human habitat, digging of shafts in the subsoil for flint mining, then seed silos and shafts or galleries for the exploitation of metal ore seams, from the Bronze Age onwards.

This was followed by larger-scale developments, often designed for the intensive exploitation of water from the great rivers (Nile, Tigris, Euphrates...). In Europe, beaver dams (and the beavers themselves, hunted for their meat and fur), which maintained water reserves and open riparian habitats, were destroyed. At the same time, the construction of fords, then bridges, dykes, mills, and systems for impounding and regulating watercourses and for drainage spread, culminating in major episodes of polderization, etc. At the same time, the urbanization of the region increased. At the same time, urbanization expanded, supported by networks of roads and trading centers (e.g. the Silk Road). Peri-urban waste dumps appeared, gradually buried beneath the urban sprawl. Cemeteries, monuments, and fortifications (e.g. the Great Wall of China) are accompanied by vast clearing, leveling, and earthworks (terraces, embankments, sunken paths, low walls).

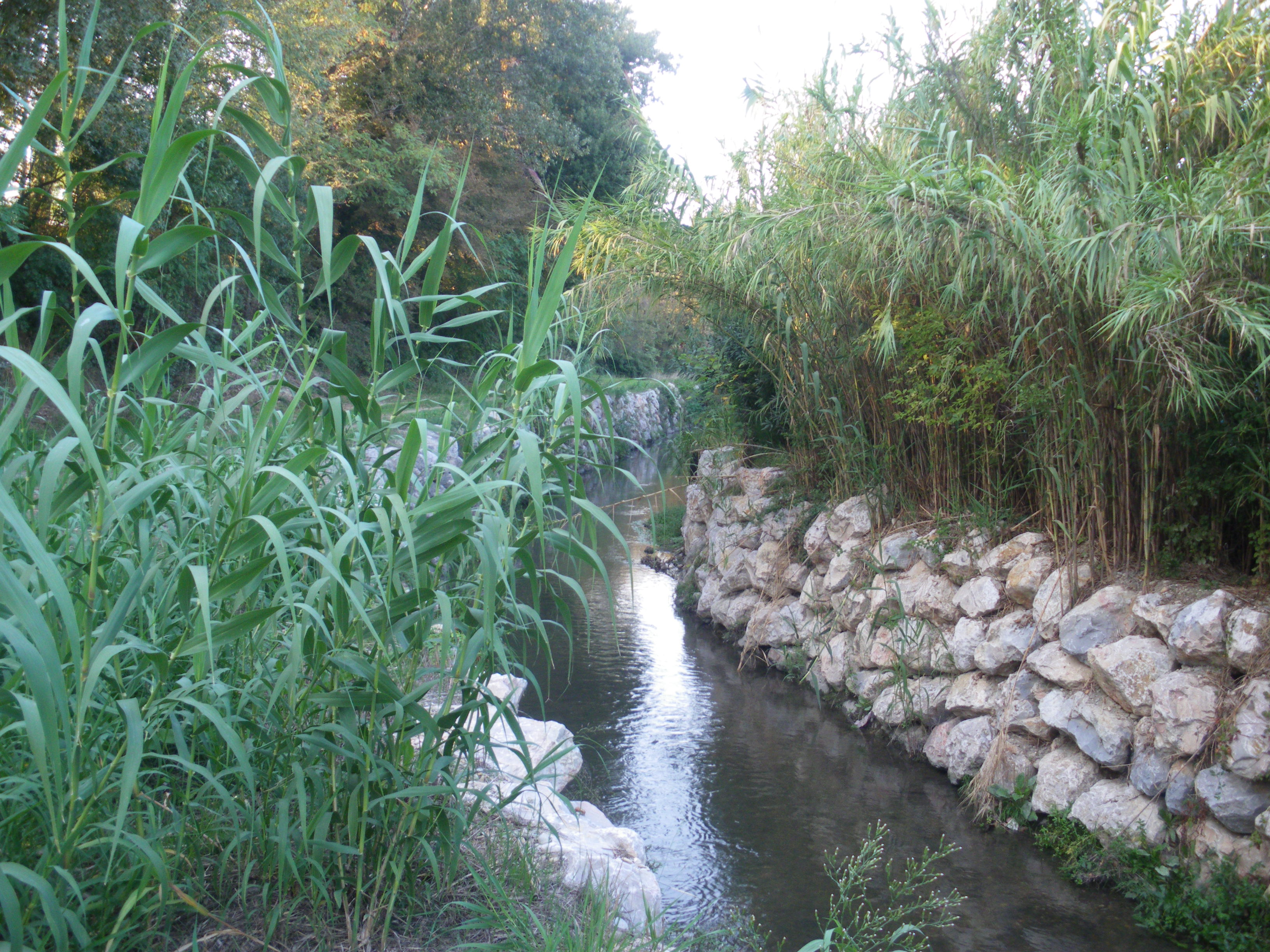
Example alternative to the above example (same channel).

During the Anthropocene, the development of coal mines, the oil industry, railroads, automobiles, and tractors led to more intensive farming. This accelerated the anthropization of the landscape and subsoil, colonized by millions of kilometers of cables, pipes, and sewers, including in the colonies of wealthy countries on every continent. The network of roads, freeways, and railroads is expanding, as are industrial, commercial, sports, and sometimes military facilities. At the end of the twentieth century, the pace of artificialization accelerated even further and is visible on satellite imagery.

Some areas are particularly hard hit: a large part of the coastline and estuaries of many countries has been artificialized by the construction of seaside resorts, coastal road networks, and port facilities. Cities and their outskirts, as well as all agricultural environments, and all ancient forests in temperate countries and then in most tropical countries (with the exception of a few protected massifs).

Artificialization is moving towards developing countries, with peri-urbanization particularly marked in the vicinity of megacities and urban metropolises (in France, for example, the Île-de-France and Toulouse). In wealthy countries, it's often linked to the success of the single-family home, which is also reflected in urban sprawl and peri-urbanization.

=== In France ===
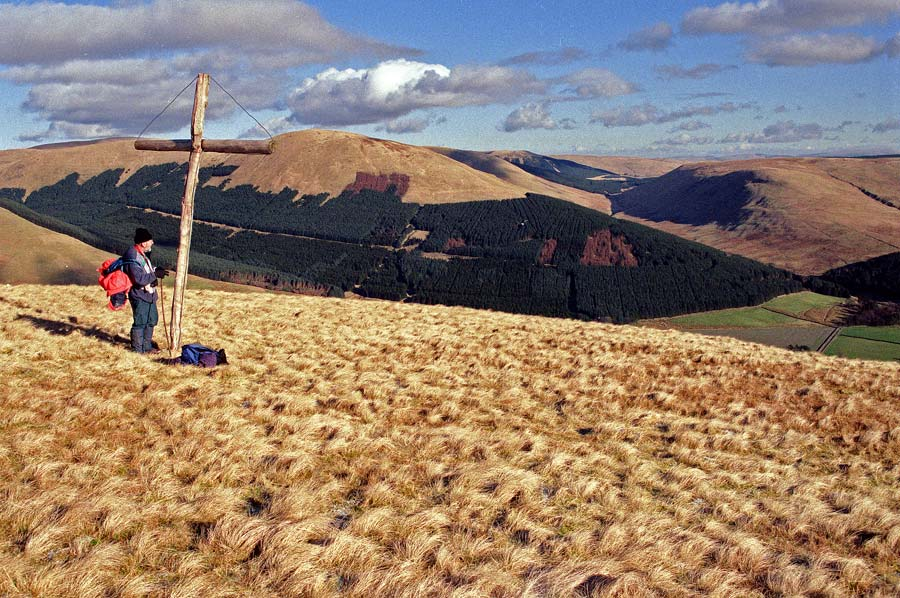
Forestry is sometimes itself a source of artificialization of landscapes (geometrization of plots, single-species alignments, here in the United Kingdom (Carsphairn hills).

The French urban planning code defines artificialisation as "the lasting alteration of all or part of a soil's ecological functions, in particular its biological, hydric and climatic functions, as well as its agronomic potential by its occupation or use".

In 2006, 8.3% of mainland France was affected by land artificialisation, a figure that rose to 9.4% in 2015. In fifty years, seven million hectares of land have been buried for housing (40%), the economy (30%: businesses, warehouses, shops), and transport infrastructure (30%). Since 2009, 90% of land artificialisation has been at the expense of fertile soils.

According to Corine Land Cover statistics on land use in France, the French region with the least amount of artificial land is Corsica, with 2.1% of its surface area, while Île-de-France tops the list with 21.6%.

Of the 28 nations, France ranks 11th for its artificial surface area per capita, reaching 461.6 m2. This represents 16.8% more than a Spaniard, 41.5% more than a German, and 94.5% more than a Briton.

Artificialization is highly polarized at the national level. A study by the Cerema (the French Environment and Spatial Planning Agency) reveals a high level of artificialisation on the coast and around medium-sized towns and cities. In July 2019, annual data on a municipal scale for the period 2009-2017 were published, and have been updated annually since. In 2015 and 2016, it was estimated that the phenomenon had "stabilized" (at 9.3% of mainland France) thanks to the 2008 crisis, which slowed land artificialisation (to +0.8% per year). Recent data, however, confirm a resumption of the phenomenon since 2016: after a period of decline between 2011 and 2016, artificialisation is again increasing its pace, reaching 23,454 ha between 2016 and 2017. In 2022, the Cerema dashboard reveals that 21,079 ha have been taken or pre-empted in 2021 in France on natural and agricultural spaces, almost 1,200 ha more than in 2020, but almost 1,300 ha less than in 2019. Despite this upturn, the Senate majority is calling for a moratorium on the application of the 2021 Climate and Resilience Act, tabling bills to extend deadlines and pointing to the lack of financial resources dedicated to achieving the goal of zero net artificialization. In June 2022, the Association des maires de France (AMF) lodged an appeal with the Conseil d'État against two decrees implementing this law. Christophe Béchu, Minister of Ecological Transition and Territorial Cohesion, has said he is open to rewriting some of the decrees.

In 2009, according to the Institut français de l'environnement (IFEN), land artificialisation increased by 60,000 ha per year (or 6,000 km2 in ten years, equivalent to the size of the Seine-et-Marne département). The 885 coastal municipalities are particularly hard hit. Despite the "natural" and rural areas spared thanks to the Conservatoire du littoral and the Littoral law, less than 500 m from the sea, the rate of artificialization (28.2% of the territory artificialized on average) is 5.5 times higher than the average for metropolitan France. The coastlines of Nord-Pas-de-Calais, Pays de la Loire, Languedoc-Roussillon, and PACA are the most artificialized by construction, while those of Normandy, Brittany and Poitou-Charentes are artificialized by agriculture. Coastal forests and semi-natural areas dominate the landscape only in Aquitaine (with the Atlantic coastal dune forest) and Corsica; Despite the risk of marine invasions induced by rising oceans, this artificialization of the coast is steadily increasing:

- From 2000 to 2006, almost 10,000 ha were artificialized on the 10 km strip of coastline alone in mainland France;
- From 2000 to 2006, development was highest in the 500 to 2,000 m seaward strip (on 0.42% of the territory), i.e. 2.8 times the average for mainland France;
- On the Channel-North Sea coast, artificial development is more evenly distributed from the coastline to two kilometers inland, before decreasing;
- In the Atlantic, on the other hand, artificial development has slowed down along the coastline, increasing between 500 and 1,000 m, before gradually decreasing inland;
- On the Mediterranean coast, from 2000 to 2006, artificial development was almost uniform from the coastline to 10 km from the sea.

=== In China ===
According to Jean-François Doulet, (Note: Jean-François Doulet is a geographer and deputy director of the Franco-Chinese Centre for Cities and Territories.) in the 2010s, the urbanized surface area in China almost quadrupled from the early 1980s to 2012. Artificialization was estimated in 2012 to be equivalent to twice the surface area of the Île-de-France region each year, and a 15-year estimate is for a surface area equivalent to the current urbanized area of Europe.

== Causes ==
Urbanization leads to the creation of suburban areas, housing estates, and towns. Support for commercial activity and tax competition between communes and agglomerations to attract companies leads to the construction of business parks (commercial zones, industrial zones, etc.) and huge parking lots to park their users; The growing mobility of the population has led to the construction and expansion of transport networks.

== Consequences ==
=== Impact on climate ===
In terms of global warming, artificial surfaces, usually dark in color, affect albedo by absorbing solar radiation and emitting long-wave infrared radiation. This radiation is reflected to Earth by greenhouse gases in the atmosphere, contributing to global warming.

This artificialization may have an impact on the local climate, by increasing surface temperatures (LST), as shown by the satellite image of surface temperature measurement opposite.

According to the IPCC's Sixth Assessment Report, reducing vegetation affects the local and adjacent climate through the subsequent disruption of the water cycle). Climate balances are complex and closely linked to the properties of physical surfaces, which also have biological functions. In particular, living organisms have developed strategies for capturing and storing water. Examples include the role of Pseudomonas syringae as a nucleating agent, the effect of earthworm galleries on water infiltration in soils, or the effect of glomalin production by fungi on soil compaction.

Plants also regulate atmospheric water. They are capable of producing aerosols to initiate condensation, or releasing water vapor so that the ambient air reaches the dew point and nucleates rain droplets.

Thus, the disruption of an ecosystem, which is often at equilibrium, leads to a less efficient system, which will tend to heat up more, as evaporating water allows cooling. This is illustrated by infrared satellite observations of a deforested area in Brazil, around Jaru, compared with anthropized areas and pristine surfaces. In the Jaru area, less heat is evacuated by evapotranspiration, as the albedo has increased due to changes in land use.

Warmer soils then disrupt local precipitation as, for example, rainfall volatilizes as it reaches the ground. Volumes of water lost through runoff (or conveyed by man) are not evapotranspired and are not received by areas further out on the continent.

Cities, through the heat islands they form, modify the volume and intensity of precipitation. It is therefore possible to see the location of certain cities on a precipitation map. It is possible to see storm fronts cease activity close to cities while continuing on either side and resuming further out.

Conversely, reducing the gap between hot and cold spots can significantly improve the climate, as demonstrated by an observational and modeling study of climate conditions in the Corn Belt region of the USA. This area takes its name from the high density of corn grown there. Temperature trends over the period 1970–2020 are comparatively negative compared with the period 1910–1950 (−0.35 °C), while warming is observable around the area. By climatic mechanisms, precipitation increases in this area. A comparison between the results obtained by global modeling and those obtained by a smaller-scale model demonstrates the relevance of implementing models that are correctly parameterized and truly reflect surface properties (in this case, the right percentage of maize).

=== Impact on biodiversity and ecological functionality ===
From the point of view of environmental ethics, artificialization raises the dual question of the decline in biodiversity and the relationship between man and nature, at a time when man, ever more urbanized, seems to be drifting away from nature, losing certain landmarks that have been those of his ancestors for thousands of years, which could affect his chronobiological rhythms, his psychomotricity and even the construction of his psyche. In addition, numerous studies have shown that the artificialization of natural environments leads to a loss of biodiversity and changes in the functional composition of biotopes, a loss that is associated with a reduction in the productivity and stability of ecosystems.

From the point of view of ecology and landscape ecology, the artificialization of landscapes, environments, and biotopes is one of the factors contributing to the ecological fragmentation of natural habitats and the qualitative degradation of landscapes. It is one of the factors used to calculate the eco-potentiality of a plot, region, or landscape element. It is also a factor in homogenization (genetic, taxonomic, and functional), which is highly unfavorable to the maintenance of biodiversity. By favoring ubiquitous species to the detriment of much more varied specialist species, anthropogenic homogenization of life (Biotic homogenization) has serious immediate and future consequences for ecological and evolutionary processes. Researchers are calling for a better understanding of the implications of this homogenization for conservation, and for the rapid promotion of proactive, restorative, and adaptive management, to better control the human component of the "anthropic blender" that human activities have become for the planet's biota.

Some artificial environments (such as certain quarries and slag heaps), because they have received neither fertilizers nor pesticides, may nevertheless be home to processes characterized by a high degree of naturalness. Semi-natural environments are also used to designate environments that have been artificially altered, but can still act as a substitute habitat for some of the species in a given biogeographical zone (e.g. meadows, hedgerows, and certain extensively managed forests, such as the "prosilva" type).

It also concerns the nocturnal environment, disturbed by artificial lighting (light pollution).

=== Impact on natural hazards ===
From a planner's point of view, the artificialization of an area increases the probability (in terms of frequency and severity) of certain natural disasters and risks (floods, forest fires, mudslides, mining subsidence, cave-ins (e.g. catiches), zoonotic epidemics, etc.), while reducing the environment's resilience in the face of these disturbances.

=== Impact on hydrology and soil fertility ===
From an agronomist's point of view, soil artificialization leads to a loss of humus and carbon, a reduced water retention capacity, and, consequently, a loss of fertility, aggravating the phenomena of erosion and soil degradation. In the long term, this leads to a loss of natural and agricultural resources, in addition to the loss of arable land to built-up or waterproofed areas (although some greenhouse crops are grown on artificial soil, or even without any soil at all, using hydroponics).

== Observing, assessing, and combating the phenomenon ==
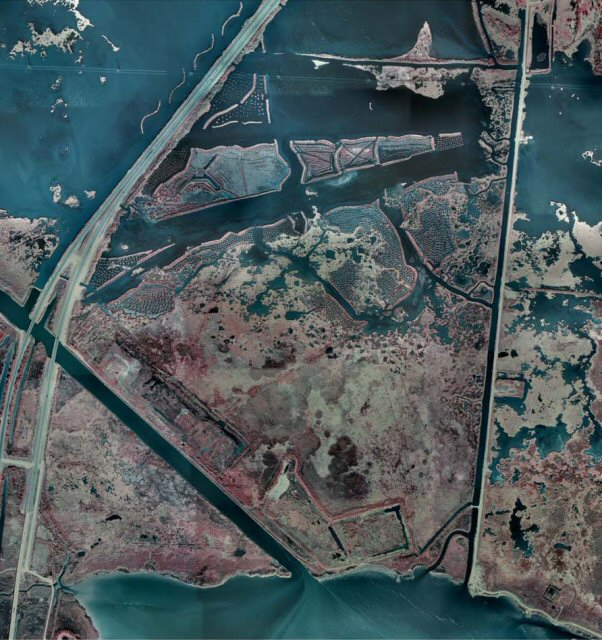
Former estuary of Port Arthur (Texas), which is the subject of renaturation projects.

Quantifying artificialization involves comparing land use data. The fight against artificialization requires knowledge and measurement of the phenomenon, urban renewal, urban densification, the development of green and blue grids, and the application of the ERC principle (avoid-reduce-compensate, which can be translated as follows: avoid building, reduce the surface area to be built on, compensate by planting trees).

=== In France ===
==== Before 2018 ====
The law of December 30, 2006, on the preservation of water resources and aquatic environments allows municipalities to introduce a tax on impervious surfaces.

Article 7 of the 2009 Grenelle de l'environnement implementation bill, known as "Grenelle I", calls for:

- "a study on tax reform and possible incentives to limit the spread of artificial land", within six months of the law's publication;
- within a year of the law's publication, incorporate the following objective into town planning law: "to combat the decline in agricultural and natural land, with local authorities setting quantified targets in this area once space consumption indicators have been defined".

Agricultural land is the hardest hit, which is why the French Agricultural Modernization Act of July 27, 2010, aims to halve the rate of consumption of agricultural land over ten years (2010-2020), aided by the Departmental Commissions for the Consumption of Agricultural Spaces (CDCEA) it sets up. However, the 2012 Environmental Conference was less ambitious, aiming only to slow down the artificialization of land (to achieve stability by 2025).

Some regional climate-air-energy plans (SRCAE) include quantified targets, such as that of the Nord-Pas-de-Calais region (a threefold reduction in the rate of land development). In parallel with its Trame Verte et Bleue, in 2006 the region experimented with a regional planning directive aimed at combating the artificialization of the territory through peri-urbanization.

An October 17, 2013 report by the French National Audit Office (Cour des Comptes) found that the tools available in France to combat the artificialization of land are "numerous", but "imprecise" and too dispersed: The Court notes that it has taken too long to set up the National Observatory on the Consumption of Agricultural Land (ONCEA), and calls for improvements to the statistics measuring trends in land artificialisation (they take poor account of conversions of natural and forested land, for example), and for existing measures to protect natural or agricultural land to be made more coherent or better used. The Court also criticizes the lack of enforceability of a number of measures (SRADDT, Directive régionale d'aménagement (DRA), PAEN (périmètre de protection et de mise en valeur des espaces agricoles et naturels), ZAP (Zone agricole protégée), a little-used tool), and calls for the transfer of urban planning powers to inter-municipalities to reduce the "proximity between elected representatives and voters, the sellers of farmland". She also suggests ways of making taxation more conducive to less artificial development.

==== After 2018 ====
On July 4, 2018, the French government released the Biodiversity Plan, which aims to achieve "zero net land take" (ZAN) and to "[publish] an annual report on land consumption and [provide] transparent and comparable data at all territorial levels for regions and citizens." On July 1, 2019, a portal dedicated to artificial land use was launched to raise awareness about the phenomenon. This platform also makes annual and municipal data on French territory accessible, enabling external stakeholders to better understand the issue. In the same year, a National Observatory of Soil Artificialization was established.

The Minister for Ecological and Inclusive Transition commissioned a foresight mission to France Stratégie to outline scenarios for achieving the ZAN target and to identify ways to protect natural, agricultural, and forested areas. The resulting report, authored by biologist Julien Fosse, was made public on July 23, 2019, and presented to Emmanuelle Wargon and Julien Denormandie. The public think tank proposed measures to achieve zero net land take by 2030, focusing on reducing gross artificialization through higher-density new constructions and restoring abandoned artificialized lands.

In 2021, the Climate and Resilience Act, under its section titled "Housing," set a goal to halve the rate of land take over the next decade compared to the previous one, to achieve zero net artificialization by 2050. The law also prohibits the construction of new large retail spaces, with exceptions for sales areas under 10,000 square meters.

=== Elsewhere in Europe ===
- Germany set an ambitious target to reduce land take by two-thirds by 2020.
- In Switzerland, 100,000 citizens signed a petition calling for a 20-year moratorium on land artificialization (from 2012 to 2032), leading to a referendum in 2013.
- In contrast, England reformed its urban planning laws in 2012 to relax regulations. George Osborne, then the British Chancellor of the Exchequer, justified the reform by citing a shortage of buildable land.
- In Flanders, Belgium, it was estimated in 2006 that over 20 years, residential developments had consumed about ten hectares per day or roughly 1 square meter per second. The developed area increased by 46% in two decades, resulting in a quarter of Flanders being urbanized (one-fifth of Belgium was artificialized by 2006).

=== At the European Union Level ===
Following directives on water and air, the proposed framework directive for soil protection aimed to address soil degradation and erosion across Europe. The European Commission introduced the directive in September 2006, and it was adopted in the first reading by the European Parliament on November 14, 2007. However, it was blocked the following year by five countries—France, Germany, the United Kingdom, Austria, and the Netherlands—preventing a qualified majority. The directive was ultimately abandoned in 2014.

== See also ==
- Anthropization – Conversion of natural environments by human action
- Biodiversity – Variety and variability of life forms
- Landscape ecology – Relationships between ecological processes in the environment and particular ecosystems
- Ecosystem – Community of living organisms together with the nonliving components of their environment
- Ecological footprint – Individual's or a group's human demand on nature
- Environmental ethics – Part of environmental philosophy
- Biological integrity – Metric for the quality of an ecosystem
- Wilderness – Undisturbed natural environment
- Novel ecosystem – Human-created ecological niche
- Ecological trap – Phenomenon in which species sometimes prefer low-quality habitat
- Nature conservation – Movement to protect the biosphere
- Soil retrogression and degradation – Two processes associated with loss of stable soil equilibrium
- Land restoration – Process of restoring land to a different state
- Green infrastructure – Sustainable and resilient infrastructure

== Bibliography ==
- Lecomte, Jacques (1999). Réflexion sur la naturalité [Reflection on naturalness] (PDF) (in French). Courrier de l'environnement de l'INRA. pp. 5–10.
- Lecomte, Jacques (2006). La Nature, singulière ou plurielle ? Connaître pour protéger [Nature, singular or plural? Know to protect] (in French). éditions Quae. ISBN 978-2-7380-1224-1.
- Sainteny, Guillaume (2023). "Terres agricoles: une fiscalité anti-écologique" [Agricultural land: anti-ecological taxation]. France Culture (Radio, 16 minutes) (in French).
- "La nature a-t-elle encore une place dans les milieux géographiques?" [Does nature still have a place in geographical environments?]. Calenda (in French). 29 September 2004.
- Fuhr, Marc; Brun, Jean-Jacques (2008). "Biodiversité, naturalité, humanité – Pour inspirer la gestion des forêts" [Biodiversity, naturalness, humanity – To inspire forest management]. Natures Sciences Sociétés (in French). 18 (1). Chambéry: 67–69. doi:10.1051/nss/2010012.
