= Anthropization =

Conversion of natural environments by human action

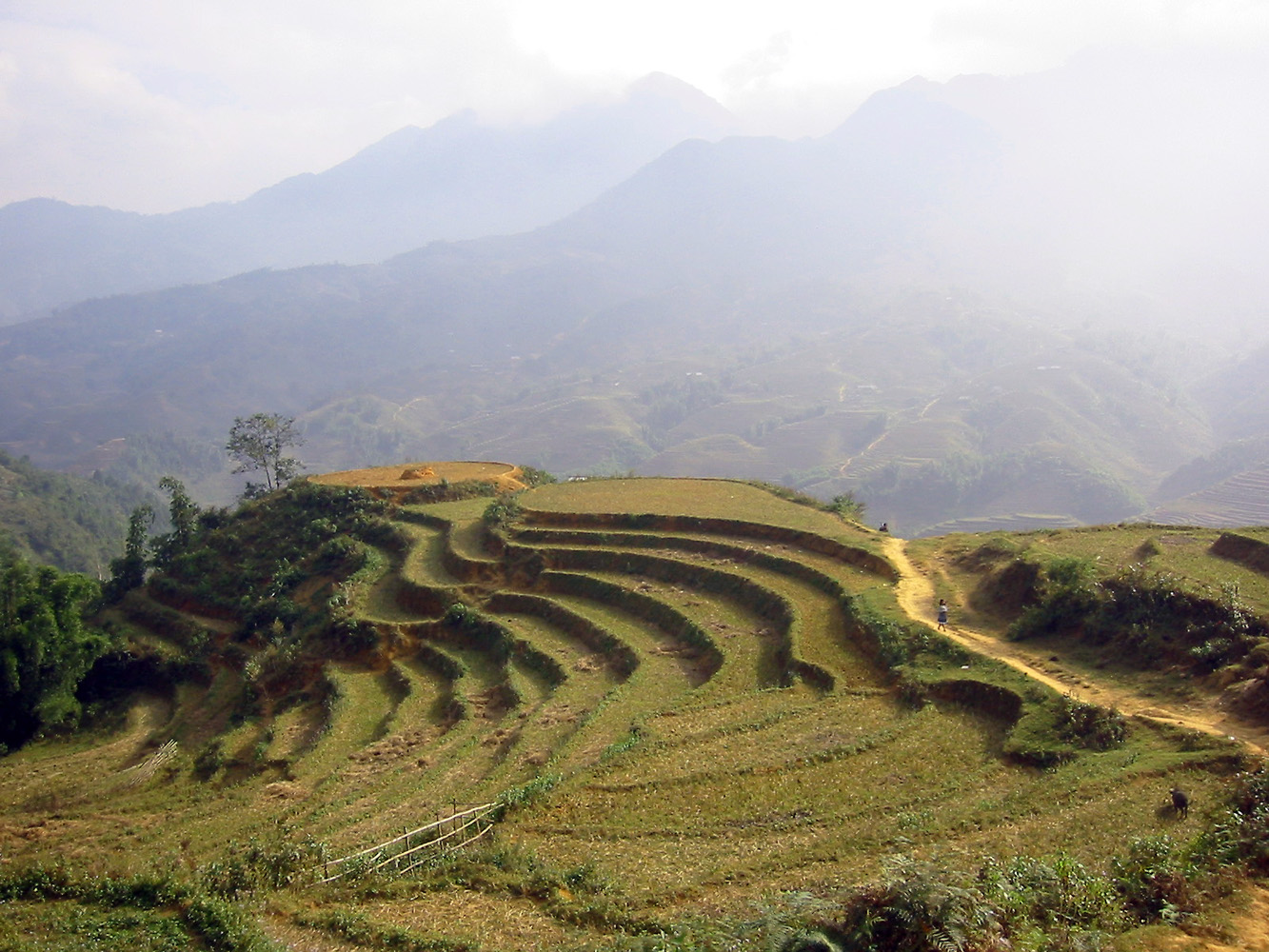
An example of advanced anthropization: the cultivation of rice in terraces in Vietnam

In geography and ecology, anthropization is the conversion of open spaces, landscapes, and natural environments by human action.

Anthropic erosion is the process of human action degrading terrain and soil.

An area may be classified as anthropized even though it looks natural, such as grasslands that have been deforested by humans. It can be difficult to determine how much a site has been anthropized in the case of urbanization because one must be able to estimate the state of the landscape before significant human action.

== Origin ==
The earliest known stages of anthropization can be found as early as the Neolithic era and the basic farmland created in that time. With the continually-growing population of humans, the land that the Earth provides has been appropriated over the years. The ecological footprint created by anthropization is continually growing despite efficiency and technique improvements made in anthropization..

Whether anthropized or not, all land seldom a few locations has been claimed. Outside of the largely inhospitable Arctic and Antarctic circles and large portions of other uninhabitable landscapes, much of the globe has been used or altered in some direct way by humans. Land has been appropriated for many different reasons, but ultimately the outcome is typically a short-term benefit for humans. An area is anthropized is some way to make land available for housing, to harvest the resources, to create space for some anthropological reason, or many other possibilities.

== Processes and effects ==
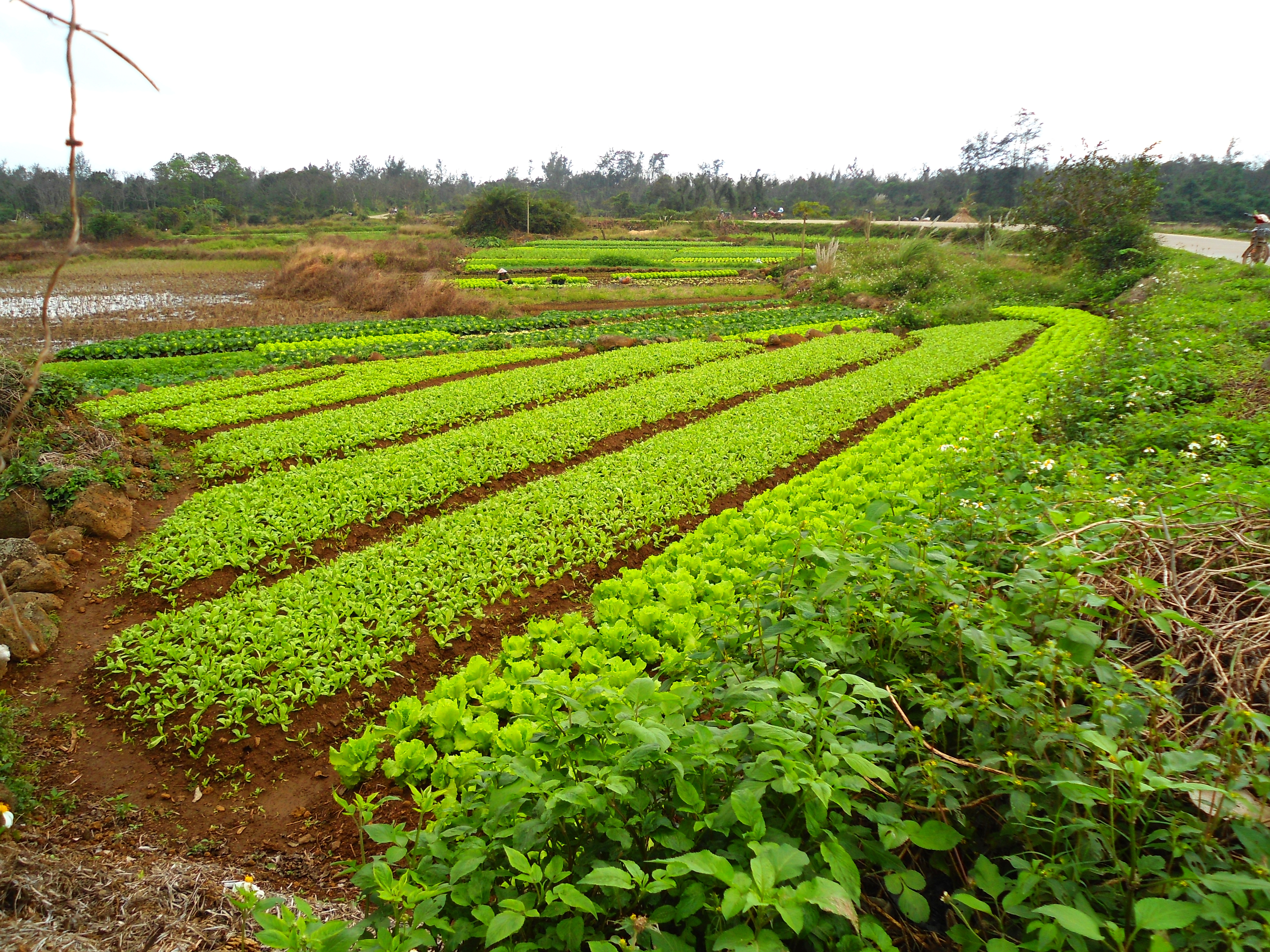
An example of land that has been appropriated for cultivation in Hainan, China.

=== Agriculture ===
The root of many early forms of civilization, agriculture has been a primary reason for anthropization. To cultivate food or breed animals, humans must alter land—till soil or build structures—to facilitate agriculture. This can lead to soil erosion and pollution (pesticides, greenhouse gas emissions, etc.), and subsequently habitat fragmentation and overall an increased ecological footprint. Agriculture and industry often overlap, and industry produces many of these effects too.

=== Urban development ===
Especially with approximately 7.5 Billion humans inhabiting the Earth, this typically aligns with an increase in residences worldwide. Over the years, humans have built on land to meet their needs and wants. These actions range from small villages to massive factories, water parks, and apartments. Urbanization and development of human residences can significantly affect the environment. Not only does the physical space of buildings fragment habitats and possibly endanger species, but it fundamentally alters the habitat for any other living being. For some species, this effect can be inconsequential, but for many this can have a dramatic impact. The biosphere is very much interconnected, and this means that if one organism is affected, then as a result the other organisms within this ecosystem and food chain are also affected.

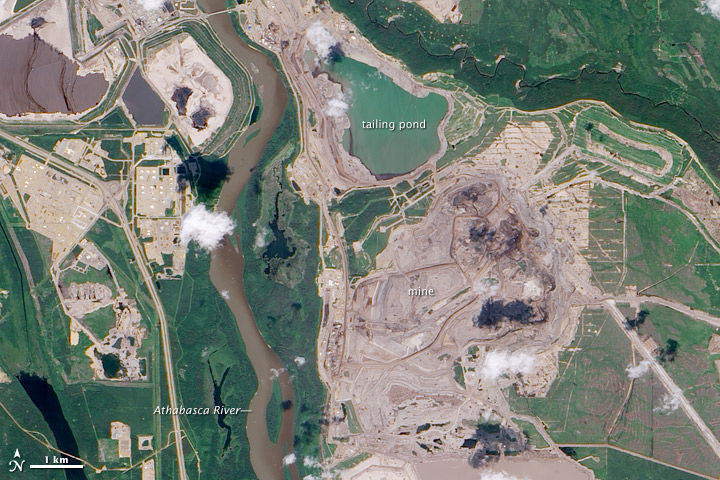
The Athabasca oil sands are an example of anthropization as a result of the harvest and transport of a non-renewable resource, oil sands.

As well, within the last century, any urbanized area requires roads for transportation. This transportation is a continued source of pollution, and the roads can be a source of soil erosion.

=== Industry and technology ===
To support humans, industrial buildings and processes are apparently essential. Urban development and agriculture require that people produce, refined, or construct many things. Key to this is that factories require that people gather the materials they need to create a product. The wide range of products in this anthropological age use a plethora of substances that must be harvested or produced. Many of these materials are non-renewable (e.g., fossil fuel, metal ores, etc.) and the harvest of these results in relatively permanent anthropization. For resources that depend on in high quantity, this can also mean temporary depletion or damage to the source of the resource (e.g., depletion or pollution of fresh water reserves, improper or inefficient silviculture, etc.). Even sustainable or renewable industrial anthropization still affects the environment. While the resource in question may not be in jeopardy, the harvest and processing can still change and damage the environment.

==== Science ====
Anthropization can also be a result of scientific endeavours. This can manifest as construction of structures to aid in scientific discovery and observation. This can range from structures such as observatories, or on the opposite scale the Large Hadron Collider. These and many other things are built and used to enhance knowledge of sciences. They do however require space and energy.

==== Energy ====
To power the ever-growing human race, energy is needed. Power-harvesting structures are built to harness energy, such as dams, windmills, and nuclear reactors. These sources of energy ultimately fuel the rest of anthropological activity and are essential in this way. However many of these methods have consequences. With dams, construction aside, they can cause flooding, habitat fragmentation, and other effects. With nuclear reactors, they have a lasting effect in that typically a lifespan of one of these is around 50 years and afterwards the nuclear waste must be dealt with, and the structure itself must be shut down and cannot be used further. To safely dispose of this even low-level waste can take hundreds of years, ranging upwards with increased radioactivity. To produce and as a result of this production of energy, it requires a lot of anthropized land.

== Evolution of anthropization ==
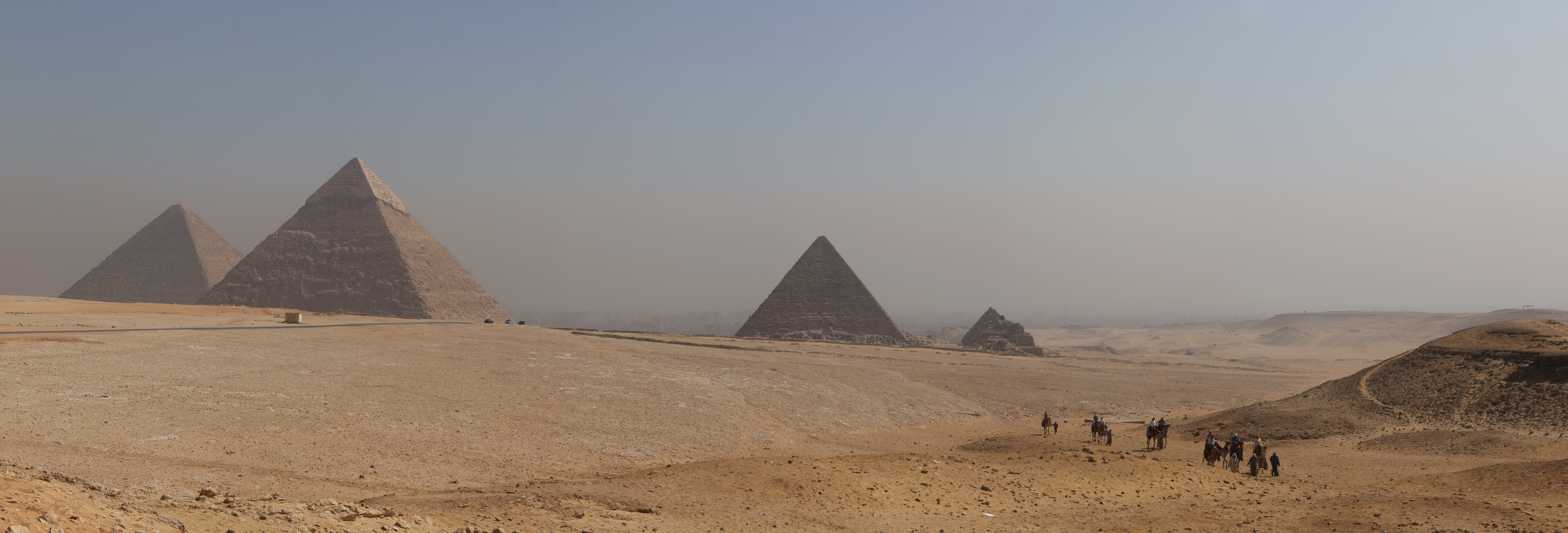
An example of ancient anthropization; Giza pyramid complex, Egypt.

Changes in population directly effect anthropological impact—but changes in technology and knowledge have greatly changed anthropization throughout the Holocene. The tools and methods that humans use to anthropize have changed drastically. For examples, the great pyramids in Egypt were not constructed by some large machine, but instead by thousands of humans. They were still able to build massive monuments, but the efficiency of their efforts and environmental damage was very different from what would be possible today. This shows that the environmental effect of modern anthropization is generally greater, not just because of the increase in population. Pollution and loss of biodiversity in Egypt was largely natural, not man-made, and anthropization existed on a much lower level.

As the human population of Earth increase, this anthropization will continue to evolve.

== See also ==
- Ecological footprint
- Land development
- Land use
- Wilderness
- Artificialization
