= Source–sink dynamics =

Ecological model of population distribution

Source–sink dynamics is a theoretical model used by ecologists to describe how variation in habitat quality may affect the population growth or decline of organisms.

Since quality is likely to vary among patches of habitat, it is important to consider how a low quality patch might affect a population. In this model, organisms occupy two patches of habitat. One patch, the source, is a high quality habitat that on average allows the population to increase. The second patch, the sink, is a very low quality habitat that, on its own, would not be able to support a population. However, if the excess of individuals produced in the source frequently moves to the sink, the sink population can persist indefinitely. Organisms are generally assumed to be able to distinguish between high and low quality habitat, and to prefer high quality habitat. However, ecological trap theory describes the reasons why organisms may actually prefer sink patches over source patches. Finally, the source–sink model implies that some habitat patches may be more important to the long-term survival of the population, and considering the presence of source–sink dynamics will help inform conservation decisions.

== Theory development ==
Although the seeds of a source–sink model had been planted earlier, Pulliam is often recognized as the first to present a fully developed source–sink model. He defined source and sink patches in terms of their demographic parameters, or BIDE rates (birth, immigration, death, and emigration rates). In the source patch, birth rates were greater than death rates, causing the population to grow. The excess individuals were expected to leave the patch, so that emigration rates were greater than immigration rates. In other words, sources were a net exporter of individuals. In contrast, in a sink patch, death rates were greater than birth rates, resulting in a population decline toward extinction unless enough individuals emigrated from the source patch. Immigration rates were expected to be greater than emigration rates, so that sinks were a net importer of individuals. As a result, there would be a net flow of individuals from the source to the sink (see Table 1).

Pulliam's work was followed by many others who developed and tested the source–sink model. Watkinson and Sutherland presented a phenomenon in which high immigration rates could cause a patch to appear to be a sink by raising the patch's population above its carrying capacity (the number of individuals it can support). However, in the absence of immigration, the patches are able to support a smaller population. Since true sinks cannot support any population, the authors called these patches "pseudo-sinks". Definitively distinguishing between true sinks and pseudo-sinks requires cutting off immigration to the patch in question and determining whether the patch is still able to maintain a population. Thomas et al. were able to do just that, taking advantage of an unseasonable frost that killed off the host plants for a source population of Edith's checkerspot butterfly (Euphydryas editha). Without the host plants, the supply of immigrants to other nearby patches was cut off. Although these patches had appeared to be sinks, they did not become extinct without the constant supply of immigrants. They were capable of sustaining a smaller population, suggesting that they were in fact pseudo-sinks.

Watkinson and Sutherland's caution about identifying pseudo-sinks was followed by Dias, who argued that differentiating between sources and sinks themselves may be difficult. She asserted that a long-term study of the demographic parameters of the populations in each patch is necessary. Otherwise, temporary variations in those parameters, perhaps due to climate fluctuations or natural disasters, may result in a misclassification of the patches. For example, Johnson described periodic flooding of a river in Costa Rica which completely inundated patches of the host plant for a rolled-leaf beetle (Cephaloleia fenestrata). During the floods, these patches became sinks, but at other times they were no different from other patches. If researchers had not considered what happened during the floods, they would not have understood the full complexity of the system.

Dias also argued that an inversion between source and sink habitat is possible so that the sinks may actually become the sources. Because reproduction in source patches is much higher than in sink patches, natural selection is generally expected to favor adaptations to the source habitat. However, if the proportion of source to sink habitat changes so that sink habitat becomes much more available, organisms may begin to adapt to it instead. Once adapted, the sink may become a source habitat. This is believed to have occurred for the blue tit (Parus caeruleus) 7500 years ago as forest composition on Corsica changed, but few modern examples are known. Boughton described a source—pseudo-sink inversion in butterfly populations of E. editha. Following the frost, the butterflies had difficulty recolonizing the former source patches. Boughton found that the host plants in the former sources senesced much earlier than in the former pseudo-sink patches. As a result, immigrants regularly arrived too late to successfully reproduce. He found that the former pseudo-sinks had become sources, and the former sources had become true sinks.

One of the most recent additions to the source–sink literature is by Tittler et al., who examined wood thrush (Hylocichla mustelina) survey data for evidence of source and sink populations on a large scale. The authors reasoned that emigrants from sources would likely be the juveniles produced in one year dispersing to reproduce in sinks in the next year, producing a one-year time lag between population changes in the source and in the sink. Using data from the Breeding Bird Survey, an annual survey of North American birds, they looked for relationships between survey sites showing such a one-year time lag. They found several pairs of sites showing significant relationships 60–80 km apart. Several appeared to be sources to more than one sink, and several sinks appeared to receive individuals from more than one source. In addition, some sites appeared to be a sink to one site and a source to another (see Figure 1). The authors concluded that source–sink dynamics may occur on continental scales.

One of the more confusing issues involves identifying sources and sinks in the field. Runge et al. point out that in general researchers need to estimate per capita reproduction, probability of survival, and probability of emigration to differentiate source and sink habitats. If emigration is ignored, then individuals that emigrate may be treated as mortalities, thus causing sources to be classified as sinks. This issue is important if the source–sink concept is viewed in terms of habitat quality (as it is in Table 1) because classifying high-quality habitat as low-quality may lead to mistakes in ecological management. Runge et al. showed how to integrate the theory of source–sink dynamics with population projection matrices and ecological statistics in order to differentiate sources and sinks.

Table 1. Summary characteristics of variations on the source–sink dynamics model.
	Source–sink	Source–pseudosink	Ecological trap
Source patch (high quality habitat)	Stable or growing Attractive; Net exporter	Stable or growing Attractive; Net exporter	Stable or growing Avoided (or equal); Net exporter
Sink, pseudo-sink, or trap patch (low quality habitat)	Declines to extinction Avoided; Net importer	Declines to stable size Either; Net importer	Declines to extinction Attractive (or equal); Net importer
Habitat patches are represented in terms of their (1) inherent abilities to maintain a population (in the absence of immigration), (2) their attractiveness to organisms that are actively dispersing and choosing habitat patches, and (3) whether they are net exporters or importers of dispersing individuals. Note that in all of these systems, source patches are capable of supporting stable or growing populations and are net exporters of individuals. The major difference between them is that in the ecological trap model, the source patch is avoided (or at least not preferred to the low quality trap patch). All of the low quality patches (whether sinks, pseudo-sinks, or traps) are net importers of dispersing individuals, and in the absence of dispersal, would show a population decline. However, pseudo-sinks would not decline to extinction as they are capable of supporting a smaller population. The other major difference between these low quality patch types is in their attractiveness; sink populations are avoided while trap patches are preferred (or at least not avoided).

== Modes of dispersal ==
Why would individuals ever leave high quality source habitat for a low quality sink habitat? This question is central to source–sink theory. Ultimately, it depends on the organisms and the way they move and distribute themselves between habitat patches. For example, plants disperse passively, relying on other agents such as wind or water currents to move seeds to another patch. Passive dispersal can result in source–sink dynamics whenever the seeds land in a patch that cannot support the plant's growth or reproduction. Winds may continually deposit seeds there, maintaining a population even though the plants themselves do not successfully reproduce. Another good example for this case are soil protists. Soil protists also disperse passively, relying mainly on wind to colonize other sites. As a result, source–sink dynamics can arise simply because external agents dispersed protist propagules (e.g., cysts, spores), forcing individuals to grow in a poor habitat.

In contrast, many organisms that disperse actively should have no reason to remain in a sink patch, provided the organisms are able to recognize it as a poor quality patch (see discussion of ecological traps). The reasoning behind this argument is that organisms are often expected to behave according to the "ideal free distribution", which describes a population in which individuals distribute themselves evenly among habitat patches according to how many individuals the patch can support. When there are patches of varying quality available, the ideal free distribution predicts a pattern of "balanced dispersal". In this model, when the preferred habitat patch becomes crowded enough that the average fitness (survival rate or reproductive success) of the individuals in the patch drops below the average fitness in a second, lower quality patch, individuals are expected to move to the second patch. However, as soon as the second patch becomes sufficiently crowded, individuals are expected to move back to the first patch. Eventually, the patches should become balanced so that the average fitness of the individuals in each patch and the rates of dispersal between the two patches are even. In this balanced dispersal model, the probability of leaving a patch is inversely proportional to the carrying capacity of the patch. In this case, individuals should not remain in sink habitat for very long, where the carrying capacity is zero and the probability of leaving is therefore very high.

An alternative to the ideal free distribution and balanced dispersal models is when fitness can vary among potential breeding sites within habitat patches and individuals must select the best available site. This alternative has been called the "ideal preemptive distribution", because a breeding site can be preempted if it has already been occupied. For example, the dominant, older individuals in a population may occupy all of the best territories in the source so that the next best territory available may be in the sink. As the subordinate, younger individuals age, they may be able to take over territories in the source, but new subordinate juveniles from the source will have to move to the sink. Pulliam argued that such a pattern of dispersal can maintain a large sink population indefinitely. Furthermore, if good breeding sites in the source are rare and poor breeding sites in the sink are common, it is even possible that the majority of the population resides in the sink.

== Importance in ecology ==
The source–sink model of population dynamics has made contributions to many areas in ecology. For example, a species' niche was originally described as the environmental factors required by a species to carry out its life history, and a species was expected to be found only in areas that met these niche requirements. This concept of a niche was later termed the "fundamental niche", and described as all of the places a species could successfully occupy. In contrast, the "realized niche", was described as all of the places a species actually did occupy, and was expected to be less than the extent of the fundamental niche as a result of competition with other species. However, the source–sink model demonstrated that the majority of a population could occupy a sink which, by definition, did not meet the niche requirements of the species, and was therefore outside the fundamental niche (see Figure 2). In this case, the realized niche was actually larger than the fundamental niche, and ideas about how to define a species' niche had to change.

Source–sink dynamics has also been incorporated into studies of metapopulations, a group of populations residing in patches of habitat. Though some patches may go extinct, the regional persistence of the metapopulation depends on the ability of patches to be re-colonized. As long as there are source patches present for successful reproduction, sink patches may allow the total number of individuals in the metapopulation to grow beyond what the source could support, providing a reserve of individuals available for re-colonization. Source–sink dynamics also has implications for studies of the coexistence of species within habitat patches. Because a patch that is a source for one species may be a sink for another, coexistence may actually depend on immigration from a second patch rather than the interactions between the two species. Similarly, source–sink dynamics may influence the regional coexistence and demographics of species within a metacommunity, a group of communities connected by the dispersal of potentially interacting species. Finally, the source–sink model has greatly influenced ecological trap theory, a model in which organisms prefer sink habitat over source habitat. Besides being ecological trap sink habitat may vary in their response i major disturbance and colonization of sink habitat may allow species survival even if population in source habitat extinct due to some catastrophic event which may substantially increase metapopulational stability.

== Conservation ==
Land managers and conservationists have become increasingly interested in preserving and restoring high quality habitat, particularly where rare, threatened, or endangered species are concerned. As a result, it is important to understand how to identify or create high quality habitat, and how populations respond to habitat loss or change. Because a large proportion of a species' population could exist in sink habitat, conservation efforts may misinterpret the species' habitat requirements. Similarly, without considering the presence of a trap, conservationists might mistakenly preserve trap habitat under the assumption that an organism's preferred habitat was also good quality habitat. Simultaneously, source habitat may be ignored or even destroyed if only a small proportion of the population resides there. Degradation or destruction of the source habitat will, in turn, impact the sink or trap populations, potentially over large distances. Finally, efforts to restore degraded habitat may unintentionally create an ecological trap by giving a site the appearance of quality habitat, but which has not yet developed all of the functional elements necessary for an organism's survival and reproduction. For an already threatened species, such mistakes might result in a rapid population decline toward extinction.

In considering where to place reserves, protecting source habitat is often assumed to be the goal, although if the cause of a sink is human activity, simply designating an area as a reserve has the potential to convert current sink patches to source patches (e.g. no-take zones). Either way, determining which areas are sources or sinks for any one species may be very difficult, and an area that is a source for one species may be unimportant to others. Finally, areas that are sources or sinks currently may not be in the future as habitats are continually altered by human activity or climate change. Few areas can be expected to be universal sources, or universal sinks. While the presence of source, sink, or trap patches must be considered for short-term population survival, especially for very small populations, long-term survival may depend on the creation of networks of reserves that incorporate a variety of habitats and allow populations to interact.

== See also ==
- Conservation biology
- Ecological trap
- Ecology
- Landscape ecology
- List of ecology topics
- Metapopulation
- Perceptual trap
- Population dynamics
- Population ecology
- Population viability analysis
- Refuge (ecology)
