= Ecological trap =

Phenomenon in which species sometimes prefer low-quality habitat

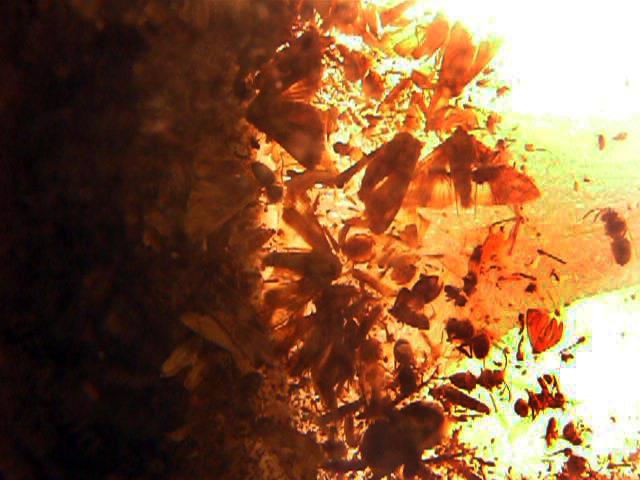
Dead insects trapped after being attracted by light in a lighting box hidden in the soil near a public monument

Ecological traps are scenarios in which rapid environmental change leads organisms to prefer to settle in poor-quality habitats. The concept stems from the idea that organisms that are actively selecting habitat must rely on environmental cues to help them identify high-quality habitat. If either the habitat quality or the cue changes so that one does not reliably indicate the other, organisms may be lured into poor-quality habitat.

== Overview ==
Ecological traps are thought to occur when the attractiveness of a habitat increases disproportionately in relation to its value for survival and reproduction. The result is preference of falsely attractive habitat and a general avoidance of high-quality but less-attractive habitats. For example, indigo buntings typically nest in shrubby habitat or broken forest transitions between closed canopy forest and open field. Human activity can create 'sharper', more abrupt forest edges and buntings prefer to nest along these edges. However, these artificial sharp forest edges also concentrate the movement of predators which predate their nests. In this way, buntings prefer to nest in highly altered habitats where their nest success is lowest.

While the demographic consequences of this type of maladaptive habitat selection behavior have been explored in the context of the sources and sinks, ecological traps are an inherently behavioral phenomenon of individuals. Despite being a behavioural mechanism, ecological traps can have far-reaching population consequences for species with large dispersal capabilities, such as the grizzly bear (Ursus arctos). The ecological trap concept was introduced in 1972 by Dwernychuk and Boag and the many studies that followed suggested that this trap phenomenon may be widespread because of anthropogenic habitat change.

As a corollary, novel environments may represent fitness opportunities that are unrecognized by native species if high-quality habitats lack the appropriate cues to encourage settlement; these are known as perceptual traps. Theoretical and empirical studies have shown that errors made in judging habitat quality can lead to population declines or extinction. Such mismatches are not limited to habitat selection, but may occur in any behavioral context (e.g. predator avoidance, mate selection, navigation, foraging site selection, etc.). Ecological traps are thus a subset of the broader phenomena of evolutionary traps.

As ecological trap theory developed, researchers have recognized that traps may operate on a variety of spatial and temporal scales which might also hinder their detection. For example, because a bird must select habitat on several scales (a habitat patch, an individual territory within that patch, as well as a nest site within the territory), traps may operate on any one of these scales. Similarly, traps may operate on a temporal scale so that an altered environment may appear to cause a trap in one stage of an organism's life, yet have positive effects on later life stages. As a result, there has been a great deal of uncertainty as to how common traps may be, despite widespread acceptance as a theoretical possibility. However, given the accelerated rate of ecological change driven by human land-use change, global warming, exotic species invasions, and changes in ecological communities resulting from species loss, ecological traps may be an increasing and highly underappreciated threat to biodiversity.

A 2006 review of the literature on ecological traps provides guidelines for demonstrating the existence of an ecological trap. A study must show a preference for one habitat over another (or equal preference) and that individuals selecting the preferred habitat (or equally preferred habitat) have lower fitness (i.e., experience lower survival or reproductive success). Since the publication of that paper which found only a few well-documented examples of ecological traps, interest in ecological and evolutionary traps has grown very rapidly and new empirical examples are being published at an accelerating rate. There are now roughly 30 examples of ecological traps affecting a broad diversity of taxa including birds, mammals, arthropods, fish and reptiles.

Because ecological and evolutionary traps are still very poorly understood phenomena, many questions about their proximate and ultimate causes as well as their ecological consequences remain unanswered. Are traps simply an inevitable consequence of the inability of evolution to anticipate novelty or react quickly to rapid environmental change? How common are traps? Do ecological traps necessarily lead to population declines or extinctions or is it possible that they may persist indefinitely? Under what ecological and evolutionary conditions should this occur? Are organisms with certain characteristics predisposed to being "trapped"? Is rapid environmental change necessary to trigger traps? Can global warming, pollution or exotic invasive species create traps? Embracing genetic and phylogenetic approaches may provide more robust answers to the above questions as well as providing deeper insight into the proximate and ultimate basis for maladaptation in general. Because ecological and evolutionary traps are predicted to add in concert with other sources of population decline, traps are an important research priority for conservation scientists. Given the rapid current rate of global environmental change, traps may be far more common than it is realized and it will be important to examine the proximate and ultimate causes of traps if management is to prevent or eliminate traps in the future.

== Polarized light pollution ==
Polarized light pollution is perhaps the most compelling and well-documented cue triggering ecological traps. Orientation to polarized sources of light is the most important mechanism that guides at least 300 species of dragonflies, mayflies, caddisflies, tabanid flies, diving beetles, water bugs, and other aquatic insects in their search for the water bodies they require for suitable feeding/breeding habitat and oviposition sites (Schwind 1991; Horváth and Kriska 2008). Because of their strong linear polarization signature, artificial polarizing surfaces (e.g., asphalt, gravestones, cars, plastic sheeting, oil pools, windows) are commonly mistaken for bodies of water (Horváth and Zeil 1996; Kriska et al. 1998, 2006a, 2007, 2008; Horváth et al. 2007, 2008). Light reflected by these surfaces is often more highly polarized than that of light reflected by water, and artificial polarizers can be even more attractive to polarotactic aquatic insects than a water body (Horváth and Zeil 1996; Horváth et al. 1998; Kriska et al. 1998) and appear as exaggerated water surfaces acting as supernormal optical stimuli. Consequently, dragonflies, mayflies, caddisflies, and other water-seeking species actually prefer to mate, settle, swarm, and oviposit upon these surfaces than on available water bodies.

== See also ==
- Evolutionary mismatch
- Perceptual trap
- Source–sink dynamics
- Artificialization
