= Evolutionary mismatch =

Scientific concept in evolutionary biology

An evolutionary mismatch (aka "mismatch theory" or "evolutionary trap") occurs when a previously advantageous trait may suddenly become maladaptive due to change in the environment, especially when change is rapid.

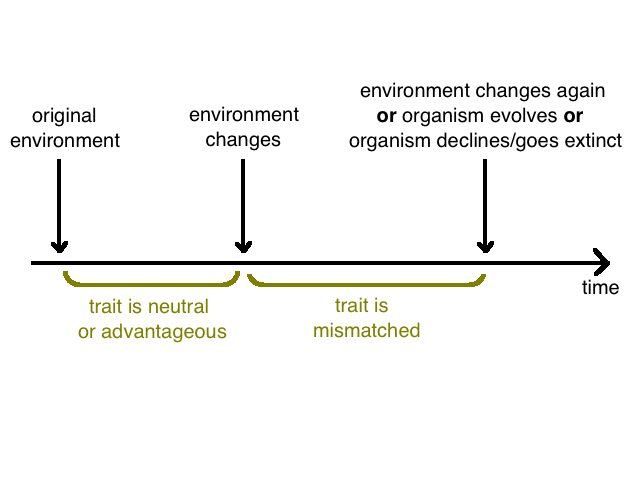
Timeline showing a period of mismatch following an environmental change

Environmental change leading to evolutionary mismatch can be broken down into two major categories: temporal (change of the existing environment over time, e.g. a climate change) or spatial (placing organisms into a new environment, e.g. a population migrating). Since environmental change occurs naturally and constantly, there will certainly be examples of evolutionary mismatch over time. However, because large-scale natural environmental change – like a natural disaster – is often rare, it is less often observed. Another more prevalent kind of environmental change is anthropogenic (human-caused). In recent times, humans have had a large, rapid, and trackable impact on the environment, thus creating scenarios where it is easier to observe evolutionary mismatch.

Because of the mechanism of evolution by natural selection, the environment ("nature") determines ("selects") which traits will persist in a population. Therefore, there will be a gradual weeding out of disadvantageous traits over several generations as the population becomes more adapted to its environment. Any significant change in a population's traits that cannot be attributed to other factors (such as genetic drift and mutation) will be responsive to a change in that population's environment; in other words, natural selection is inherently reactive. Shortly following an environmental change, traits that evolved in the previous environment, whether they were advantageous or neutral, are persistent for several generations in the new environment. Because evolution is gradual and environmental changes often occur very quickly on a geological scale, there is always a period of "catching-up" as the population evolves to become adapted to the environment. It is this temporary period of "disequilibrium" that is referred to as mismatch. Mismatched traits are ultimately addressed in one of several possible ways: the organism may evolve such that the maladaptive trait is no longer expressed, the organism may decline and/or become extinct as a result of the disadvantageous trait, or the environment may change such that the trait is no longer selected against.

== History ==
As evolutionary thought became more prevalent, scientists studied and attempted to explain the existence of disadvantageous traits, known as maladaptations, that are the basis of evolutionary mismatch.

The theory of evolutionary mismatch began under the term evolutionary trap as early as the 1940s. In his 1942 book, evolutionary biologist Ernst Mayr described evolutionary traps as the phenomenon that occurs when a genetically uniform population suited for a single set of environmental conditions is susceptible to extinction from sudden environment changes. Since then, key scientists such as Warren J. Gross and Edward O. Wilson have studied and identified numerous examples of evolutionary traps.

The first occurrence of the term "evolutionary mismatch" may have been in a paper by Jack E. Riggs published in the Journal of Clinical Epidemiology in 1993. In the years to follow, the term evolutionary mismatch has become widely used to describe biological maladaptations in a wide range of disciplines. A coalition of modern scientists and community organizers assembled to found the Evolution Institute in 2008, and in 2011 published a more recent culmination of information on evolutionary mismatch theory in an article by Elisabeth Lloyd, David Sloan Wilson, and Elliott Sober. In 2018, a popular science book appeared by evolutionary psychologists on evolutionary mismatch and its implications for humans.

== Mismatch in human evolution ==
Modern humans carry various traits that are a remnant of the Stone Age, where they were initially adapted for better chances of survival during that time. Since the development of modern societies occurred in a very short time frame under the evolutionary time scale and the Information Age only started recently, few of these traits have adopted to the living conditions of the modern world, with some of them conferring disadvantages for humans living in modern societies.

=== Neolithic Revolution: transitional context ===
The Neolithic Revolution brought about significant evolutionary changes in humans; namely the transition from a hunter-gatherer lifestyle, in which humans foraged for food, to an agricultural lifestyle. This change occurred approximately 10,000–12,000 years ago. Humans began to domesticate both plants and animals, allowing for the maintenance of constant food resources. This transition quickly and dramatically changed the way that humans interact with the environment, with societies taking up practices of farming and animal husbandry. However, human bodies had evolved to be adapted to their previous foraging lifestyle. The slow pace of evolution in comparison with the very fast pace of human advancement allowed for the persistence of these adaptations in an environment where they are no longer necessary. In some human societies that now function in a vastly different way from the hunter-gatherer lifestyle, these outdated adaptations now lead to the presence of maladaptive, or mismatched, traits.

==== Obesity and diabetes ====
Human bodies are predisposed to maintain homeostasis, especially when storing energy as fat. This trait serves as the main basis for the "thrifty gene hypothesis", the idea that "feast-or-famine conditions during human evolutionary development naturally selected for people whose bodies were efficient in their use of food calories". Hunter-gatherers, who used to live under environmental stress, benefit from this trait; there was an uncertainty of when the next meal would be, and they would spend most of their time performing high levels of physical activity. Therefore, those that consumed many calories would store the extra energy as fat, which they could draw upon in times of hunger.

However, modern humans have evolved to a world of more sedentary lifestyles and convenience foods. People are sitting more throughout their days, whether it be in their cars during rush hour or in their cubicles during their full-time jobs. Less physical activity in general means fewer calories burned throughout the day. Human diets have changed considerably over the 10,000 years since the advent of agriculture, with more processed foods in their diets that lack nutritional value and lead them to consume more sodium, sugar, and fat. These high-calorie, nutrient-deficient foods cause people to consume more calories than they burn. Fast food combined with decreased physical activity means that the "thrifty gene" that once benefited human predecessors now works against them, causing their bodies to store more fat and leading to higher levels of obesity in the population.

Obesity is one consequence of mismatched genes. Known as "metabolic syndrome", this condition is also associated with other health concerns, including insulin resistance, where the body no longer responds to insulin secretion, so blood glucose levels are unable to be lowered, which can lead to type 2 diabetes.

==== Physical activity and novelty seeking ====
For ancestral humans, constant movement and novelty seeking was beneficial, as they had to seek food, shelter, and other necessities. In the modern world, foraging/novelty seeking is less of a necessity as resources are more plentiful and readily available. Thus, novelty seeking behaviour may not confer an evolutionary advantage.

==== Osteoporosis ====
Another human disorder that can be explained by mismatch theory is the rise in osteoporosis in modern humans. In advanced societies, many people, especially women, are remarkably susceptible to osteoporosis during aging. Fossil evidence has suggested that this was not always the case, with bones from elderly hunter-gatherer women often showing no evidence of osteoporosis. Evolutionary biologists have posited that the increase in osteoporosis in modern Western populations is likely due to our considerably sedentary lifestyles. Women in hunter-gatherer societies were physically active both from a young age and well into their late-adult lives. This constant physical activity likely lead to peak bone mass being considerably higher in hunter-gatherer humans than in modern-day humans. While the pattern of bone mass degradation during aging is purportedly the same for both hunter-gatherers and modern humans, the higher peak bone mass associated with more physical activity may have enabled hunter-gatherers to resist osteoporosis during aging.

==== Hygiene hypothesis ====
The hygiene hypothesis, a concept initially theorized by immunologists and epidemiologists, has been proved to have a strong connection with evolutionary mismatch through recent studies. The hygiene hypothesis states that the profound increase in allergies, autoimmune diseases, and some other chronic inflammatory diseases is related to the reduced exposure of the immune system to antigens. Such reduced exposure is more common in industrialized countries and especially urban areas, where the inflammatory chronic diseases are also more frequently seen. Recent analysis and studies have tied the hygiene hypothesis and evolutionary mismatch together. Some researchers suggest that the overly sterilized urban environment changes or depletes the microbiota composition and diversity. Such environmental conditions favor the development of the inflammatory chronic diseases because human bodies have been selected to adapt to a pathogen-rich environment in the history of evolution. For example, studies have shown that change in our symbiont community can lead to the disorder of immune homeostasis, which can be used to explain why antibiotic use in early childhood can result in higher asthma risk. Because the change or depletion of the microbiome is often associated with hygiene hypothesis, the hypothesis is sometimes also called "biome depletion theory".

=== Human behavior ===
Behavioral examples of evolutionary mismatch theory include the abuse of dopaminergic pathways and the reward system. An action or behavior that stimulates the release of dopamine, a neurotransmitter known for generating a sense of pleasure, will likely be repeated since the brain is programmed to continually seek such pleasure. In hunter-gatherer societies, this reward system was beneficial for survival and reproductive success. But now, when there are fewer challenges to survival and reproducing, certain activities in the present environment (gambling, drug use, eating) exploit this system, leading to addictive behaviors.

==== Work stress ====
Examples of evolutionary mismatch also occur in the modern workplace. Unlike our hunter-gatherer ancestors who lived in small egalitarian societies, the modern work place is large, complex, and hierarchical. Humans spend significant amounts of time interacting with strangers in conditions that are very different from those of our ancestral past. Hunter-gatherers do not separate work from their private lives, they have no bosses to be accountable to, or no deadlines to adhere to. Our stress system reacts to immediate threats and opportunities. The modern workplace exploits evolved psychological mechanisms that are aimed at immediate survival or longer-term reproduction. These basic instincts misfire in the modern workplace, causing conflicts at work, burnout, job alienation and poor management practices.

==== Gambling ====
There are two aspects of gambling that make it an addictive activity: chance and risk. Chance gives gambling its novelty. When humans foraged and hunted for food, novelty-seeking could be advantageous, leading to discovery of new food sources for example. However, casinos exploit this tendency to draw in customers, leading to a mismatch of adaptation and environment. Rapid risk assessment was also beneficial to hunter-gatherers in the face of danger. However, the type of rapid heuristics that served early humans well are exploited by casinos to minimize feelings of loss and maximize feelings of gain. These two mismatches between human adaptation and built environment can lead to misjudgements or maladaptations like gambling addiction.

==== Drug addiction ====
Herbivores have created selective pressure for plants to possess specific molecules that deter plant consumption, such as nicotine, morphine, and cocaine. Plant-based drugs, however, have reinforcing and rewarding effects on the human neurological system, suggesting a "paradox of drug reward" in humans. Human behavioral evolutionary mismatch explains the contradiction between plant evolution and human drug use. In the last 10,000 years, humans found the dopaminergic system, or reward system, particularly useful in optimizing Darwinian fitness. While drug use has been a common characteristic of past human populations, drug use involving potent substances and diverse intake methods is a relatively contemporary feature of society. Human ancestors lived in an environment that lacked drug use of this nature, so the reward system was primarily used in maximizing survival and reproductive success. In contrast, present-day humans live in a world where the current nature of drugs render the reward system maladaptive. This class of drugs falsely triggers a fitness benefit in the reward system, leaving people susceptible to drug addiction. The modern-day dopaminergic system presents vulnerabilities to the difference in accessibility and social perception of drugs.

==== Eating ====
In the era of foraging for food, hunter-gatherers rarely knew where their next meal would come from. This food scarcity rewarded consumption of high energy meals in order to save excess energy as fat. Now that food is readily available, the neurological system that once helped people recognize the survival advantages of essential eating has now become disadvantageous as it promotes overeating. This has become especially dangerous after the rise of processed foods, as the popularity of foods that have unnaturally high levels of sugar and fat has significantly increased.

== Non-human examples ==
Evolutionary mismatches can occur any time an organism is exposed to an environment that does not resemble the typical environment the organism adapted in. Due to human influences, such as global warming and habitat destruction, the environment is changing very rapidly for many organisms, leading to numerous cases of evolutionary mismatch.

=== Examples with human influence ===
==== Sea turtles and light pollution ====
Female sea turtles create nests to lay their eggs by digging a pit on the beach, typically between the high tide line and dune, using their rear flippers. Consequently, within the first seven days of hatching, hatchling sea turtles must make the journey from the nest back into the ocean. This trip occurs predominantly at night in order to avoid predators and overheating.

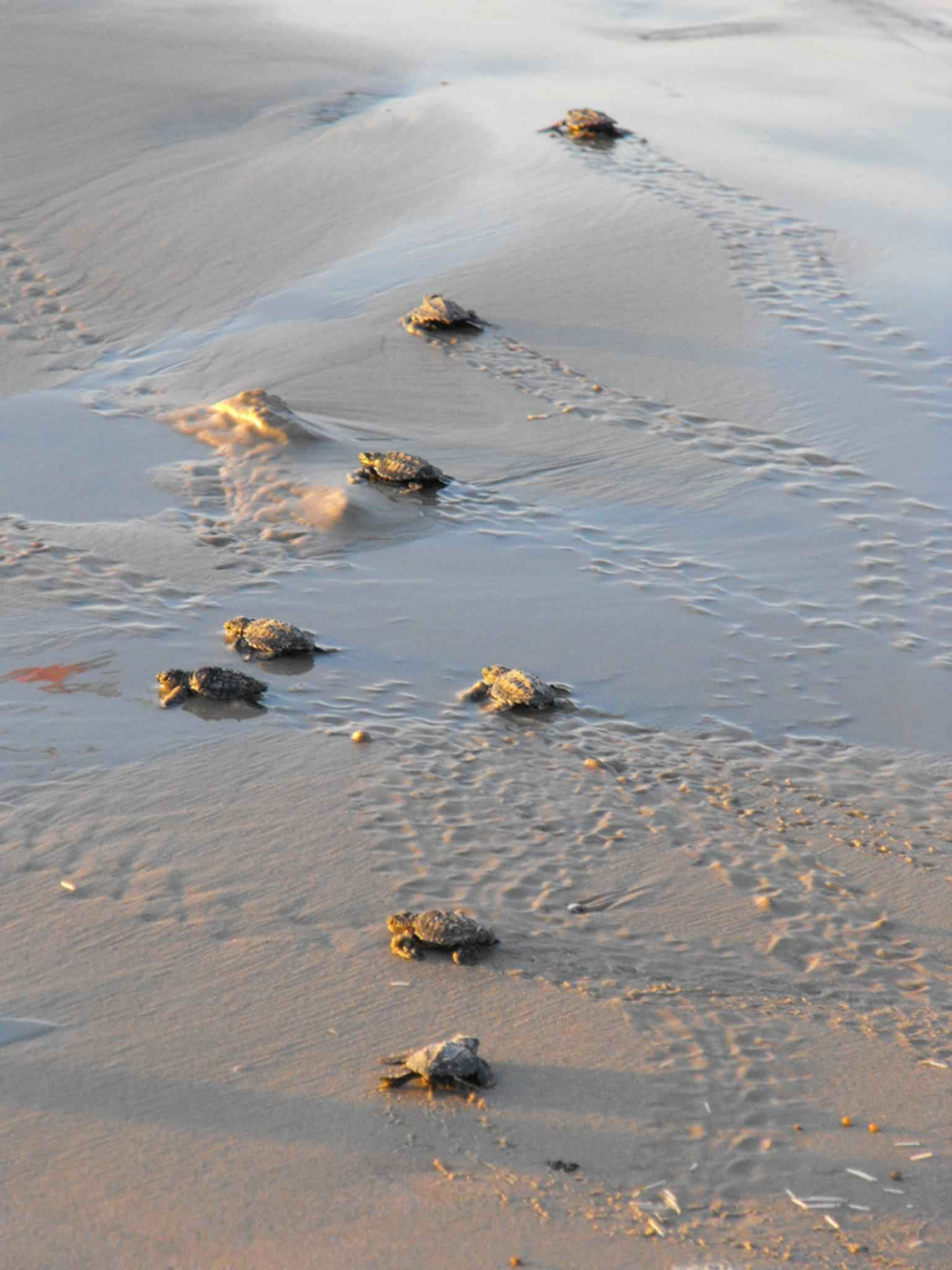
Hatchling sea turtles must make their way back into the ocean.

In order to orient themselves toward the ocean, the hatchlings depend on their eyes to turn toward the brightest direction. This is because the open horizon of the ocean, illuminated by celestial light, tends to be much brighter in a natural undeveloped beach than the dunes and vegetation. Studies propose two mechanisms of the eye for this phenomenon. Referred to as the "raster system", the theory is that sea turtles' eyes contain numerous light sensors which take in the overall brightness information of a general area and make a "measurement" of where the light is most intense. If the light sensors detect the most intense light on a hatchling's left side, the sea turtle would turn left. A similar proposal called the complex phototropotaxis system theorizes that the eyes contain light intensity comparators that take in detailed information of the intensity of light from all directions. Sea turtles "know" that they are facing the brightest direction when the light intensity is balanced between both eyes.

This method of finding the ocean is successful in natural beaches, but in developed beaches, the intense artificial lights from buildings, light houses, and even abandoned fires overwhelm the sea turtles and cause them to head toward the artificial light instead of the ocean. Scientists call this misorientation. Sea turtles can also become disoriented and circle around in the same place. Numerous cases show that misoriented hatchling sea turtles either die from dehydration, get consumed by a predator, or even burn to death in an abandoned fire. The direct impact of light pollution on the number of sea turtles has been too difficult to measure. However, this problem is exacerbated because all species of sea turtles are endangered. Other animals, including migratory birds and insects, are also victims to light pollution because they also depend on light intensity at night to properly orient themselves.

==== Dodo bird and hunting ====
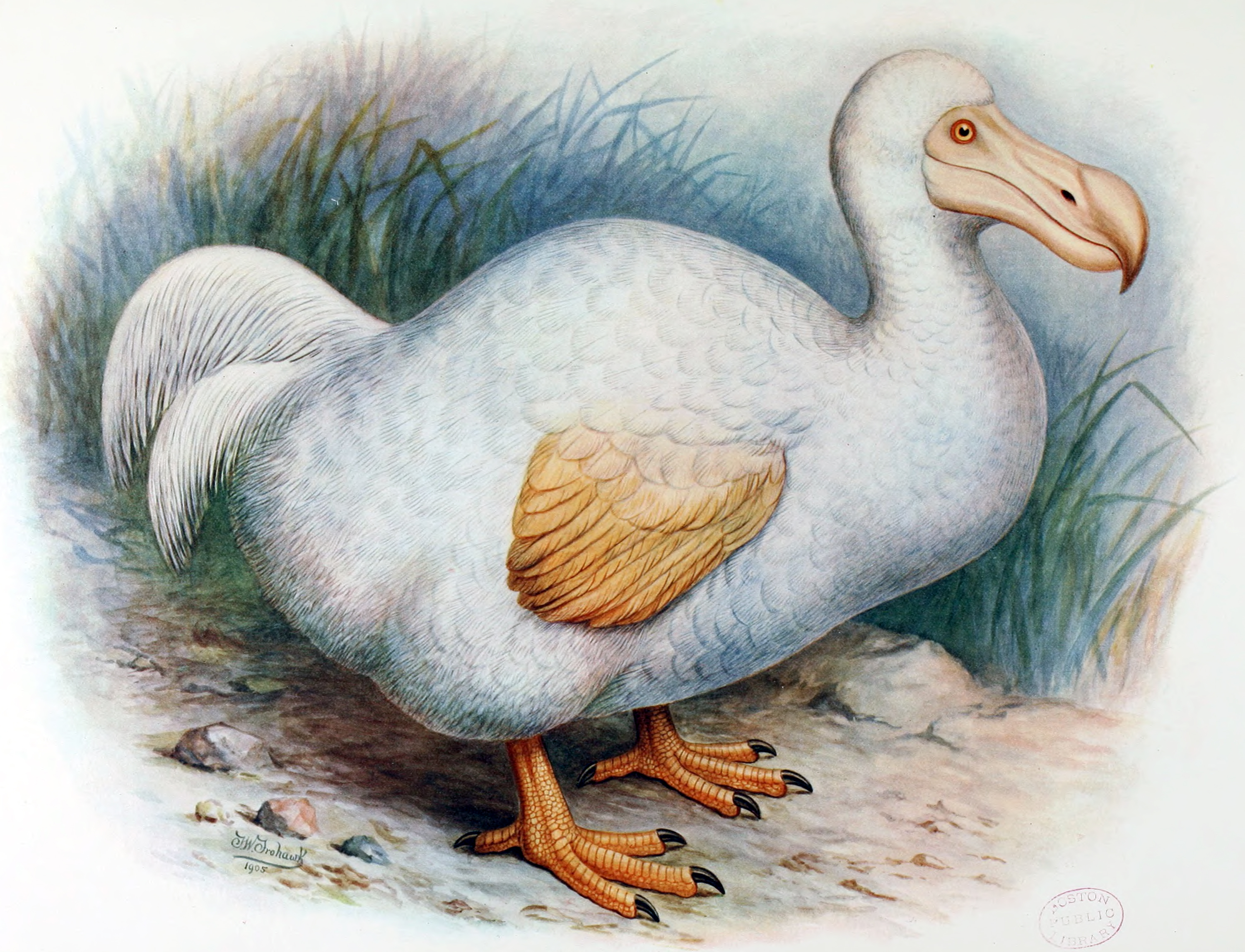
Dodo birds became extinct due to hunting.

The dodo bird lived on a remote Island, Mauritius, in the absence of predators. Here, the dodo evolved to lose its instinct for fear and the ability to fly. This allowed them to be easily hunted by Dutch sailors who arrived on the island in the late 16th century. The Dutch sailors also brought foreign animals to the island such as monkeys and pigs that ate the dodo bird's eggs, which was detrimental to the population growth of the slow breeding bird. Their fearlessness made them easy targets and their inability to fly gave them no opportunity to evade danger. Thus, they were easily driven to extinction within a century of their discovery.

The dodo's inability to fly was once beneficial for the bird because it conserved energy. The dodo conserved more energy relative to birds with the ability to fly, due to the dodo's smaller pectoral muscles. Smaller muscle sizes are linked to lower rates of maintenance metabolism, which in turn conserved energy for the dodo. Lacking an instinct for fear was another way the dodo conserved energy, because a stress response uses energy. Both mechanisms of conservation of energy were once advantageous because they enabled the dodo to minimize energy expenditure. However, these proved disadvantageous when their island was invaded, rendering them defenseless to the new dangers that humans brought.

==== Peppered moths during the English Industrial Revolution ====
Before the English Industrial Revolution of the late 18th and early 19th centuries, the most common phenotypic color of the peppered moth was white with black speckles. When higher air pollution in urban regions killed the lichens adhering to trees and exposed their darker bark, the light-colored moths were easier for predators to see. Natural selection began favoring a previously rare darker variety of the peppered moth referred to as "carbonaria" because the lighter phenotype had become mismatched to its environment.

Carbonaria frequencies rose above 90% in some areas of England until efforts in the late 1900s to reduce air pollution caused a resurgence of epiphytes, including lichens, to again lighten the color of trees. Under these conditions the coloring of the carbonaria reverted from an advantage to a disadvantage and that phenotype became mismatched to its environment.

==== Giant jewel beetle and beer bottles ====
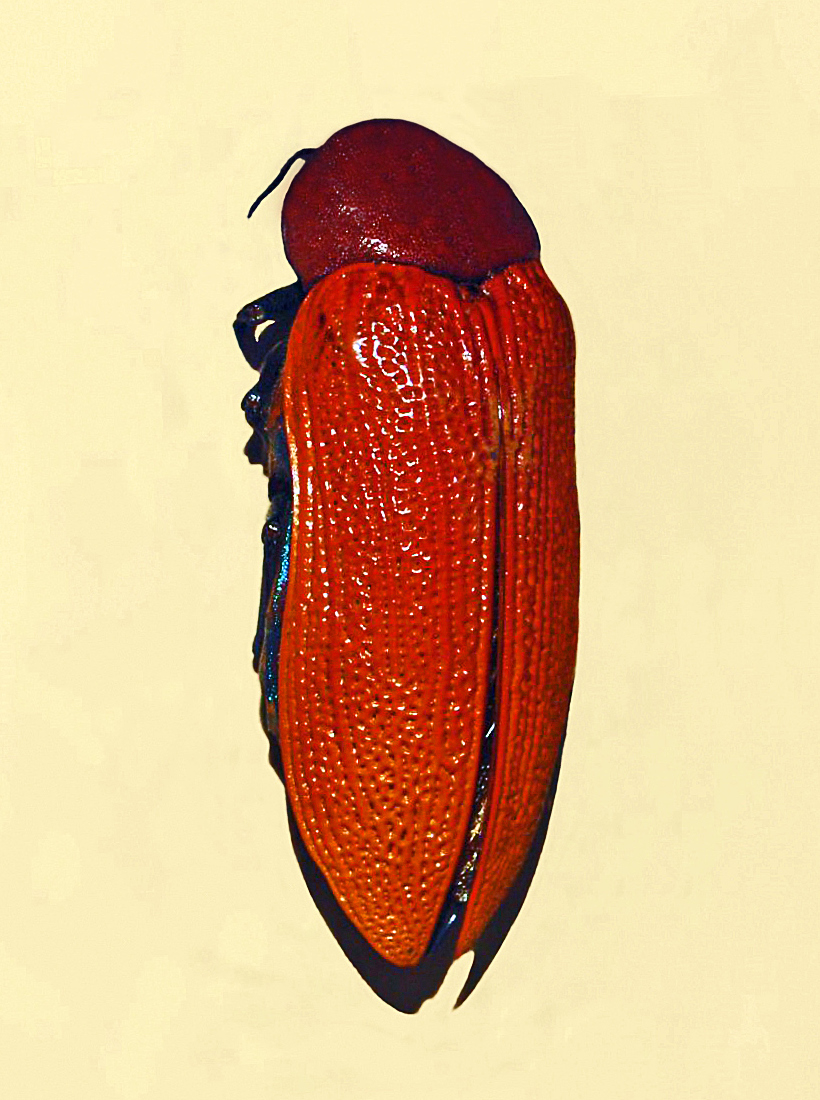
Male jewel beetles often mistake littered beer bottles for attractive large females and may even prefer beer bottles over beetles in mating.

Evolutionary mismatch can also be seen among insects. One example is the giant jewel beetle (Julodimorpha bakewelli). The male jewel beetle has evolved to be attracted to identifiable features of the female jewel beetle as it flies across the desert. These features include size, color, and texture. However, similar physical traits are seen in some beer bottles. As a result, males often mistake beer bottles for females, and may even find bottles more attractive than female jewel beetles due to the beer bottle's large size and attractive coloring. Beer bottles are often discarded by humans in the Australian desert that the jewel beetle lives in, causing male jewel beetles to waste energy attempting to mate with beer bottles instead of females. This reduces the reproductive output of the jewel beetle, as fewer beetles successfully mate. The result is an evolutionary mismatch, as a habit that evolved to aid in reproduction has become disadvantageous due to the anthropogenic littering of beer bottles.

=== Examples without human influence ===
==== Information cascades between birds ====
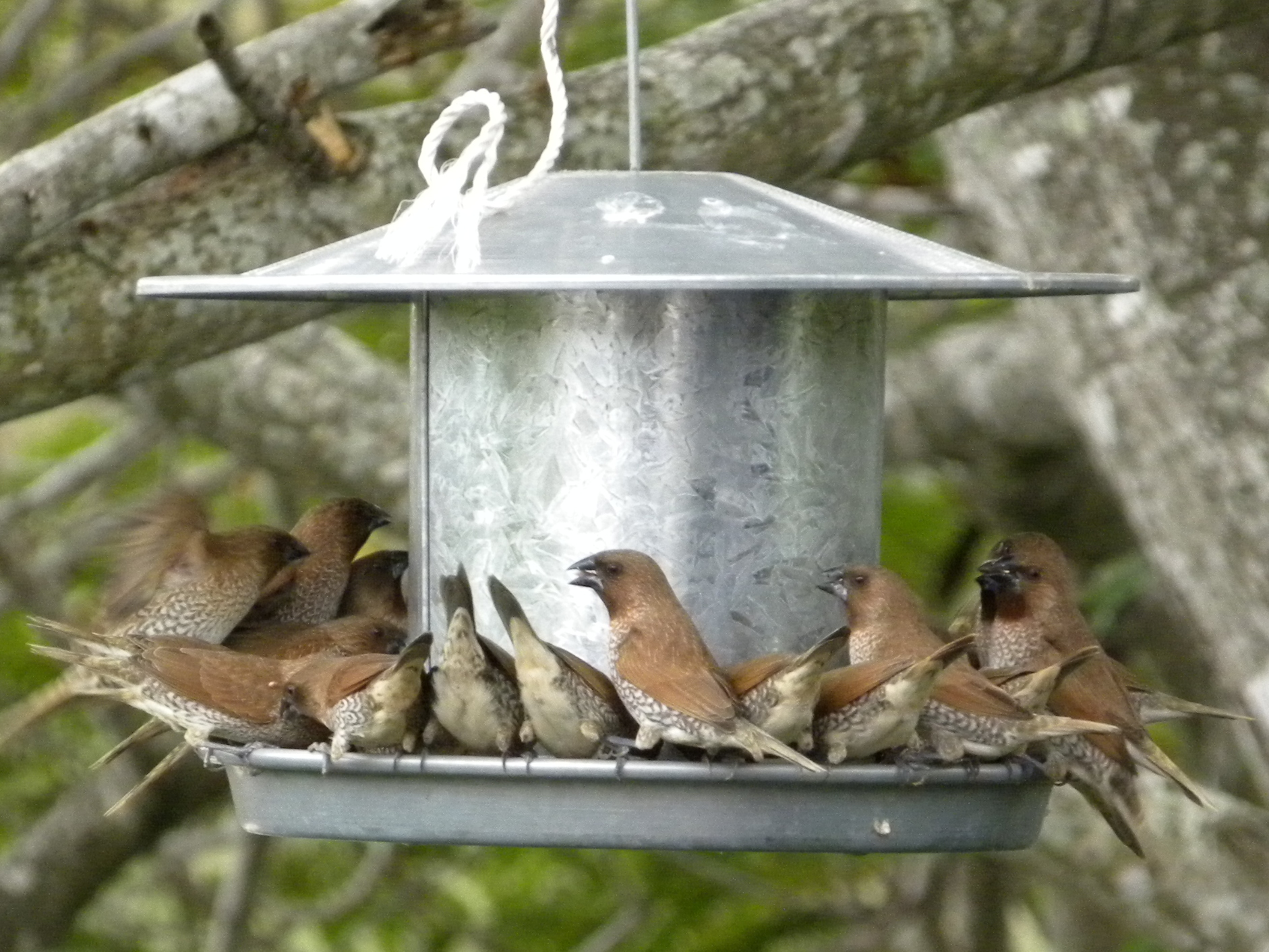
A group of nutmeg mannikins at a bird feeder

Normally, gaining information from watching other organisms allows the observer to make good decisions without spending effort. More specifically, birds often observe the behavior of other organisms to gain valuable information, such as the presence of predators, good breeding sites, and optimal feeding spots. Although this allows the observer to spend less effort gathering information, it can also lead to bad decisions if the information gained from observing is unreliable. In the case of the nutmeg mannikins, the observer can minimize the time spent looking for an optimal feeder and maximize its feeding time by watching where other nutmeg mannikins feed. However, this relies on the assumption that the observed mannikins also had reliable information that indicated the feeding spot was an ideal one. This behavior can become maladaptive when prioritizing information gained from watching others leads to information cascades, where birds follow the rest of the crowd even though prior experience may have suggested that the decision of the crowd is a poor one. For instance, if a nutmeg mannikin sees enough mannikins feeding at a feeder, nutmeg mannikins have been shown to choose that feeder even if their personal experience indicates that the feeder is a poor one.

==== House finches and the introduction of the MG disease ====
Evolutionary mismatch occurs in house finches when they are exposed to infectious individuals. Male house finches tend to feed in close proximity to other finches that are sick or diseased, because sick individuals are less competitive than usual, in turn making the healthy male more likely to win an aggressive interaction if it happens. To make it less likely to lose a social confrontation, healthy finches are inclined to forage near individuals that are lethargic or listless due to disease. However, this disposition has created an evolutionary trap for the finches after the introduction of the MG disease in 1994. Since this disease is infectious, healthy finches will be in danger of contraction if they are in the vicinity of individuals that have previously developed the disease. The relatively short duration of the disease's introduction has caused an inability for the finches to adapt quickly enough to avoid nearing sick individuals, which ultimately results in the mismatch between their behavior and the changing environment.

==== Exploitation of earthworm's reaction to vibrations ====
Worm charming is a practice used by people to attract earthworms out of the ground by driving in a wooden stake to vibrate the soil. This activity is commonly performed to collect fishing bait and as a competitive sport. Worms that sense the vibrations rise to the surface. Research shows that humans are actually taking advantage of a trait that worms adapted to avoid hungry burrowing moles which prey on the worms. This type of evolutionary trap, where an originally beneficial trait is exploited in order to catch prey, was coined the "rare enemy effect" by Richard Dawkins, an English evolutionary biologist. This trait of worms has been exploited not only by humans, but by other animals. Herring gulls and wood turtles have been observed to also stamp on the ground to drive the worms up to the surface and consume them.

== See also ==
- Evolution
- Evolutionary anachronism
- Evolutionary biology
- Evolutionary trap
- Fisher's geometric model
- Human impact on the environment
- Natural environment
- Person–environment fit
- Rate of evolution
