= Perceptual trap =

Conceptual representation (2x2 table) of sources and sinks, ecological traps, and perceptual traps. Adapted from Patten and Kelly (2010)

A perceptual trap is an ecological scenario in which environmental change, typically anthropogenic, leads an organism to avoid an otherwise high-quality habitat. The concept is related to that of an ecological trap, in which environmental change causes preference toward a low-quality habitat.

== History ==
In a 2004 article discussing source–sink dynamics, James Battin did not distinguish between high-quality habitats that are preferred or avoided, labelling both "sources". The latter scenario, in which a high-quality habitat is avoided, was first recognised as an important phenomenon in 2007 by Gilroy and Sutherland, who described them as "undervalued resources". The term "perceptual trap" was first proposed by Michael Patten and Jeffrey Kelly in a 2010 article. Hans Van Dyck argues that the term is misleading because perception is also a major component in other cases of trapping.

== Description ==
Animals use discrete environmental cues to select habitat. A perceptual trap occurs if change in an environmental cue leads an organism to avoid a high-quality habitat. It differs, therefore, from simple habitat avoidance, which may be a correct decision given the habitat's quality. The concept of a perceptual trap is related to that of an ecological trap, in which environmental change causes preference towards a low-quality habitat. There is expected to be strong natural selection against ecological traps, but not necessarily against perceptual traps, as Allee effects may restrict a population’s ability to establish itself.

== Examples ==
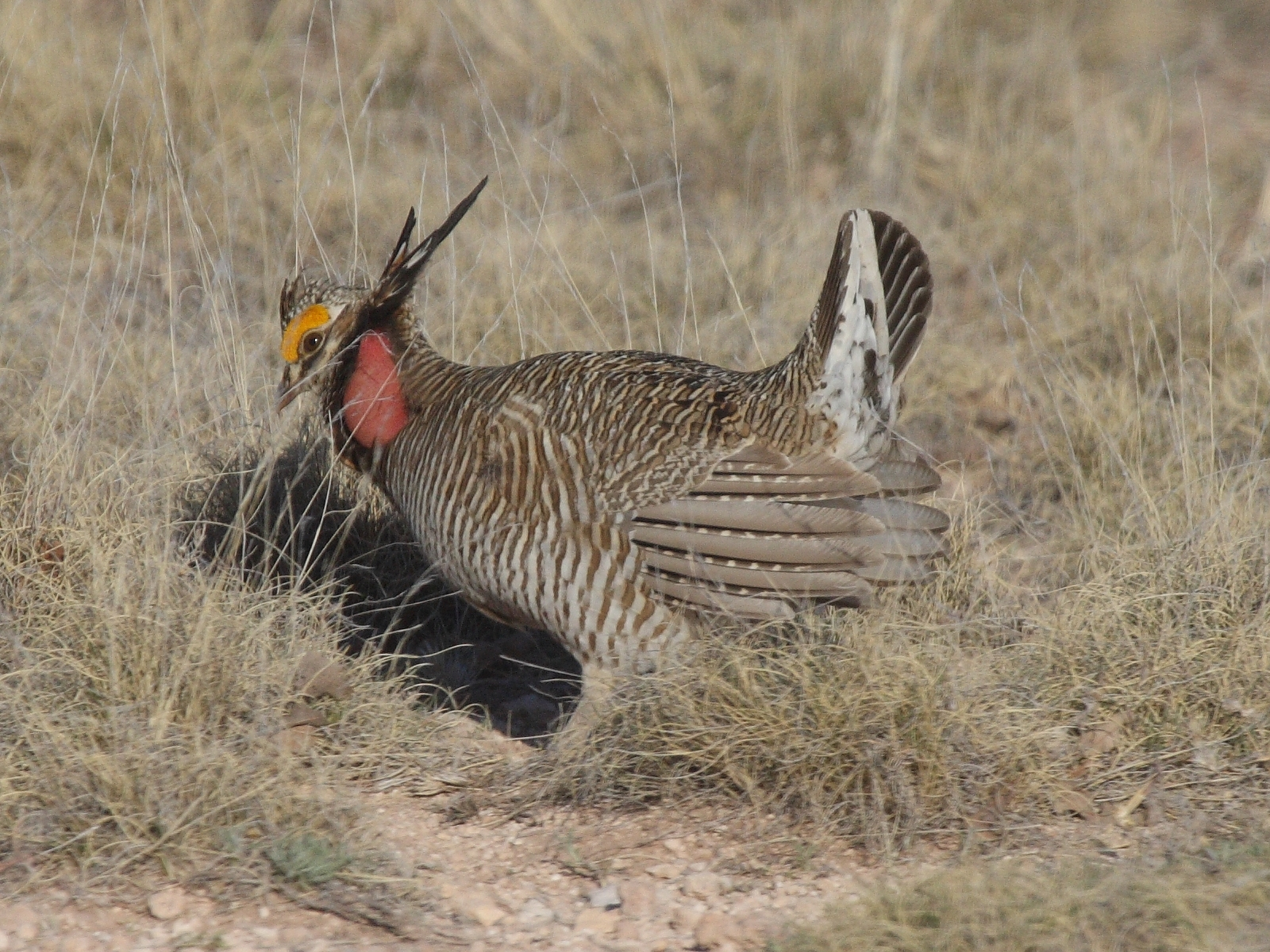
Patten and Kelly propose that a perceptual trap is acting on populations of the lesser prairie-chicken

To support the concept of a perceptual trap, Patten and Kelly cited a study of the lesser prairie-chicken (Tympanuchus pallidicinctus). The species' natural environment, shinnery oak grassland, is often treated with the herbicide tebuthiuron to increase grass cover for cattle grazing. Herbicide treatment resulted in less shrub cover, a habitat cue that caused female lesser prairie-chickens to avoid the habitat in favour of untreated areas. However, females who nested in herbicide-treated areas achieved comparable nesting successes and clutch sizes to those in untreated areas. Patten and Kelly suggest that the adverse effects of tebuthiuron treatment on nesting success are countered by various effects, such as greater nest concealment through increased grass cover. Therefore, female birds are erroneously avoiding a high-quality habitat. Patten and Kelly also cited as a possible perceptual trap the cases of the spotted towhee (Pipilo maculatus) and rufous-crowned sparrow (Aimophila ruficeps), which tend to avoid habitat fragments, even though birds nesting in habitat fragments achieve increased nesting success due to a reduction in snake predation.

== See also ==
- Ecological trap
- Source–sink dynamics
- Type I and type II errors
