= Natural risk =

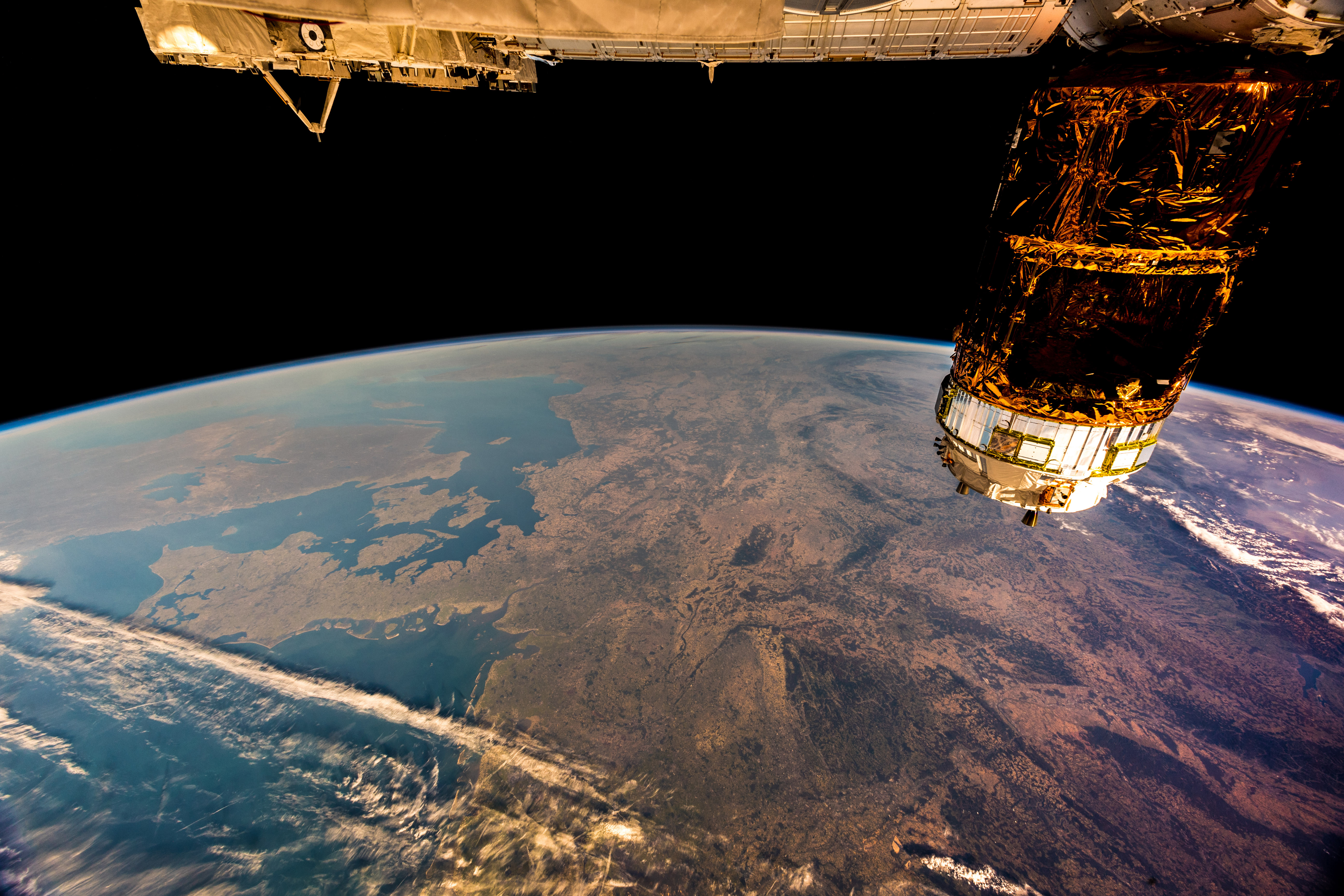
Deforestation in Europe, 2018. Almost all of Europe's original forests have been removed

Natural risks or nature risks are risks recognized in risk management that are related to the loss of natural assets. They may impact businesses or economies by impacting directly on operations or by negatively affecting society in a way that then creates market risks. The loss of nature can also contribute to systemic geopolitical risk because nature's assets and services, such as clean air, plentiful fresh water, fertile soils, a stable climate, provide vital public goods on which human societies rely for their functioning. An example is tropical deforestation. It is a key source of nature risk for sectors that either have an impact or dependency on tropical forests.

== Examples of impacts ==
- Nature risks can increase policy and regulatory intervention. As a result, in response to these risks, some sectors of the economy might have to face big shifts in asset values or higher costs of doing business for companies that generate negative impacts on nature. For example, in 2018 Indonesia's president issued a three-year moratorium on clearing primary forests and peatlands for land-use activities such as palm oil plantations and logging, and this was made permanent in 2019. The moratorium is forecast to reduce Indonesia's economic growth and negatively affect other macroeconomic indicators such as gross national expenditure (GNE) and welfare. Sumatra, Indonesia's largest palm oil-producing region, is expected to be worst affected, with a predicted -2% deviation from its baseline GDP by 2030.
- As consumers and the market react to nature risks, leading to supply and demand patterns shifted, novel products/services, technologies and business models emerge and may disrupt the established business community. For example, meat and fish alternatives, including synthetic proteins, will increasingly replace traditional meat products. The demand for cow products will decrease by 70% by 2030, and by 80–90% by 2035, with a total cost in excess of $100 billion to meat producers and their supply chains.
- Customers, clients, and the wider public will hold many companies accountable for any natural capital decline or biodiversity loss and sue them for such losses. These shifts in public sentiment can result in lower brand value, loss of customer base and profits or further increases in insurance premiums (in the case of legal action). This trend of social awareness on nature-related issues is on the rise. For instance, in 2010, Greenpeace launched a campaign against Nestlé's KitKat brand to raise awareness about the brand's sourcing of palm oil from deforested Indonesian rainforests. Nestlé's stock subsequently decreased by 4%.

== See also ==
- Crisis management
- Natural hazard and Natural disaster
- Key risk indicators
- Risk management tools
- Financial risk modeling
- Country risk
- Model risk
- Political risk
- Valuation risk
- Moral hazard
- Reputational risk
